= Insigniteuthis =

Scientific classification
- Kingdom: Animalia
- Phylum: Mollusca
- Class: Cephalopoda
- Order: Octopoda
- Family: Opisthoteuthidae
- Genus: Insigniteuthis; Verhoeff, 2024

Type species
- Insigniteuthis obscura Verhoeff, 2024

Genus of molluscs

Insigniteuthis is a genus of cirrate octopuses, found in the deep-sea around the world's oceans. The genus was created in 2024 to accommodate species formerly in the genus Opisthoteuthis which have a distinctly different configuration of enlarged suckers. In Insigniteuthis, mature males haves a cluster of 2 or 3 massively enlarged suckers near the arm tips, with these suckers much larger than a second field of enlarged suckers found closer to the mouth.

== Species ==
The type species of the genus is Insigniteuthis obscura, in addition several additional species have been placed in Insigniteuthis (transferred from Opisthoteuthis), the species Insigniteuthis extensa was allocated to the genus later following a re-description, and some others such as I. medusoides still need re-description to confirm their taxonomy:

- Insigniteuthis calypso Villanueva, Collins, Sánchez & Voss, 2002
- Insigniteuthis dongshaensis C. C. Lu, 2010
- Insigniteuthis extensa Thiele, 1915
- Insigniteuthis medusoides (Thiele, 1915)
- Insigniteuthis obscura Verhoeff, 2024
