= Opisthoteuthis borealis =

Conservation status
- Data Deficient (IUCN 3.1)

Scientific classification
- Kingdom: Animalia
- Phylum: Mollusca
- Class: Cephalopoda
- Order: Octopoda
- Family: Opisthoteuthidae
- Genus: Opisthoteuthis
- Species: O. borealis

Binomial name
- Opisthoteuthis borealis Collins, 2005

Species of octopus

Opisthoteuthis borealis is a lesser-known species of octopus found near Greenland and Iceland, especially in the Davis Strait. The species was described from 9 specimens, and is one of the most recent Opisthoteuthis species described. Not much is known about it besides its anatomy and habitat.

== Description ==
Opisthoteuthis borealis belongs to the order Cirrata, a subdivision of octopuses which have fleshy fins to assist in swimming, internal shells supporting their bodies, and two threadlike structures called cirri for each sucker. Many cirrate octopuses live in deep water.

Octopuses in the species Opisthoteuthis borealis have mantles up to 75 mm (3.0 in) long. They are medium-sized when compared to closely related species. They have long arms and large eyes.

Males of O. borealis have some enlarged suckers; their purpose is unknown. Females don't have enlarged suckers. This specific kind of sex difference, or sexual dimorphism, is also seen in Opisthoteuthis albatrossi and Opisthoteuthis californiana. Some of the males' arms are thickened compared to the arms of females.

Anatomically, this species is most similar to Opisthoteuthis grimaldii.

== Etymology ==
The genus name comes from Ancient Greek ὄπισθεν (ópisthen), meaning "back", and τευθίς (teuthís), meaning "squid". The specific name borealis means "northern" in Latin.

== Habitat ==
Of all species of Opisthoteuthis found in the Atlantic Ocean, O. borealis lives the furthest north. They are found near Greenland and Iceland at depths of 957–1,321 m (3,140–4,334 ft) deep. They live in waters with a small temperature range of 3.0–3.5 °C (37.4–38.3 °F). These octopuses occupy the benthic zone, on and just above the seafloor. The species is of little or no interest to fisheries.
