= Exsuperoteuthis =

Scientific classification
- Kingdom: Animalia
- Phylum: Mollusca
- Class: Cephalopoda
- Order: Octopoda
- Family: Opisthoteuthidae
- Genus: Exsuperoteuthis; Verhoeff, 2024

Type species
- Exsuperoteuthis persephone (Berry, 1918)

Genus of cirrate octopuses

Exsuperoteuthis is a genus of cirrate octopuses, comprising two or three species found in the northern and southwestern Pacific. The genus was recently created to accommodate species formerly in the genus Opisthoteuthis which have a distinctly different configuration of enlarged suckers.

In Exsuperoteuthis, mature males massively enlarged suckers spanning nearly the full arm length (excluding the tip) on all arms, differing from other Opisthoteuthidae genera which have either two fields of enlarged suckers on arms (proximal and distal) or only a proximal field (enlarged suckers only near the mouth).

== Species ==
Two species are recognized in this genus, a third species O. japonica Taki, 1962 is likely a synonym of E. depressa:

- Exsuperoteuthis depressa (Ijima & Ikeda, 1895) — found in the northwestern Pacific off Japan.
- Exsuperoteuthis persephone (Berry, 1918) — found around southern and south-eastern Australia.
