= Insigniteuthis obscura =

Scientific classification
- Kingdom: Animalia
- Phylum: Mollusca
- Class: Cephalopoda
- Order: Octopoda
- Family: Opisthoteuthidae
- Genus: Insigniteuthis
- Species: I. obscura

Binomial name
- Insigniteuthis obscura Verhoeff, 2024

Species of mollusc

Insigniteuthis obscura is a species of finned cirrate octopus (or flapjack octopus) found along southern and southeastern Australia, over a depth range of 940-1210 m.

The species is distinct for males having 2 or 3 massively enlarged suckers on the 2^{nd} - 4^{th} arm pairs (i.e., not present on the dorsal arm pair, but present on all other arms). These greatly enlarged distal suckers are several times the diameter of suckers along the mid region of the arms, and exceed the size of a proximal field of enlarged suckers nearer the mouth.

The species has a dark purple-brown coloration, and has a single large whitish spot near the base of each arm.

The species name 'obscura' was in reference to uncertainty regarding the identification of the species prior to its description, with specimens previously being assumed to be Opisthoteuthis pluto, which also occurs along southern Australia.

The species is similar to Insigniteuthis dongshaensis and Insigniteuthis extensa in having 2 or 3 massively enlarged distal suckers on at least some arms of mature males, though in these species, the greatly enlarged distal suckers are restricted to the 3^{rd} and 4^{th} arm pairs only.
