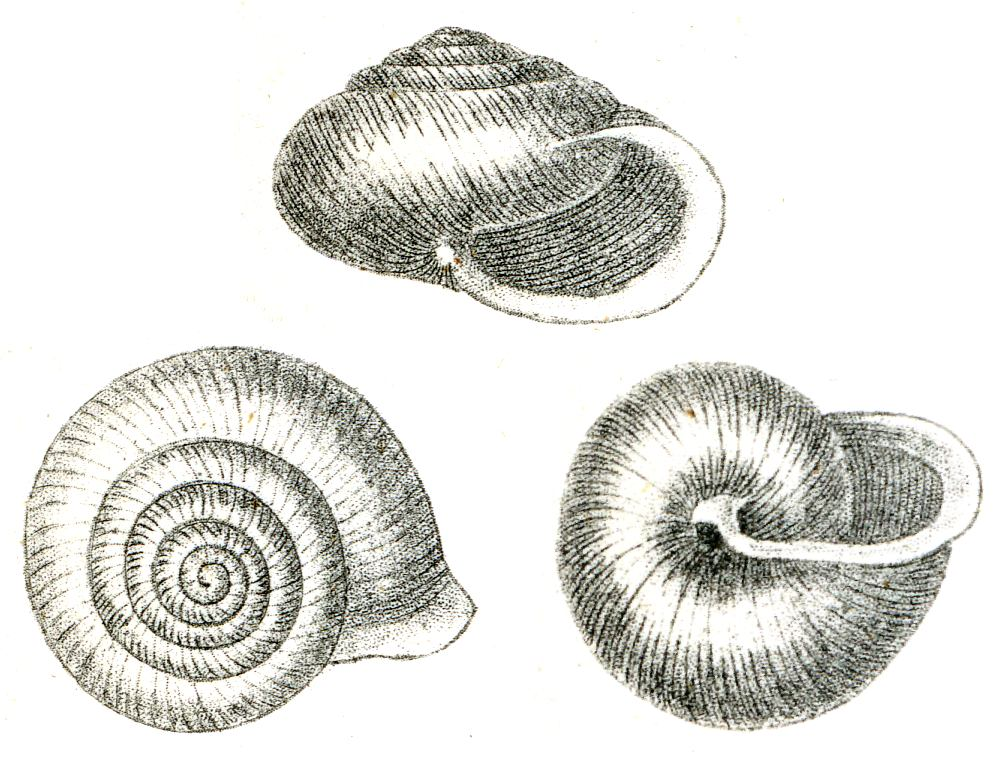
- Drawing: three views of a shell of Vespericola columbiana from W. G. Binney, 1878
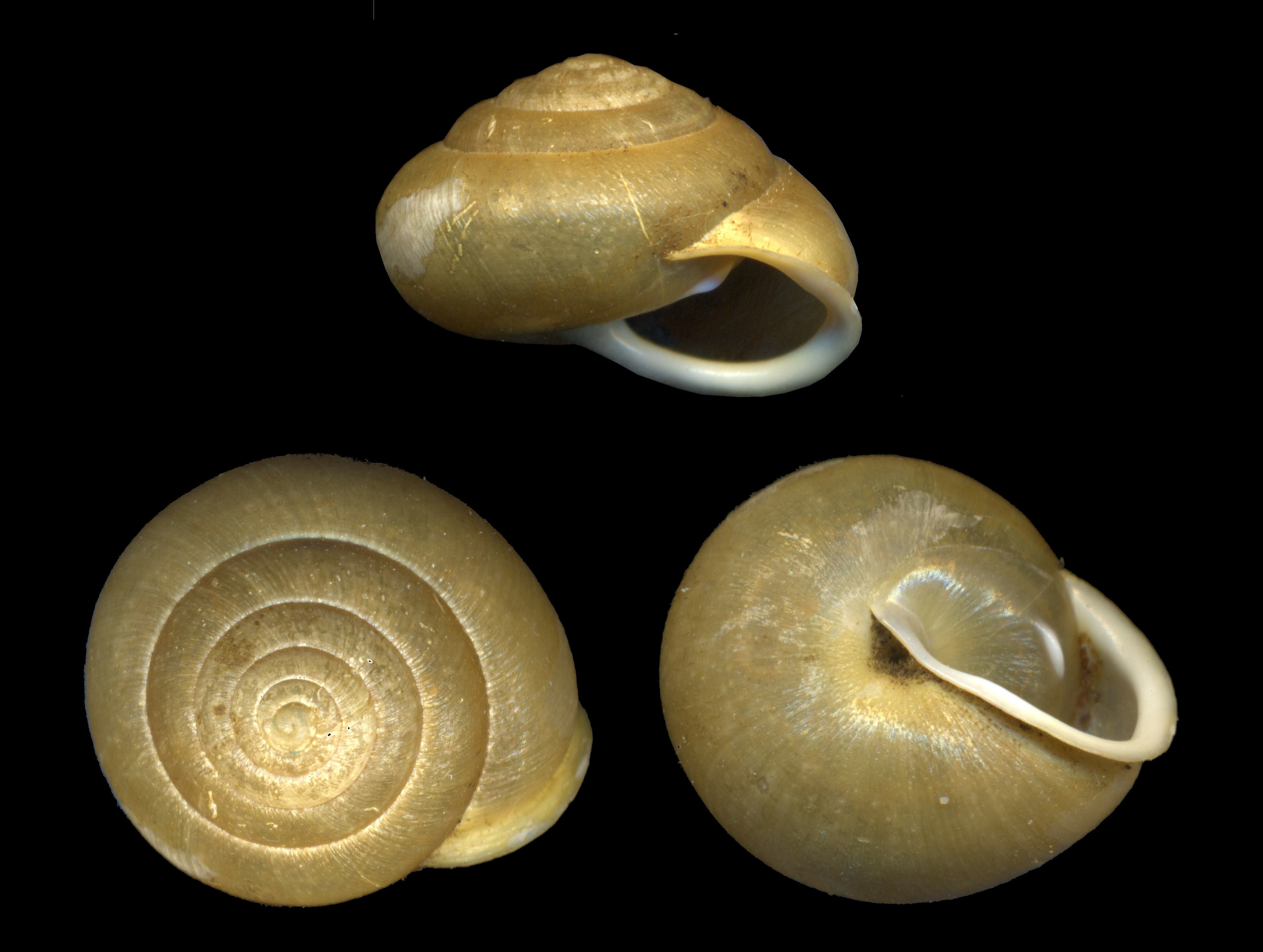
- Photograph: three views of a shell of Vespericola armigera

Scientific classification
- Domain: Eukaryota
- Kingdom: Animalia
- Phylum: Mollusca
- Class: Gastropoda
- Order: Stylommatophora
- Family: Polygyridae
- Subfamily: Triodopsinae
- Tribe: Vespericolini; Kenneth C. Emberton, 1995

= Vespericolini =

Tribe of gastropods

Vespericolini, or hesperians, are a tribe of air-breathing land snails, terrestrial pulmonate gastropod molluscs in the family Polygyridae.

It contains two genera: Vespericola and Hochbergellus.

== Habitat ==
These snails are found along the Pacific Coast of North America, with Vespericola found from southern Alaska and British Columbia to California, and Hochbergellus found only in coastal Oregon.

== Anatomy ==
The shells of these small to medium, globose or depressed globose snails are usually some shade of brown, sometimes without apertural teeth and sometimes with a single tooth on the parietal wall. Small periostracal hairs may be observed on the shell surface of many specimens, but the shells otherwise resemble those of Praticolella or Mesodon.

The two genera, Vespericola and Hochbergellus, cannot be distinguished based on shell anatomy. They can only be distinguished by examining internal organs, such as the reproductive system.
