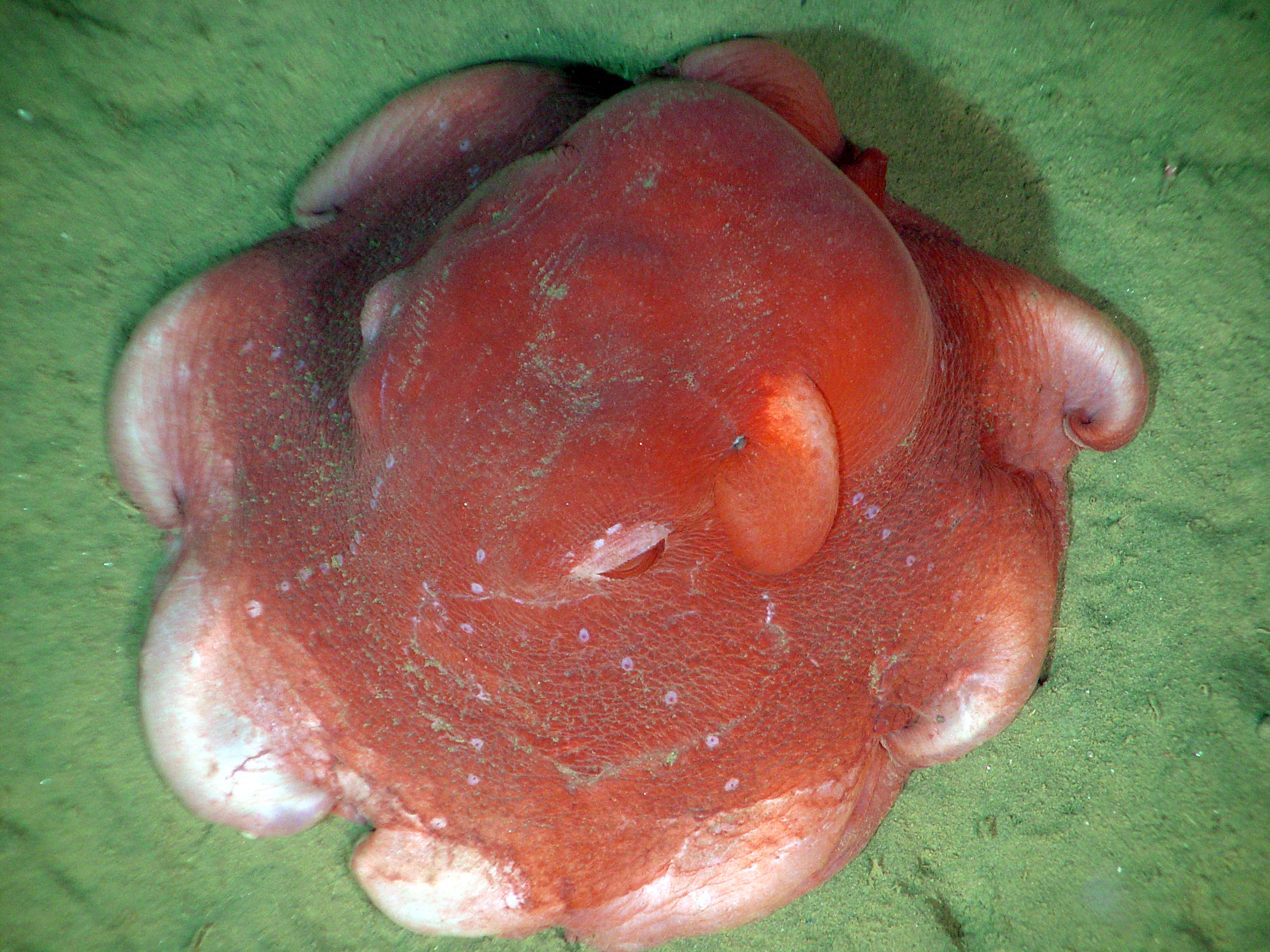

Conservation status
- Data Deficient (IUCN 3.1)

Scientific classification
- Kingdom: Animalia
- Phylum: Mollusca
- Class: Cephalopoda
- Order: Octopoda
- Family: Opisthoteuthidae
- Genus: Opisthoteuthis
- Species: O. californiana

Binomial name
- Opisthoteuthis californiana Berry, 1949

= Opisthoteuthis californiana =

Flapjack octopus

Species of cephalopod known as the flapjack octopus

Opisthoteuthis californiana, also known as the flapjack octopus or flapjack devilfish, is a species of umbrella octopus.

== Description ==
O. californiana is one of 14 species in the genus Opisthoteuthis, these species are also collectively known as the flapjack devilfishes (due to the anterior-posterior compression of their bodies, which makes them flatter when laying on the seafloor). O. californiana is morphologically very similar to Opisthoteuthis albatrossi, and they may be the same species, but the two have never been critically compared (due to the latter being historically placed in the genus Stauroteuthis). If they are conspecific, O. californiana would be a synonym of O. albatrossi (as the latter was described first in 1920, the former in 1949).

Flapjack octopuses usually appear pinkish, possessing a gelatinous body. They have fins above their eyes, similar to those found on some species of squid. Their maximum size is 20 cm (7.9 in) mantle length. They have eight arms (like any other octopus), but these are joined together by a membrane or "webbing", forming an umbrella-like shape; these webbed arms are spread into a parachute-like shape when maneuvering through dimly lit water. Unlike commonly known octopus which live in shallower waters, they are unable to camouflage by changing skin color and texture. They swim by moving their fins, pulsing their webbed arms, pushing water through their funnel for jet propulsion, or all three at once.

What was thought to be an undescribed Opisthoteuthis species from off California, overlapping the distribution of O. californiana, was dubbed 'Opisthoteuthis adorabilis' in the media. This name is a nomen nudum (invalid name), due to a lack of a published description. The late F.G. Eric Hochberg was also planning on describing this species. Recent work using molecular data, ROV observations, and Hochberg's unpublished descriptions indicate that this second Californian species, is actually the northern range extension of Opisthoteuthis bruuni (previously known from off Peru and Chile).

== Distribution ==
O. californiana is distributed in the northern and northeastern Pacific Ocean, ranging in the west from off central Honshū (Japan) and the Sea of Okhotsk, its northernmost range being the Bering Sea, and its eastern range is along the western coast of North America as far south as Eureka Bar, California (the type locality, at 350 metres (1,150 ft) depth). The depth at which the species occurs typically ranges from 124 to 823 metres (407 to 2,700 ft), but more recent records indicate that they may occur down to 1,500 metres (4,900 ft). This species lives on the "muddy" seafloor (pelagic sediment ).

== Biology ==
External videos
- Shy Octopus Hides Inside Its Own Tentacles Nautilus Live

The stomach contents of eight members of O. californiana were found to contain small benthic/epibenthic crustaceans, including copepods, isopods, mysids, and small shrimp (crangonid or hippolytid). From observations of other Opisthoteuthis species, the extensive arm webbing is possibly used to trap small crustaceans, with the cirri and suckers moving small prey items towards the mouth (a fairly low-energy feeding strategy compared to shallow-water octopus).

=== Reproduction ===
Opisthoteuthis species (like other cirrate octopuses) use continuous spawning, where the female lays one or two large eggs at a time over several years (rather than a large batch near the end of her lifespan). These eggs have a hard, protective outer shell (unlike the eggs of incirrate octopus) and are not brooded or protected by the mother, while the hatched young undergo direct development (lacking the paralarvae stage of incirrate octopus) and are likely benthic.

Mature O. californiana females carry about 1400–2380 eggs in their ovary, with the individually spawned mature eggs measuring 11 millimetres (0.43 in) long. Estimations of egg hatching time (using water temperature and egg size) for O. californiana are up to 1.4 years at 4 degrees Celsius (39 °F).

Mating has never been observed in O. californiana; the males lack the hectocotylus of typical octopus, instead having a series of enlarged suckers that presumably have a role in mating or competition. Males move seasonally, and occur in shallower waters during the summer.

== Relation to humans ==
Members of O. californiana from the Monterey Canyon were researched ex situ in 2015 by scientists from the Monterey Bay Aquarium Research Institute, with several Opisthoteuthis sp. specimens (including a fertile female) that resemble O. californiana (in media these were given the informal name Opisthoteuthis 'adorabilis'). Due to the challenges of mimicking their deep sea environment in captivity, some of the octopuses lived only for a few months, but some of the laid eggs incubated for a year in the laboratory.

In the Finding Nemo franchise, one of Nemo's classmates, Pearl, is a flapjack octopus. Flapjack octopuses appear in Abzû along the sea floor in levels depicting the deep sea.
