= Opisthoteuthis persephone =

Conservation status
- Data Deficient (IUCN 3.1)

Scientific classification
- Kingdom: Animalia
- Phylum: Mollusca
- Class: Cephalopoda
- Order: Octopoda
- Family: Opisthoteuthidae
- Genus: Opisthoteuthis
- Species: O. persephone

Binomial name
- Opisthoteuthis persephone Berry, 1918

Species of octopus

Opisthoteuthis (Exsuperoteuthis) persephone is a cirrate octopus found off southern Australia. The species was described by S. Stillman Berry from eight specimens captured by the F.I.S. Endeavour in the early 1910s. In describing O. persephone, Berry called it an "exceedingly interesting octopod". The species has recently been redescribed and allocated as the type of genus Exsuperoteuthis.

== Description ==
According to the first description as given by Berry, Opisthoteuthis persephone was neither very small nor very large when compared to other octopuses, with the largest measuring 330 mm in arm span.

The species (like others of its family) is soft and gelatinous and is somewhat flat, almost disk-like given the extensive arm webbing, and has small fins. The arm suckers are sexually dimorphic, with males having enlarged suckers. The species has 80–90 suckers per arm, and on males 30–40 suckers on each arm are greatly enlarged (spanning most of the proximal and central arm regions). This pattern of male sucker enlargement is unique to the species. The species has 6 (rarely 7) lamellae per gill, and has a bilobed digestive gland. Externally, the animal is white or grey over the body, head and outer arm faces, with small spots along the arms, and is a greyish blue-purple on the oral faces of the arms and webbing.

In 1993, John M. Healy described the spermatozoa of this species (using museum specimens).

== Distribution ==
Exsuperoteuthis persephone was originally described from material collected in the Great Australian Bight (southern Australia) and off southeastern Australia. With collection of additional material the species is now known from most of southern Australia, including off Tasmania, Victoria, New South Wales, South Australia, and Western Australia. The species is benthic (occurring on or just above the seafloor) from 274–595 m depth.
