= Opisthoteuthis mero =

Conservation status
- Endangered (IUCN 3.1)

- Declining (NZ TCS)

Scientific classification
- Domain: Eukaryota
- Kingdom: Animalia
- Phylum: Mollusca
- Class: Cephalopoda
- Order: Octopoda
- Suborder: Cirrina
- Family: Opisthoteuthidae
- Genus: Opisthoteuthis
- Species: O. mero

Binomial name
- Opisthoteuthis mero O'Shea 1999

Species of octopus

Opisthoteuthis mero, commonly known as Mero's umbrella octopus, is a species of cirrate octopus from demersal habitats surrounding New Zealand. O. mero is the most documented New Zealand Opisthoteuthis species, with over 100 reference specimens. O. mero reaches a maximum length of 34 cm (13 in), and a mantle length of 9 cm (3.5 in).

== Distribution and habitat ==
Opisthoteuthis mero is known solely from soft sediments from 360–1,000 m (1,180–3,280 ft) deep, with most specimens recorded at depths of 400–900 m (1,300–3,000 ft). The type locality of O. mero is: 36°52'S, 176°19'E, 510 m, on the northern end of New Zealand. This species was originally found in virtually all waters surrounding New Zealand.

== Conservation ==
O. mero is listed as Endangered by the IUCN due to the effects of commercial deep-water trawling upon population size. Prior to 1998, Opisthoteuthis species were common bycatch species from scampi fisheries in the Bay of Plenty and Auckland Islands. The longevity of Opisthoteuthis species along with their low fecundity and slow growth (primarily within embryonic development which may take 1.4-2.6 years among other species in the genus) have made many species easily susceptible to precipitous population declines, and slow recoveries.
