= Opisthoteuthis hardyi =

Conservation status
- Data Deficient (IUCN 3.1)

Scientific classification
- Kingdom: Animalia
- Phylum: Mollusca
- Class: Cephalopoda
- Order: Octopoda
- Family: Opisthoteuthidae
- Genus: Opisthoteuthis
- Species: O. hardyi

Binomial name
- Opisthoteuthis hardyi Villanueva, Collins, Sánchez, & Voss, 2002

Species of mollusc

Opisthoteuthis hardyi is a lesser-known octopus species. It was described in 2002 from a male caught off the Shag Rocks, which are far south in the Atlantic Ocean near the Falkland Islands.

The specimen was medium-sized, with a mantle of 45 mm (1.8 in) long. The whole body was 250 mm (9.8 in) long. It had some enlarged suckers, which is typical for male octopuses belonging to Opisthoteuthis. It also had a web connecting its long arms, which is common for cirrate octopuses and some incirrate octopuses.

The specimen was found in the open ocean between 800 m (2,600 ft) and 1,000 m (3,300 ft) deep. However, the true depth range is wider. After 2002, dozens more specimens, likely O. hardyi, were discovered on the Patagonian Shelf from 630–1,390 m (2,070–4,560 ft) deep.
