= Opisthoteuthis albatrossi =

Conservation status
- Data Deficient (IUCN 3.1)

Scientific classification
- Kingdom: Animalia
- Phylum: Mollusca
- Class: Cephalopoda
- Order: Octopoda
- Family: Opisthoteuthidae
- Genus: Opisthoteuthis
- Species: O. albatrossi

Binomial name
- Opisthoteuthis albatrossi (Sasaki, 1920)

Synonyms
- Grimpoteuthis albatrossi (Sasaki, 1920); Stauroteuthis albatrossi Sasaki, 1920

Species of octopus

Opisthoteuthis albatrossi (common name in Japanese: オオクラゲダコ) is a cirrate octopus originally found off Kinkasan in Japan. This species was described from only four specimens. It is similar to Opisthoteuthis californiana; the two may be the same species. It is also similar to Opisthoteuthis japonica.

O. albatrossi lives in the North Pacific, from Japanese waters to the Sea of Okhotsk. It exists at recorded depths of 486 to 1,679 m (0.3 to 1.0 mi) below the surface.

== Description ==
Opisthoteuthis albatrossi is a small octopus; its total length is 15 to 20 cm (6 to 8 in). Each arm has more than 80 suckers, and males have some very enlarged suckers, typical to opisthoteuthids. Like other cirrate octopuses, it has a thick, fleshy web connecting its arms; a small internal shell to support its body; and cirri on its arms.
