= Opisthoteuthis philipii =

Conservation status
- Data Deficient (IUCN 3.1)

Scientific classification
- Kingdom: Animalia
- Phylum: Mollusca
- Class: Cephalopoda
- Order: Octopoda
- Family: Opisthoteuthidae
- Genus: Opisthoteuthis
- Species: O. philipii

Binomial name
- Opisthoteuthis philipii Oommmen, 1976

Species of octopus

Opisthoteuthis philipii is an octopus of the Indian Ocean. It lives off the coast of Kerala, India. Known specimens were found between 275–365 m (902–1,198 ft) deep in the Arabian Sea near Alappuzha.

== Description ==
Oommen described the species based on three animals. Not much is known about the species beyond these specimens. Oommen found that the arms were different lengths, and that his specimens, like many other cirrate ("Dumbo") octopuses, had thick webs connecting their arms. The cirri are retractable. Cirri are the small, thread-like structures that give cirrate octopuses their name. They line the octopuses' arms. Opisthoteuthis philipii is distinguishable from other Opisthoteuthis species by its uniquely shaped beak. The mantle, which contains most of the vital organs, measures up to 140 mm (5.5 in). At maximum, the animal is 470 mm (19 in) long.
