= Opisthoteuthis pluto =

Conservation status
- Data Deficient (IUCN 3.1)

Scientific classification
- Kingdom: Animalia
- Phylum: Mollusca
- Class: Cephalopoda
- Order: Octopoda
- Family: Opisthoteuthidae
- Genus: Opisthoteuthis
- Species: O. pluto

Binomial name
- Opisthoteuthis pluto Berry, 1918

Species of octopus

Opisthoteuthis pluto is a deep-sea cirrate octopus found off southern Australia in the bathyal zone. The species was described by S. Stillman Berry in 1918, and has recently been re-described. The species is named for the Greek and Roman god of the Underworld.

== Description ==
The octopus is known from multiple specimens. The largest specimen, a male, spanned 540 mm (21 in) from arm tip to arm tip. Like other members of the genus Opisthoteuthis, this octopus is sexually dimorphic, the males having enlarged suckers on distinct regions of the arms. The species has 80–85 suckers per arm, with males having a region of proximal suckers enlarged (from the 4th to 9th or 10th sucker, near the mouth). The species is distinct in lacking any distally enlarged suckers on the male. Some sources note the species as having enlarged suckers on distal arm regions, but this was not noted in Berry's original description and seems to stem from confusion with the recently described Insigniteuthis obscura. The species has 8 lamellae on each gill, and unlike other southern Australian Opisthoteuthis has a unilobed digestive gland (liver), it has some unique modifications to its reproductive system that distinguishes it from other species. According to S. Stillman Berry, who described O. pluto, the octopus was capable of partially retracting its suckers and cirri (the small tendrils lining the arms). The octopus has a dark color, which helps it camouflage with the ocean floor.

== Distribution ==
Opisthoteuthis pluto was originally described from material collected in the central Great Australian Bight, off southern Australia, and some additional material has been collected off southeastern Australia. The species is benthic and occurs over a depth range of approximately 250–823 m.
