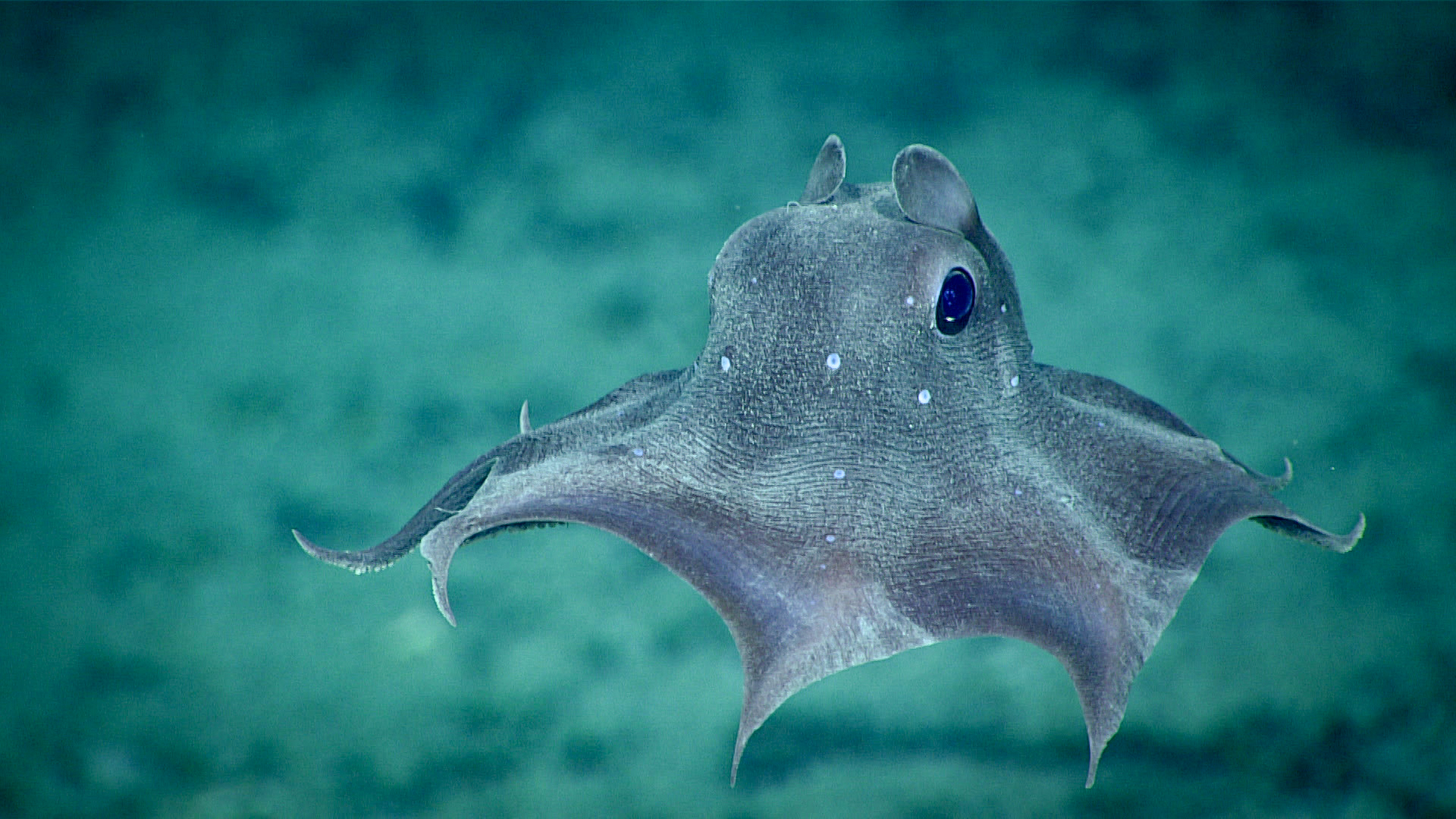
- Opisthoteuthis agassizii in the Gulf of Mexico in 2019

Scientific classification
- Kingdom: Animalia
- Phylum: Mollusca
- Class: Cephalopoda
- Order: Octopoda
- Family: Opisthoteuthidae
- Genus: Opisthoteuthis; Verrill, 1883

Type species
- Opisthoteuthis agassizii Verrill, 1883

Synonyms
- Cirroteuthopsis Grimpe, 1920; Teuthidiscus Berry, 1918

= Opisthoteuthis =

Genus of octopuses

Opisthoteuthis, from Ancient Greek ὄπισθεν (ópisthen), meaning "back", and τευθίς (teuthís), meaning "squid", is a genus of cirrate octopuses, sometimes known as flapjack octopuses, which are found in all the world's oceans.

== Behavior ==
Like other cirrates, octopuses in Opisthoteuthis are generally small, and many dwell in the deep sea. They have cirri on their arms, internal shells to support their bodies, and muscular fins for steering. Like octopuses of Grimpoteuthis, opisthoteuthids have been seen resting or crawling on the seafloor.

== Species ==
These 25 species have been placed in Opisthoteuthis:

Scientific name	Authority (Note: A binomial authority in parentheses indicates that the species was originally described in a genus other than Opisthoteuthis.)	IUCN Red List Status	Picture
Opisthoteuthis agassizii	Verrill, 1883	DD^{IUCN}	
Opisthoteuthis albatrossi	(Sasaki, 1920)	DD^{IUCN}	
Opisthoteuthis borealis	Collins, 2005	DD^{IUCN}	
Opisthoteuthis bruuni	(Voss, 1982)	DD^{IUCN}	
Opisthoteuthis californiana	Berry, 1949	DD^{IUCN}	
Opisthoteuthis calypso	Villanueva, Collins, Sánchez & Voss, 2002	VU^{IUCN}	
Opisthoteuthis carnarvonensis	Verhoeff, 2025		
Opisthoteuthis chathamensis	O'Shea, 1999	CR^{IUCN}	
Opisthoteuthis depressa	Ijima & Ikeda, 1895	DD^{IUCN}	
Opisthoteuthis dongshaensis	C. C. Lu, 2010	DD^{IUCN}	
Opisthoteuthis extensa	Thiele, 1915	DD^{IUCN}	
Opisthoteuthis grimaldii	(Joubin, 1903)	DD^{IUCN}	
Opisthoteuthis hardyi	Villanueva, Collins, Sánchez & Voss, 2002	DD^{IUCN}	
Opisthoteuthis japonica	Taki, 1962	DD^{IUCN}	
Opisthoteuthis kerberos	Verhoeff, 2024		
Opisthoteuthis massyae	(Grimpe, 1920)	VU^{IUCN}	
Opisthoteuthis medusoides	Thiele, 1915	DD^{IUCN}	
Opisthoteuthis mero	O'Shea, 1999	EN^{IUCN}	
Opisthoteuthis persephone	Berry, 1918	DD^{IUCN}	
Opisthoteuthis philipii	Oommen, 1976	DD^{IUCN}	
Opisthoteuthis pluto	Berry, 1918	DD^{IUCN}	
Opisthoteuthis robsoni	O'Shea, 1999	DD^{IUCN}	
