= Hochbergellus =

Conservation status
- Critically Imperiled (NatureServe)

Scientific classification
- Kingdom: Animalia
- Phylum: Mollusca
- Class: Gastropoda
- Order: Stylommatophora
- Family: Polygyridae
- Subfamily: Triodopsinae
- Tribe: Vespericolini
- Genus: Hochbergellus; B.Roth & W.B.Miller, 1992
- Species: H. hirsutus

Binomial name
- Hochbergellus hirsutus B.Roth & W.B.Miller, 1992

Genus of gastropods

Hochbergellus is a monotypic genus of air-breathing land snails, animal pulmonate gastropod mollusks in the family Polygyridae.

This genus of snails has only one species, which is not distinguishable from species of the genus Vespericola on the basis of shell characters. The two genera are distinguished only by internal anatomical characters.

The genus was named in honor of the malacologist Frederick George "Eric" Hochberg of the Santa Barbara Museum of Natural History.

== Distribution ==
Hochbergellus is restricted to coastal Oregon, U.S.A.

== Species ==
The sole species in this genus is:

- Hochbergellus hirsutus Roth and Miller, 1992 - Sisters hesperian
