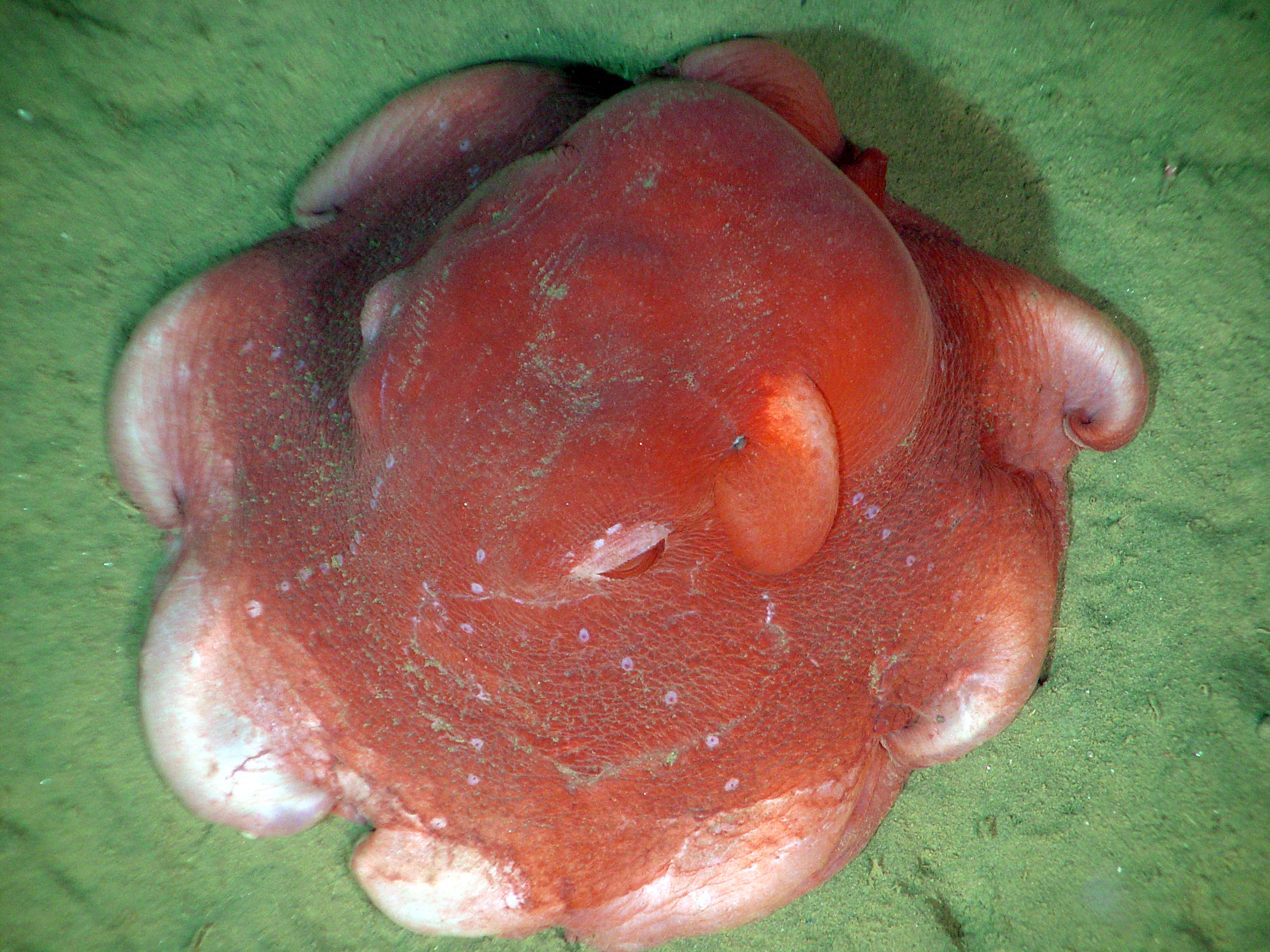
- Opisthoteuthis californiana

Scientific classification
- Kingdom: Animalia
- Phylum: Mollusca
- Class: Cephalopoda
- Order: Octopoda
- Suborder: Cirrina
- Family: Opisthoteuthidae; Verrill, 1896

Genera
- Opisthoteuthis; Insigniteuthis; Exsuperoteuthis

= Umbrella octopus =

Umbrella octopuses

Family of molluscs

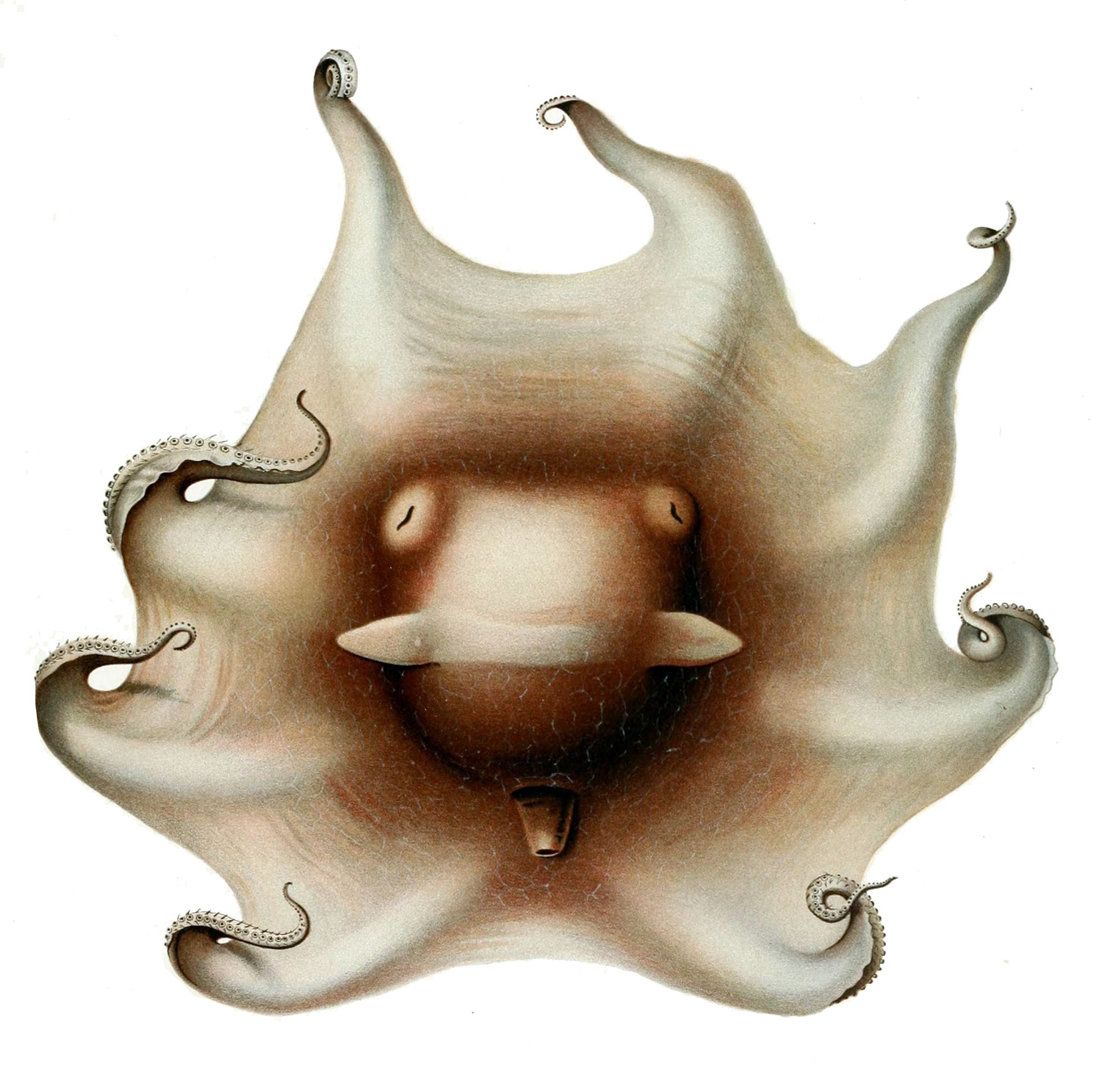
Opisthoteuthis extensa

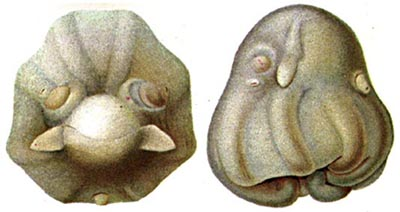
Opisthoteuthis medusoides

Opisthoteuthidae, from Ancient Greek ὄπισθεν (ópisthen), meaning "back", and τευθίς (teuthís), meaning "squid", known as umbrella octopuses, are a group of pelagic octopuses. Umbrella octopuses are characterized by a web of skin between the arms, causing them to somewhat resemble an opened umbrella when the arms are spread.

== Description ==
Opisthoteuthidae are a group of octopuses characterized by a web of skin in between their arms. They have a broad U-shaped shell that support muscles for a pair of small fins on the mantle, these fins are far less developed than other families in Cirrina and essentially only act as stabilizers when the animal swims (using a medusoid motion of the arms and webbing). This structure makes the umbrella octopus resemble an umbrella when they spread their arms/web out. The structure of the umbrella octopus has the oral surface below the mantle of the octopuses and the web with their arms surround the bottom of the mantle. Their outer skin has a very delicate consistency that results in white spots appearing on their skin when damaged. Although Opisthoteuthidae are categorized as cirrates, unlike the other cirrates, they do not have an intermediate web; rather, they use the web in between their arms to mimic the intermediate web that other cirrates have. The lack of an intermediate web is the cause of the indentations in the outer edge of their arms that make them look like an umbrella.

== Behavior ==
=== Defense mechanisms ===
Opisthoteuthidae lack an intermediate web but they mimic the defensive mechanism of ballooning by extending the web between their arms as much as possible and curving the outer edges of their arms inwards in order to have the edges touch the ground. They also extend their fins parallel to the floor to help keep their balance or they curve them around their mantle. Opisthoteuthidae have been observed to hold this position for five and a half minutes. Another defensive mechanism that Opisthoteuthidae have been observed using is web-inversion which is when they have their arms turned upwards and their web with the oral surface facing outwards. The oral surface can be facing the floor, or the octopuses may lie laterally so their side is in contact with the floor. It has been noted that these defensive behaviors are the positions the octopuses may go into while feeding as well, but it is possible that this could be because of the stress of being captured and placed in an aquarium to be observed.

=== Resting behavior ===
When resting at the floor, the octopus's behavior falls into one of two tactics: bottom-resting or flat-spreading. Bottom-resting is when the octopus is resting near the floor. It will erect its mantle, curve the outer edges of its arms inwards to have them be the only part making contact with the floor. The fins are extended out parallel to the bottom to maintain balance. When flat-spreading they spread their arms and web, so it is parallel to the bottom and they keep the edges of their arms curved inwards. Their heads will point backwards at a small angle and their fins will be used for stabilization.

== Dispersion ==
Opisthoteuthidae are deep sea creatures that have been found in the Clipperton-Clarion Fracture Zone in the Pacific Ocean at a depth of about 4,800 m. They have also been found in the South China Sea. They stay within 3,000-4,000 meters below sea level and try to stay hovering over the ocean floor.

== Taxonomy ==
Family Opisthoteuthidae has classically contained a single genus, Opisthoteuthis, which has recently been split into three genera on the basis of differences in enlarged suckers on male specimens. Genera Grimpoteuthis, Luteuthis, and Cryptoteuthis now are included in the family Grimpoteuthidae.

- Genus Opisthoteuthis Verrill, 1883
  - Opisthoteuthis agassizii Verrill, 1883
  - Opisthoteuthis albatrossi (Sasaki, 1920)
  - Opisthoteuthis borealis Collins, 2005
  - Opisthoteuthis bruuni (Voss, 1982)
  - Opisthoteuthis californiana Berry, 1949
  - Opisthoteuthis carnarvonensis Verhoeff, 2025
  - Opisthoteuthis chathamensis O'Shea, 1999
  - Opisthoteuthis grimaldii (Joubin, 1903)
  - Opisthoteuthis hardyi Villanueva, Collins, Sánchez & Voss, 2002
  - Opisthoteuthis kerberos Verhoeff, 2024
  - Opisthoteuthis massyae (Grimpe, 1920) (Synonym Opisthoteuthis vossi Sánchez & Guerra, 1989 )
  - Opisthoteuthis medusoides Thiele, 1915
  - Opisthoteuthis mero O'Shea, 1999
  - Opisthoteuthis philipii Oommen, 1976
  - Opisthoteuthis pluto Berry, 1918
  - Opisthoteuthis robsoni O'Shea, 1999
- Genus Exsuperoteuthis Verhoeff, 2024
  - Exsuperoteuthis depressa Ijima & Ikeda, 1895 (Synonym Opisthoteuthis japonica Taki, 1962)
  - Exsuperoteuthis persephone Berry, 1918
- Genus Insigniteuthis Verhoeff, 2024
  - Insigniteuthis calypso Villanueva, Collins, Sánchez & Voss, 2002 [Possibly attributable to genus Insigniteuthis]
  - Insigniteuthis dongshaensis C. C. Lu, 2010 [attributed to genus Insigniteuthis]
  - Insigniteuthis extensa Thiele, 1915 [attributed to genus Insigniteuthis]
  - Insigniteuthis obscura Verhoeff, 2024
