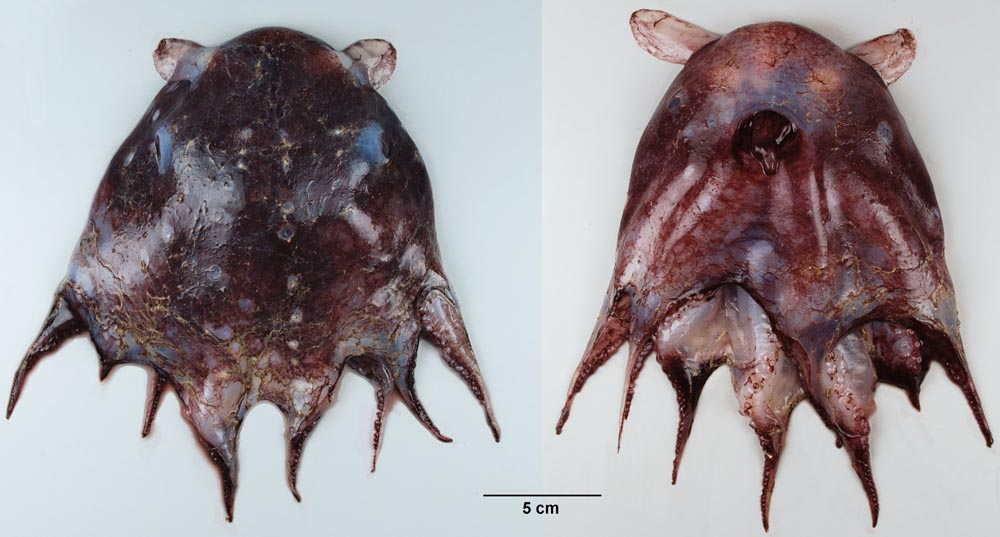

Conservation status
- Critically Endangered (IUCN 3.1)

Scientific classification
- Kingdom: Animalia
- Phylum: Mollusca
- Class: Cephalopoda
- Order: Octopoda
- Family: Opisthoteuthidae
- Genus: Opisthoteuthis
- Species: O. chathamensis

Binomial name
- Opisthoteuthis chathamensis O'Shea 1999

= Opisthoteuthis chathamensis =

Species of octopus

Opisthoteuthis chathamensis, commonly known as the roughy umbrella octopus, is a species of cirrate octopus found in demersal habitats surrounding the Chatham Rise in New Zealand and Macquarie Island (Australian Antarctic Territories).

== Description ==
Opisthoteuthis chathamensis reaches a maximum length of 18 cm (7.1 in) TL, and a mantle length of 5.4 cm (2.1 in). They are described as having subequal arms with around 41-45 suckers in males and 45-55 suckers in females. Their oral surface and the webbing between their tentacles is maroon and the suckers are a pale cream.

== Distribution ==
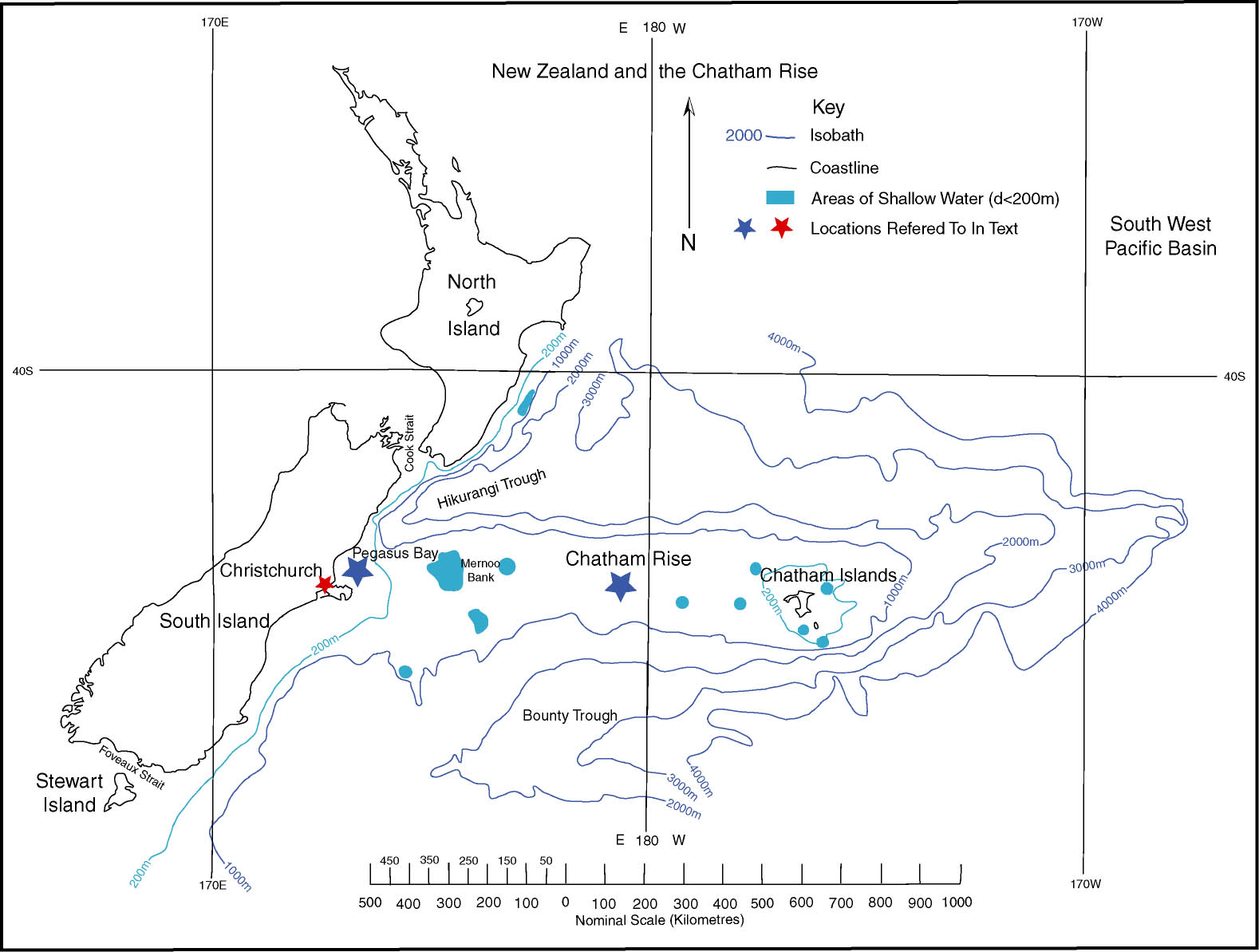
Chatham Rise, the type locality of O. chathamensis

The type locality of O. chathamensis is near the Chatham Islands at 44°44'S, 77°15'W, 1,180 m (3,870 ft), and was found more broadly around the Chatham Rise, off New Zealand, over a depth range of 900–1,438 metres (2,950–4,720 ft), living on soft sediments..

The species has also more recently been collected from Macquarie Island, to the South West of New Zealand.

== Conservation status ==
Opisthoteuthis chathamensis is listed as Critically Endangered by the IUCN due to a 70% decrease in population size in recent years, and has not been seen since 1999, when it was a common bycatch species. In addition, their longevity, low fecundity and slow growth (especially embryonic development which lasts 1.4-2.6 years among other species in the genus) has made them particularly susceptible to population declines and slow recoveries.
