= Opisthoteuthis bruuni =

Conservation status
- Data Deficient (IUCN 3.1)

Scientific classification
- Kingdom: Animalia
- Phylum: Mollusca
- Class: Cephalopoda
- Order: Octopoda
- Family: Opisthoteuthidae
- Genus: Opisthoteuthis
- Species: O. bruuni

Binomial name
- Opisthoteuthis bruuni Voss, 1982

Synonyms
- Grimpoteuthis bruuni

Species of mollusc

Opisthoteuthis bruuni is a species of finned cirrate octopus found along the western coast of the Americas from Chile to as far north as California. Their tissue is almost jelly-like, and they have short, round bodies. The octopus was named for Anton Bruun, a Danish ichthyologist.

The species was originally placed in the genus Grimpoteuthis; however, it was placed in Opisthoteuthis after some re-evaluation. The classification of cirrate octopuses is regularly revised as scientists learn more about these deep-sea octopuses. Recent genetic and molecular testing, for example, confirmed O. bruuni as a member of the family Opisthoteuthidae.

== Distribution ==
The species was originally collected off Antofagasta, Chile, at 250 to 360 m depth. Further specimens of O. bruuni have been collected from off Chile and Peru (between 5 and 33 degrees south), over a greater bathymetric range of 250 to 512 m depth.

More recently, the species has also been found to occur even further north, off the coasts of California (between Los Angeles and Monterey Bay). Specimens from this region were previously assumed to be an undescribed species informally called Opisthoteuthis "adorabilis" in some news articles, with the late malacologist F.G. "Eric" Hochberg also suspecting this population to be a new species (but he never managed to publish on it), however molecular and morphological data indicates that they are the same species as O. bruuni.

When originally described, the extensively gelatinous body and overall form led to the suggestion that O. bruuni is potentially a mid-water or pelagic species. This would be contrary to other Opisthoteuthis which are benthic. However, later research on O. bruuni seems to suggest a benthic habit as material is routinely collected in bottom trawls.

== Description & Ecology ==
The species was originally described from a set of 16 juvenile specimens. They were smaller than other known opisthoteuthids, reaching a maximum of 29 mm (1.1 in) mantle length. Even at this small, immature stage, the octopuses displayed sexual dimorphism (sex differences). The males had some enlarged suckers; three enormous suckers on each arm near the mouth were the most prominent, with a small cluster of enlarged suckers also present near the arm tips. This sort of sexual dimorphism is also found in other opisthoteuthids. Further specimens of O. bruuni have been collected from off Chile and Peru (between 5 and 33 degrees south), over a greater bathymetric range of 250 to 512 m depth. This later research also indicates a larger maximum body size (50 mm mantle length, 206 mm total length). Collection of further specimens off of California, indicate the species has a lower sucker count than other members of the family (averaging 35 per arm, maximum of 44) and has a yellow-orange pigmented skin that is easily abraded away during capture in nets.

The species is taken as bycatch in trawl fisheries due to its benthic occurrence, and thus may be threatened, but it is currently a data deficient species in the IUCN Red List of threatened species.
