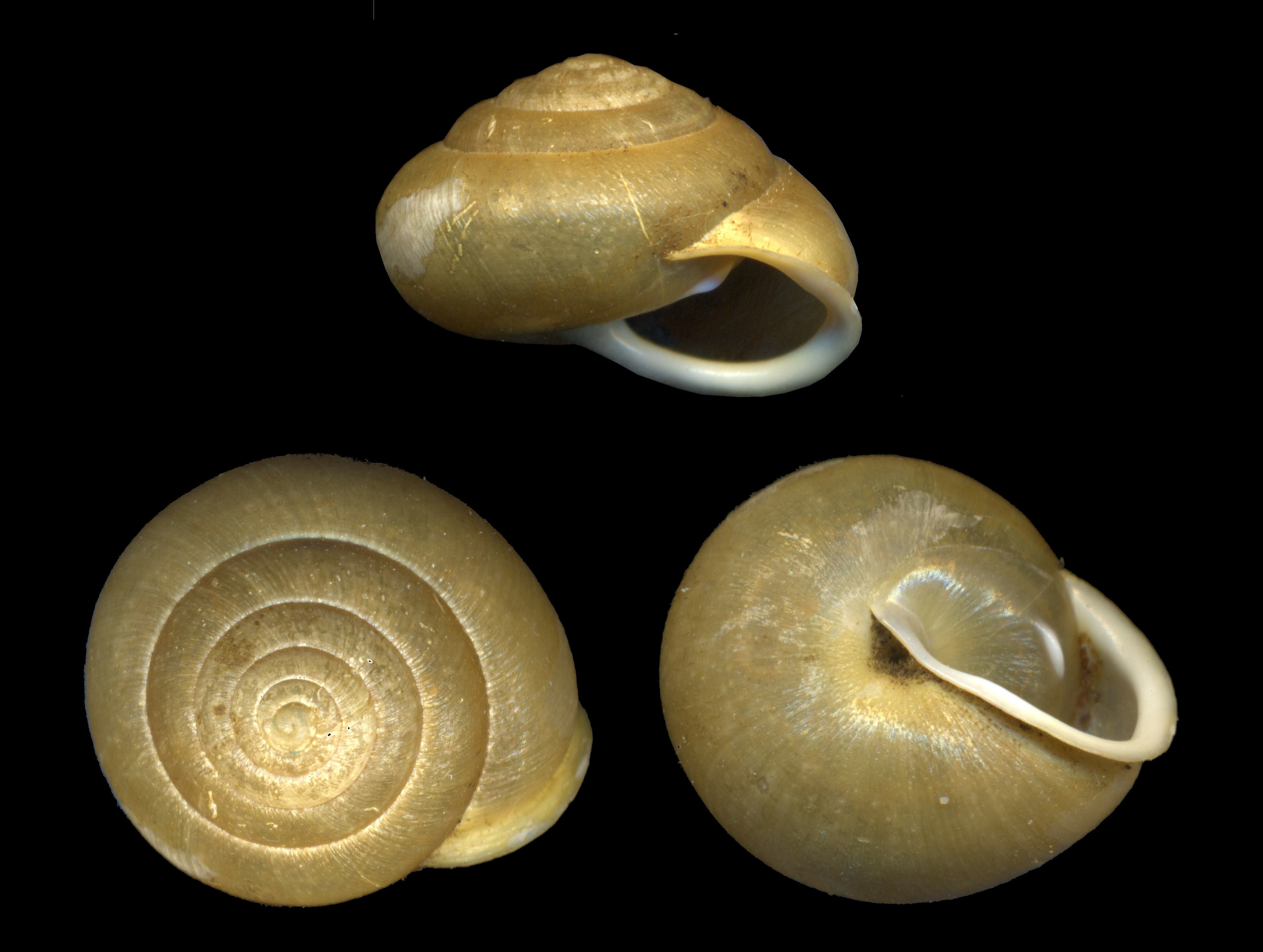
- Three views of a shell of Vespericola armigera

Scientific classification
- Kingdom: Animalia
- Phylum: Mollusca
- Class: Gastropoda
- Order: Stylommatophora
- Family: Polygyridae
- Subfamily: Triodopsinae
- Tribe: Vespericolini
- Genus: Vespericola; Pilsbry, 1939

= Vespericola =

Genus of gastropods

Vespericola is a genus of air-breathing land snails, terrestrial pulmonate gastropod molluscs in the family Polygyridae.

== Habitat ==
These snails are found along the Pacific Coast of North America, from southern Alaska and British Columbia to California.

== Shell description ==
The shells of these small to medium, globose or depressed globose snails are usually some shade of brown, sometimes without apertural teeth and sometimes with a single tooth on the parietal wall. Small periostracal hairs may be observed on the shell surface of many specimens, but the shells otherwise resemble those of Praticolella or Mesodon.

== Anatomy ==
According to Pilsbry (1940), Vespericola "differs from all other Polygyridae by the possession of a well-developed though rather short verge, and by the peculiar shape of the epiphallus".

== Species ==
Species within the genus Vespericola include:

- Vespericola armiger (Ancey, 1881) - Santa Cruz hesperian
- Vespericola columbiana (I. Lea, 1838) - northwest hesperian
  - Vespericola columbiana depressa (Pilsbry & Henderson, 1936)
  - Vespericola columbiana latilabrum Pilsbry, 1940
- Vespericola eritrichius (Berry, 1939) - velvet hesperian
- Vespericola hapla (Berry, 1933) - Butte Creek hesperian
- Vespericola karokorum Talmadge, 1962 - Karok hesperian
- Vespericola klamathicus Roth & W. B. Miller, 1995 - Klamath hesperia
- Vespericola marinensis Roth & W. B. Miller, 1993 - Marin hesperian
- Vespericola megasoma (Pilsbry, 1928) - redwood hesperian
- Vespericola megasoma euthales (Berry, 1939)
- Vespericola oria (Berry, 1933) - El Dorado hesperian
- Vespericola pilosa (Henderson, 1928) - brushfield hesperian
- Vespericola pinicola (Berry, 1916) - Monterey hesperian
- Vespericola pressleyi Roth, 1985 - Big Bar hesperian
- Vespericola rothi Cordero & W. B. Miller, 1995 - Ellery Creek hesperian
- Vespericola scotti Cordero & W. B. Miller, 1995 - Benson Gulch hesperian
- Vespericola shasta (Berry, 1921) - Shasta hesperian
- Vespericola sierrana (Berry, 1921) - Siskiyou hesperian
