= Karok hesperion =

Conservation status
- Data Deficient (IUCN 2.3)

- Secure (NatureServe)

Scientific classification
- Kingdom: Animalia
- Phylum: Mollusca
- Class: Gastropoda
- Order: Stylommatophora
- Family: Polygyridae
- Genus: Vespericola
- Species: V. karokorum

Binomial name
- Vespericola karokorum Talmadge, 1962

Species of gastropod

The Karok hesperion also known as the Karok Indian snail, scientific name Vespericola karokorum, is a species of air-breathing land snail, a terrestrial pulmonate gastropod mollusc in the family Polygyridae. This species is endemic to the United States.
