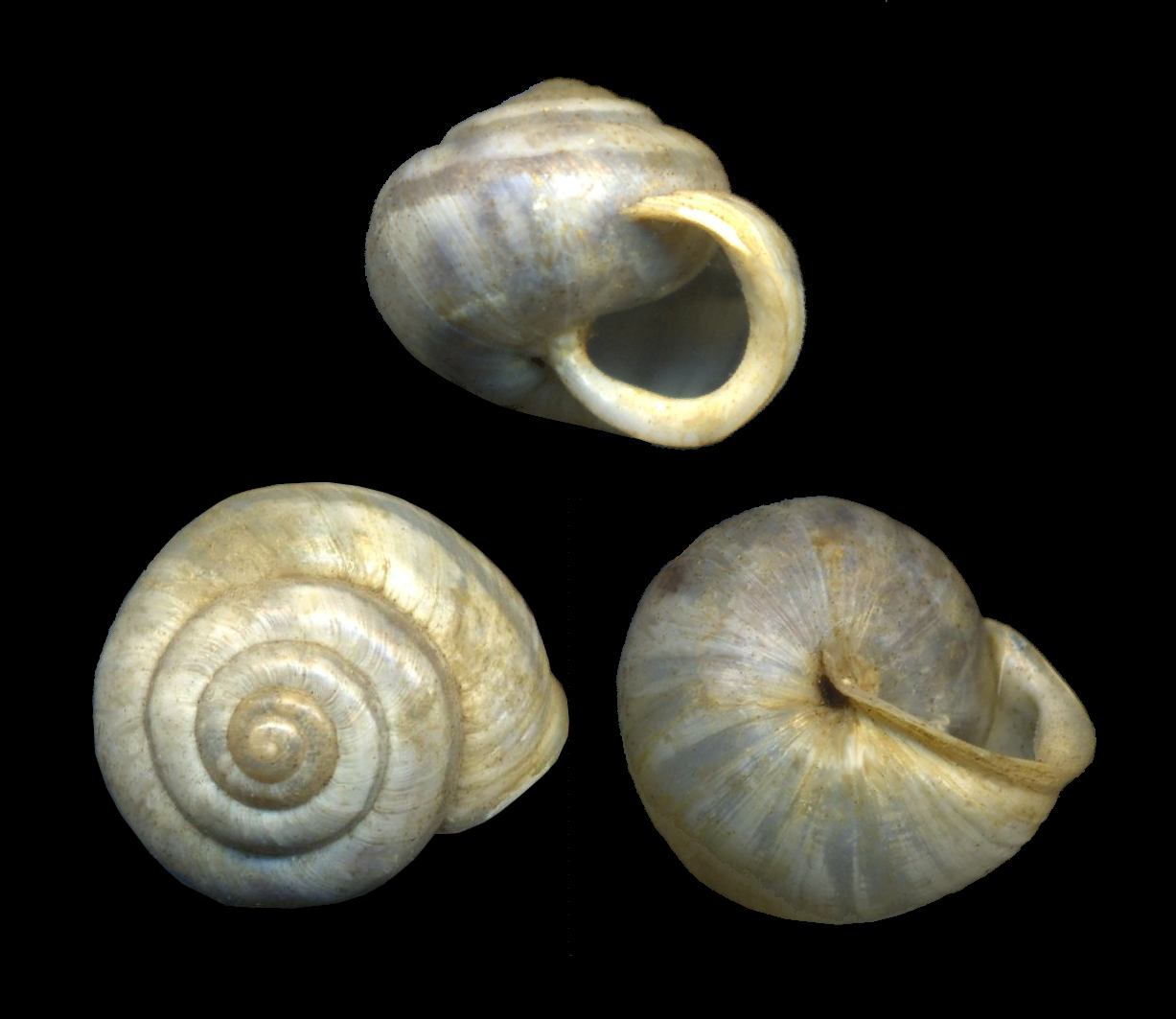
- Three views of the shell

Conservation status
- Vulnerable (NatureServe)

Scientific classification
- Kingdom: Animalia
- Phylum: Mollusca
- Class: Gastropoda
- Order: Stylommatophora
- Family: Polygyridae
- Genus: Praticolella
- Species: P. berlandieriana

Binomial name
- Praticolella berlandieriana (Moricand, 1833)

Synonyms
- Helix (Helocogena) berlandieriana S. Moricand, 1834; Praticolella (Praticolella) berlandieriana (S. Moricand, 1834)

= Praticolella berlandieriana =

Species of gastropod

Praticolella berlandieriana is a species of air-breathing land snail, a terrestrial pulmonate gastropod mollusk in the family Polygyridae.
