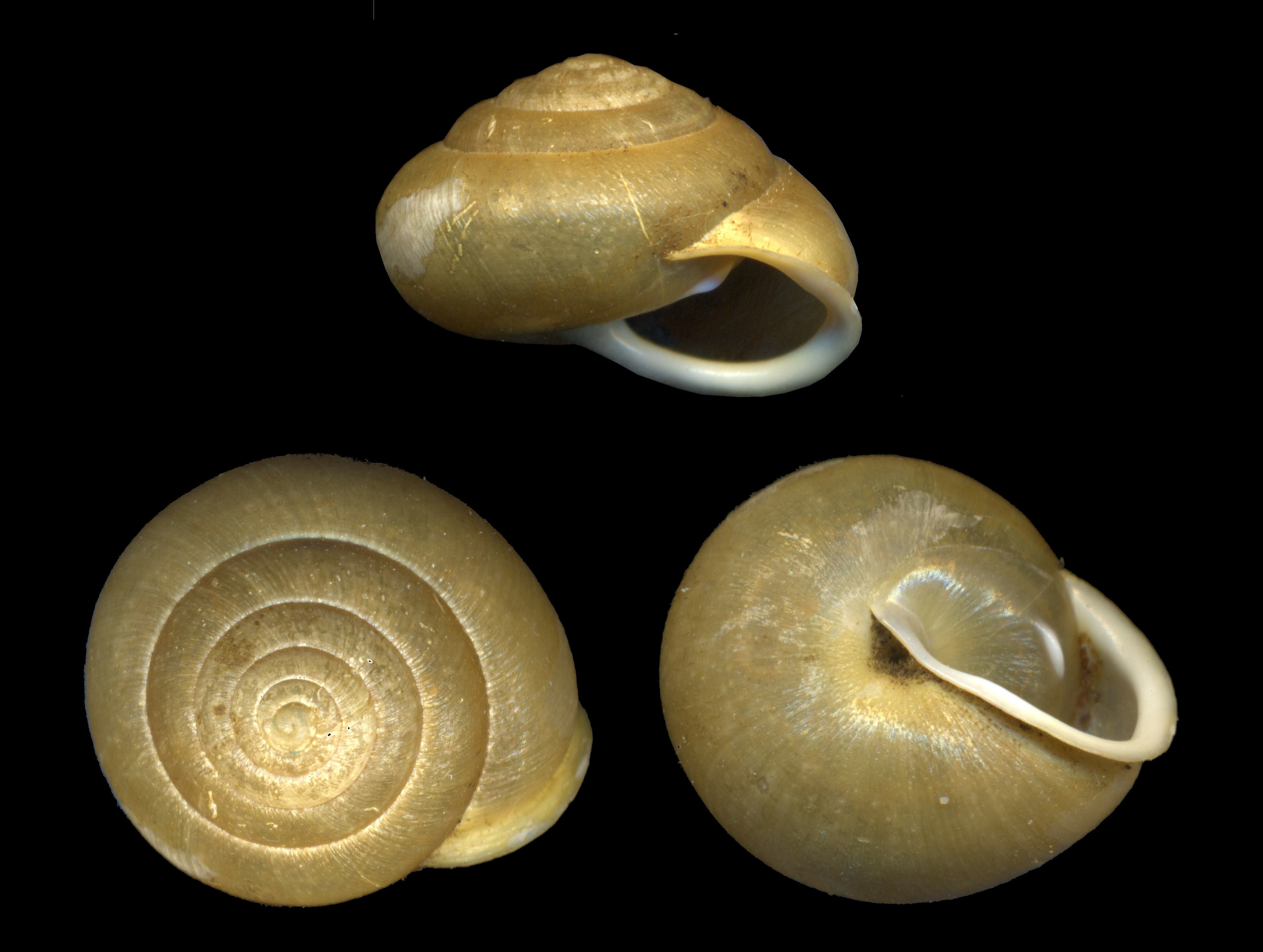
- Three views of a shell of Vespericola armiger

Conservation status
- Critically Imperiled (NatureServe)

Scientific classification
- Kingdom: Animalia
- Phylum: Mollusca
- Class: Gastropoda
- Order: Stylommatophora
- Family: Polygyridae
- Genus: Vespericola
- Species: V. armiger

Binomial name
- Vespericola armiger (Ancey, 1881)

Synonyms
- Helix (Mesodon) columbiana var. armigera Ancey, 1881; Mesodon columbiana var. dentata Tryon, 1867; Vespericola armigera (Ancey, 1881)

= Vespericola armiger =

Species of gastropod

Vespericola armiger, common name the Santa Cruz hesperian, is a species of air-breathing land snail, a terrestrial pulmonate gastropod mollusc in the family Polygyridae.
