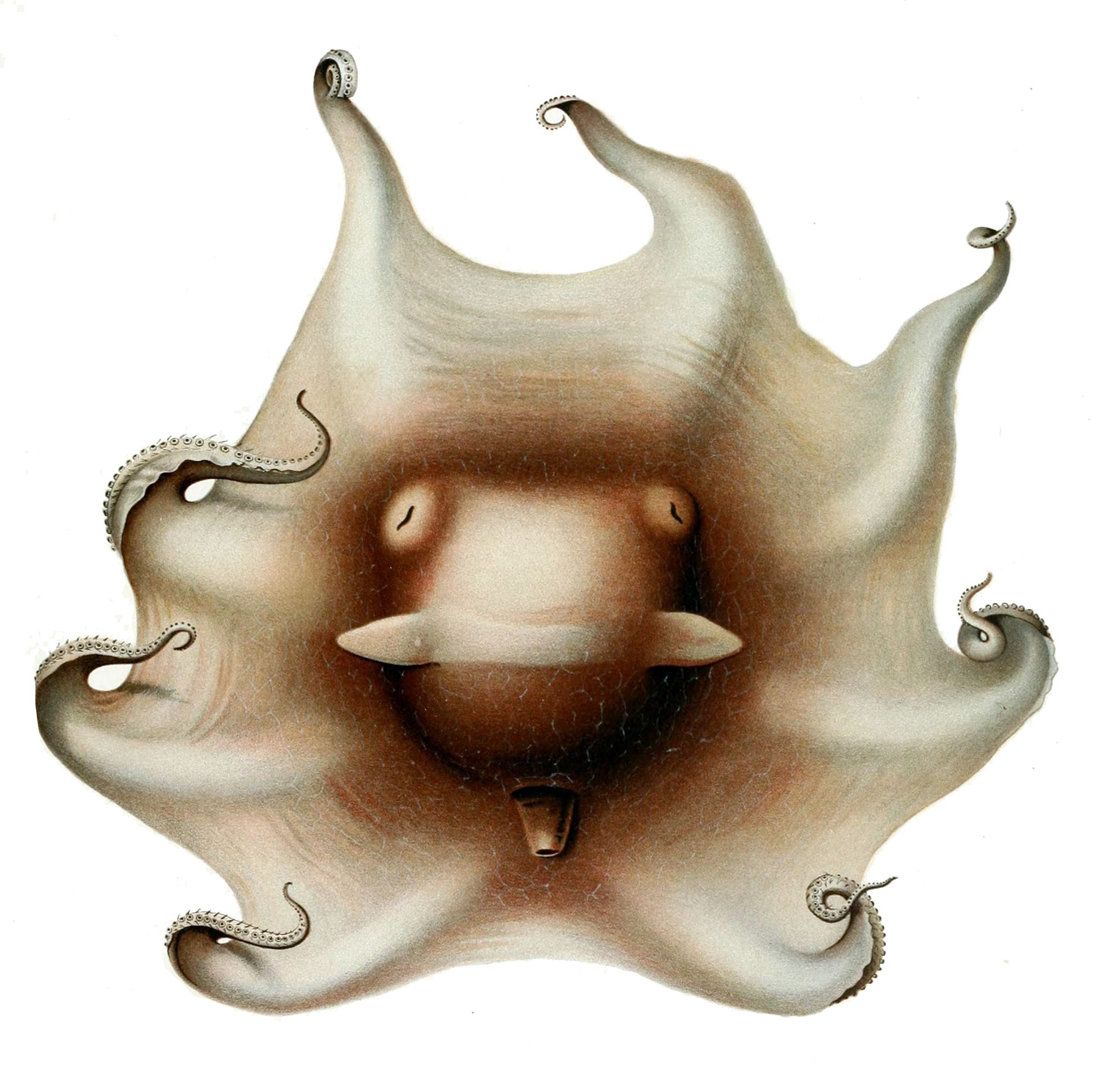
- Dorsal illustration of the female type specimen.

Conservation status
- Data Deficient (IUCN 3.1)

Scientific classification
- Kingdom: Animalia
- Phylum: Mollusca
- Class: Cephalopoda
- Order: Octopoda
- Family: Opisthoteuthidae
- Genus: Opisthoteuthis
- Species: O. extensa

Binomial name
- Opisthoteuthis extensa Thiele, 1915

= Opisthoteuthis extensa =

Species of octopus

Insigniteuthis extensa (formerly allocated to genus Opisthoteuthis) is a species of flapjack octopus from waters off Indonesia and north-western Australia.

The species was originally described from a single female specimen captured in 1899 off the west coast of Sumatra (Indonesia), at 768 m depth. The relatively basic original description rendered the species difficult to distinguish from others in the genus, with some authors even proposing similarity with Opisthoteuthis pluto.

The species was recently redescribed by re-examination of the type specimen and three additional specimens, two mature males from near the type locality, and another from off northwestern Australia, depth range 694–1073 m.

The species has up to 80 suckers per arm, mature males have a 'distal enlarged sucker field', a region with 4 enlarged suckers (2 or 3 massively per field) on each of arm pairs III and IV (near the junction with the webbing). The species also has multiple 'web nodules' (5–11) along the ventral edge of each arm (a rather unique feature). Internally with 6 or 7 lamellae on each gill, and with the shell and reproductive systems having more subtle differences relative to other species. The configuration of enlarged suckers was found to be very similar to Insigniteuthis dongshaensis from the South China Sea (another species originally allocated to genus Opisthoteuthis).

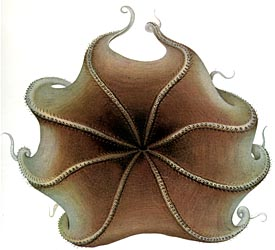
Oral view illustration
