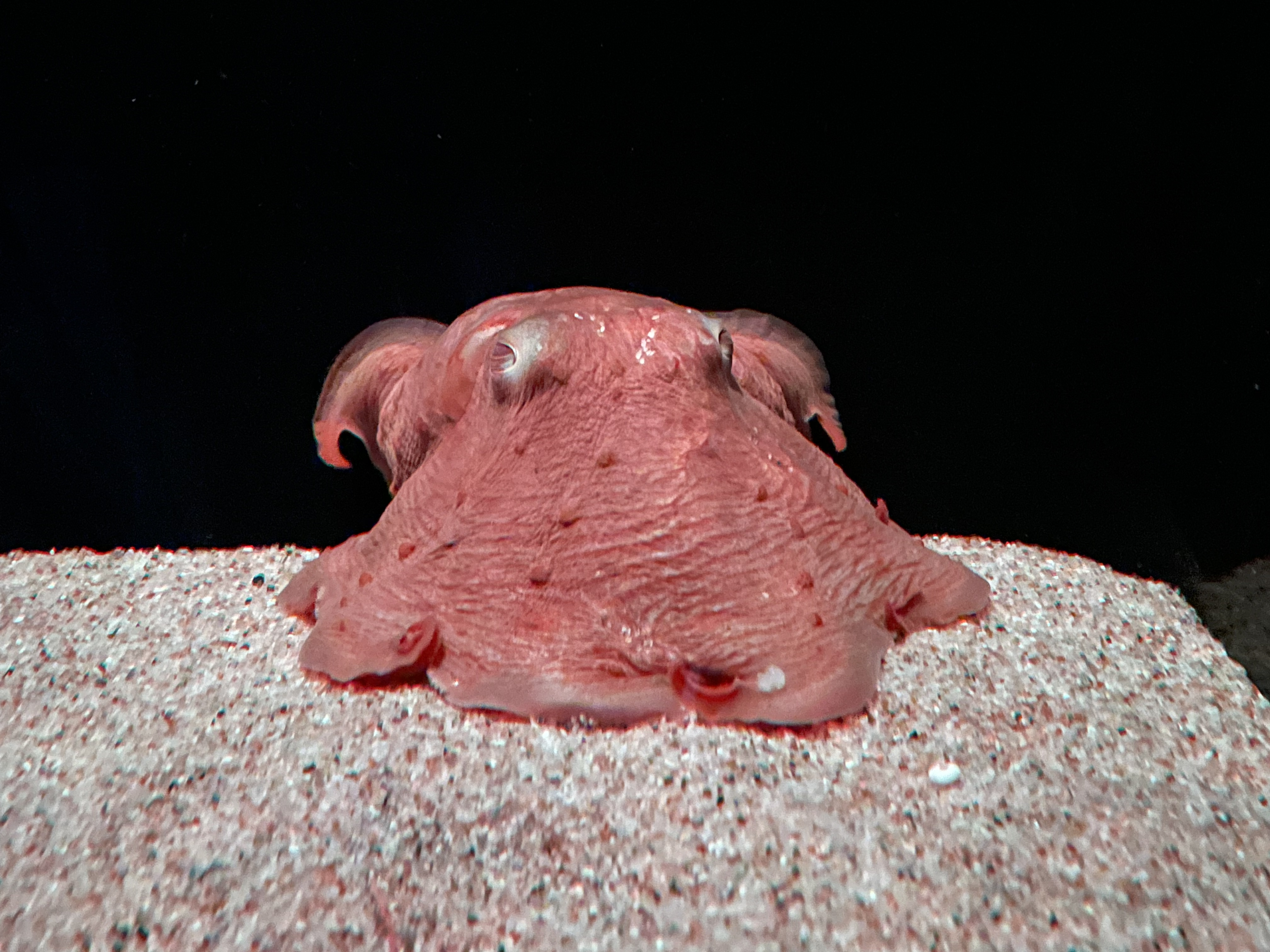
- E. depressa in Sunshine Aquarium, Tokyo.

Conservation status
- Data Deficient (IUCN 3.1)

Scientific classification
- Kingdom: Animalia
- Phylum: Mollusca
- Class: Cephalopoda
- Order: Octopoda
- Family: Opisthoteuthidae
- Genus: Exsuperoteuthis
- Species: E. depressa

Binomial name
- Exsuperoteuthis depressa (Ijima & Ikeda, 1895)

= Exsuperoteuthis depressa =

Species of octopus

Exsuperoteuthis depressa, synonym Opisthoteuthis depressa, also known as the Japanese flapjack octopus, is an octopus found in waters near Japan.

== Habitat ==
Most specimens of E. depressa live in the ocean's bathyal zone, where sunlight doesn't reach. Octopuses of this species have been found from 130–1,100 m (430–3,610 ft) below the surface. Like many other cirrate octopuses, they live on or above the seafloor. This species isn't of interest to commercial fisheries.

The first specimen described by scientists was found about 16 km (9.9 mi) west of Cape Sunosaki in Japan.

== Description ==
E. depressa is a small octopus. The animal's maximum size, measured from one arm tip to the opposite, is 200 mm (7.9 in). It has large eyes and small fins. Like other members of the cirrate octopus subgroup, it has a fleshy web connecting its arms, a small internal shell to support its body, fins to help it swim, and small fleshy tendrils called "cirri" lining its arms. The octopus may have been named for its relatively flattened or "depressed" body shape.

This octopus is very sexually dimorphic. While females have a row of more or less uniform suckers lining each arm, males have a distinctive sucker arrangement. Males' suckers are very enlarged and crowded together, often with two or three side by side. This trait distinguishes males of E. depressa from those of other species.

The preserved type specimen of E. depressa is held in the Tokyo University Museum.

E. depressa hosts the parasite Dicyemennea umbraculum, which belongs to the larger group Dicyemida. Parasites in this phylum target cephalopods.

In the early 2000s, scientists studied the mitochondrial DNA of some coleoid cephalopods (octopuses, squids, and cuttlefish). They found that E. depressa had split from other octopus lineages early on.
