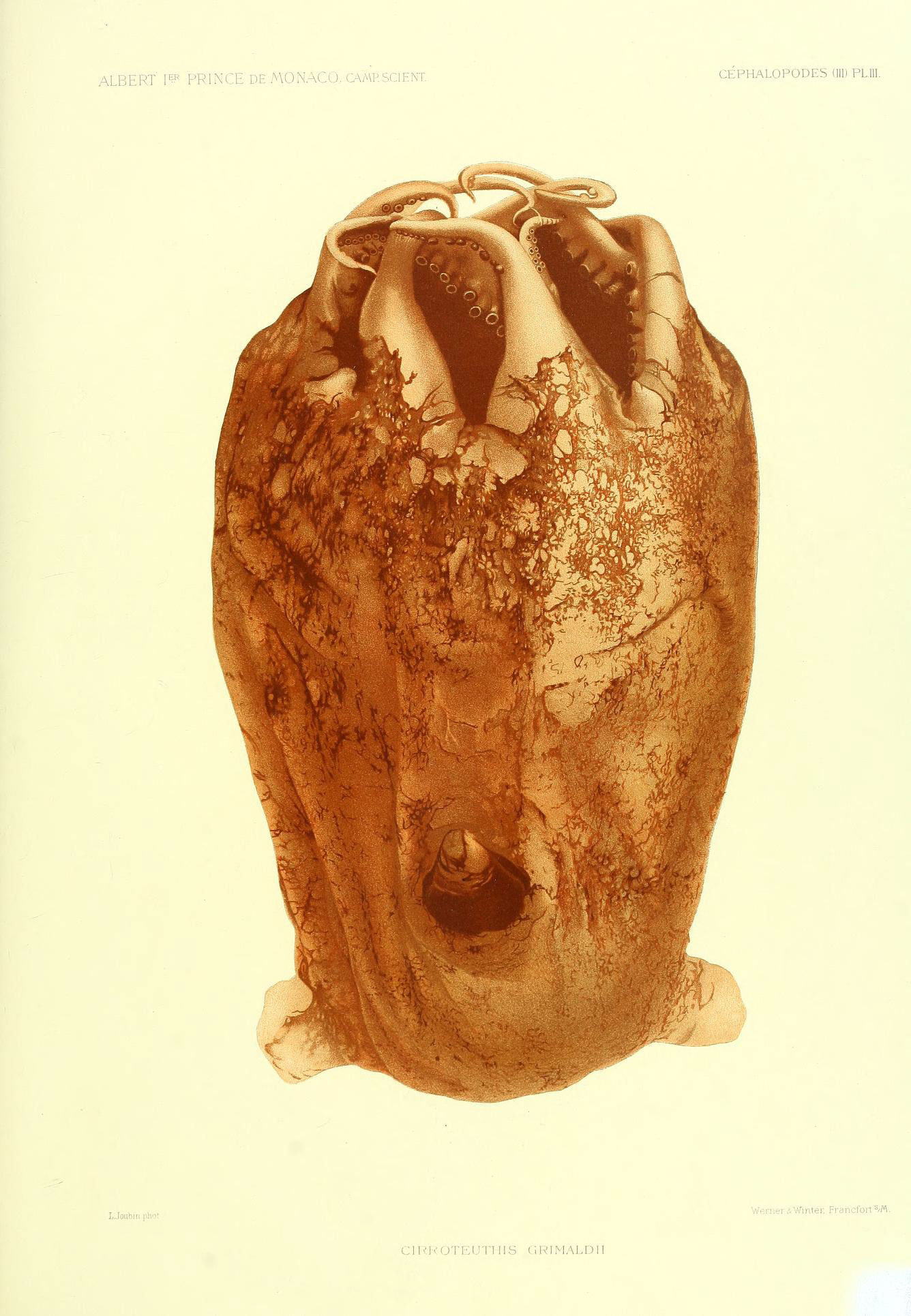

Conservation status
- Data Deficient (IUCN 3.1)

Scientific classification
- Kingdom: Animalia
- Phylum: Mollusca
- Class: Cephalopoda
- Order: Octopoda
- Family: Opisthoteuthidae
- Genus: Opisthoteuthis
- Species: O. grimaldii

Binomial name
- Opisthoteuthis grimaldii Joubin, 1903

Synonyms
- Cirroteuthis grimaldii; Grimpoteuthis grimaldii

= Opisthoteuthis grimaldii =

Species of octopus

Opisthoteuthis grimaldii is an octopus found near the Azores.

Opisthoteuthis grimaldii lives in the Northeast Atlantic Ocean from 1,135–2,287 m (3,724–7,503 ft) deep. This species lives far deeper than other Opisthoteuthis members in the Atlantic. The type specimen, upon which the species' description was based, was captured near Faial Island. The octopus has been found as far south as Namibian waters and as far north as British waters. In the early 1900s, many octopuses living all over the Atlantic and Indian oceans were classed as Opisthoteuthis grimaldii, but later scientists decided that only those specimens found in the Eastern Atlantic Ocean actually belonged to the species.

This octopus occupies in the bathyal zone, a deep area of the ocean where no sunlight reaches. Like many other cirrate octopuses, it lives on or just above the seafloor.

Opisthoteuthis grimaldii is anatomically very similar to Opisthoteuthis borealis, but the two species have differently structured digestive systems. It has also been confused with Opisthoteuthis massyae.

The octopus is only known from male specimens. The largest specimen was 250 mm (9.8 in) long, which is neither very large nor very small for an opisthoteuthid. Mature males have a few enlarged suckers on each arm; enlarged suckers are typical for males in the genus Opisthoteuthis. One potential female specimen has been found; however, it may not belong to the species.

The octopus has between 73 and 80 suckers on each arm. A fleshy web almost entirely covers O. grimaldii's arms. Like many cirrate octopuses, it doesn't have a radula.

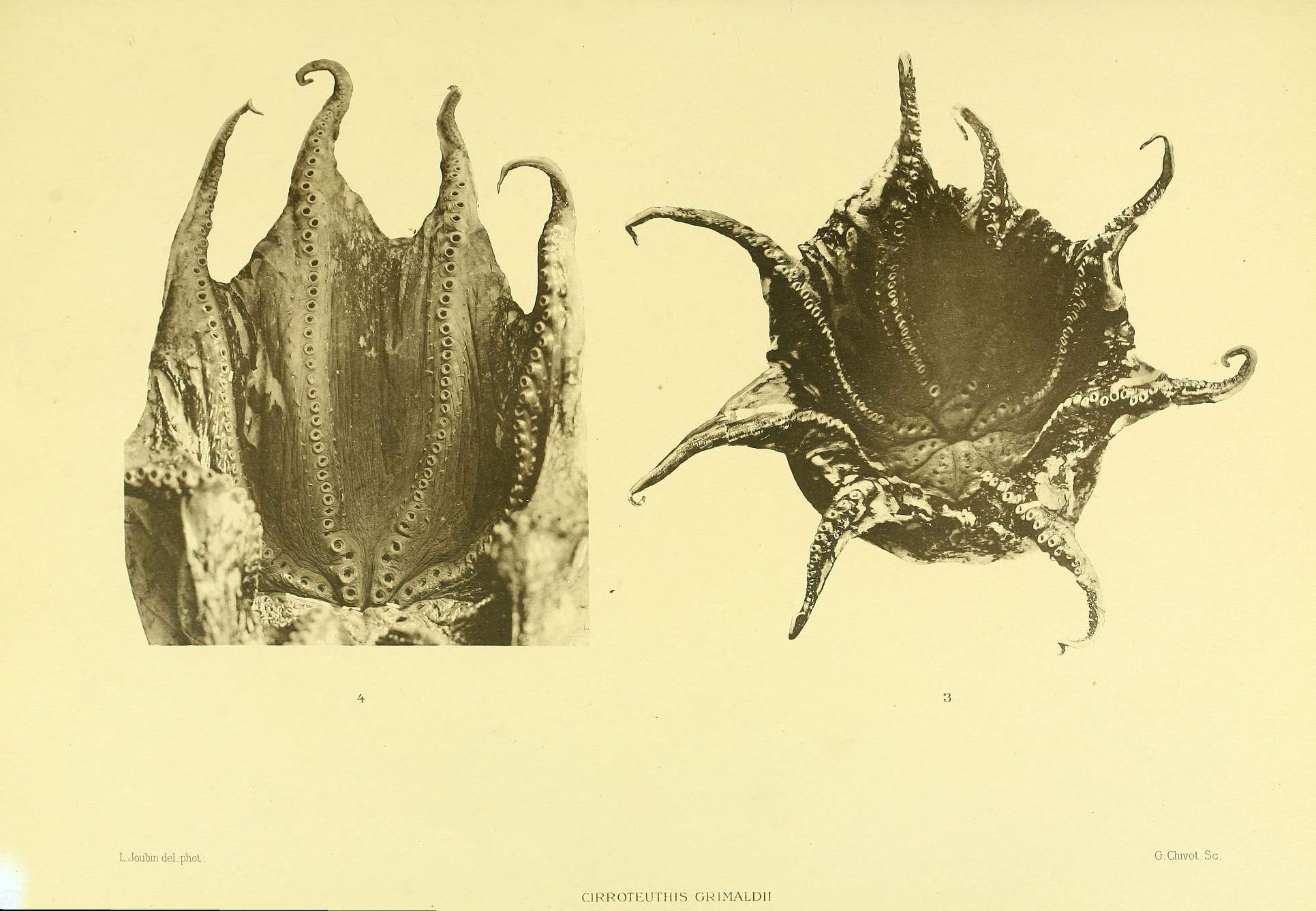
Oral view
