= Opisthoteuthis kerberos =

Scientific classification
- Kingdom: Animalia
- Phylum: Mollusca
- Class: Cephalopoda
- Order: Octopoda
- Family: Opisthoteuthidae
- Genus: Opisthoteuthis
- Species: O. kerberos

Binomial name
- Opisthoteuthis kerberos Verhoeff, 2024

Species of umbrella octopus

Opisthoteuthis kerberos, also known as the Kerberos flapjack octopus, is a species of umbrella octopus in the family Opisthoteuthidae. The species is known from 5 specimens collected off the eastern Bass Strait, southeastern Australia in 2000 by the former CSIRO research ship Southern Surveyor. The species is known from a depth of about 2000 meters.

The species has a bilobed digestive gland (liver) and is distinguished from similar species off New Zealand and Australia in details of the enlarged sucker patterns, male reproductive system, and digestive system.
