= Opisthoteuthis robsoni =

Conservation status
- Data Deficient (IUCN 3.1)

Scientific classification
- Kingdom: Animalia
- Phylum: Mollusca
- Class: Cephalopoda
- Order: Octopoda
- Family: Opisthoteuthidae
- Genus: Opisthoteuthis
- Species: O. robsoni

Binomial name
- Opisthoteuthis robsoni O'Shea, 1999

Species of mollusc

Opisthoteuthis robsoni, also known as the deep-water umbrella octopus, is a deep-sea octopus living off New Zealand on the Chatham Rise. It has been found from 1,178–1,723 m (3,865–5,653 ft) below the surface. Not much is known about the octopus' habitat or life cycle, as only four specimens have been found. It occupies the benthic zone, or the seafloor and the water directly above it. O. robsoni eats large amphipods.

The four specimens found so far are male. The species is somewhat large for a cirrate octopus, reaching a total length of 362 mm (14.3 in) long. The mantle, or body, was 65 mm (2.6 in) long. Like other males in the genus Opisthoteuthis, these specimens had some enlarged suckers on their arms. Unlike their sister taxa, however, O. robsoni males have enlarged suckers in the proximal field rather than the distal field (enlarged suckers closer to the body rather than toward the tip of the arm).
