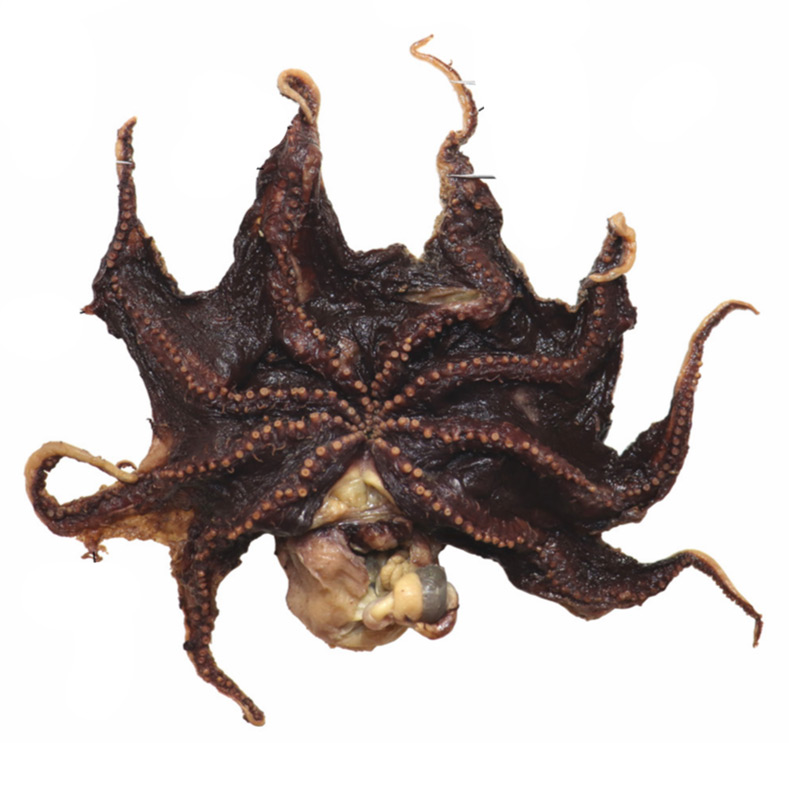

Scientific classification
- Kingdom: Animalia
- Phylum: Mollusca
- Class: Cephalopoda
- Order: Octopoda
- Family: Opisthoteuthidae
- Genus: Opisthoteuthis
- Species: O. carnarvonensis

Binomial name
- Opisthoteuthis carnarvonensis Verhoeff, 2025

= Opisthoteuthis carnarvonensis =

Species of umbrella octopus

Opisthoteuthis carnarvonensis, also known as the Carnarvon flapjack octopus, is a species of umbrella octopus in the family Opisthoteuthidae.

The type specimen was collected by scientists during a CSIRO voyage, on the RV Investigator, in late 2022 at the Carnarvon Canyon Marine Park. The species was formally described in May 2025.
