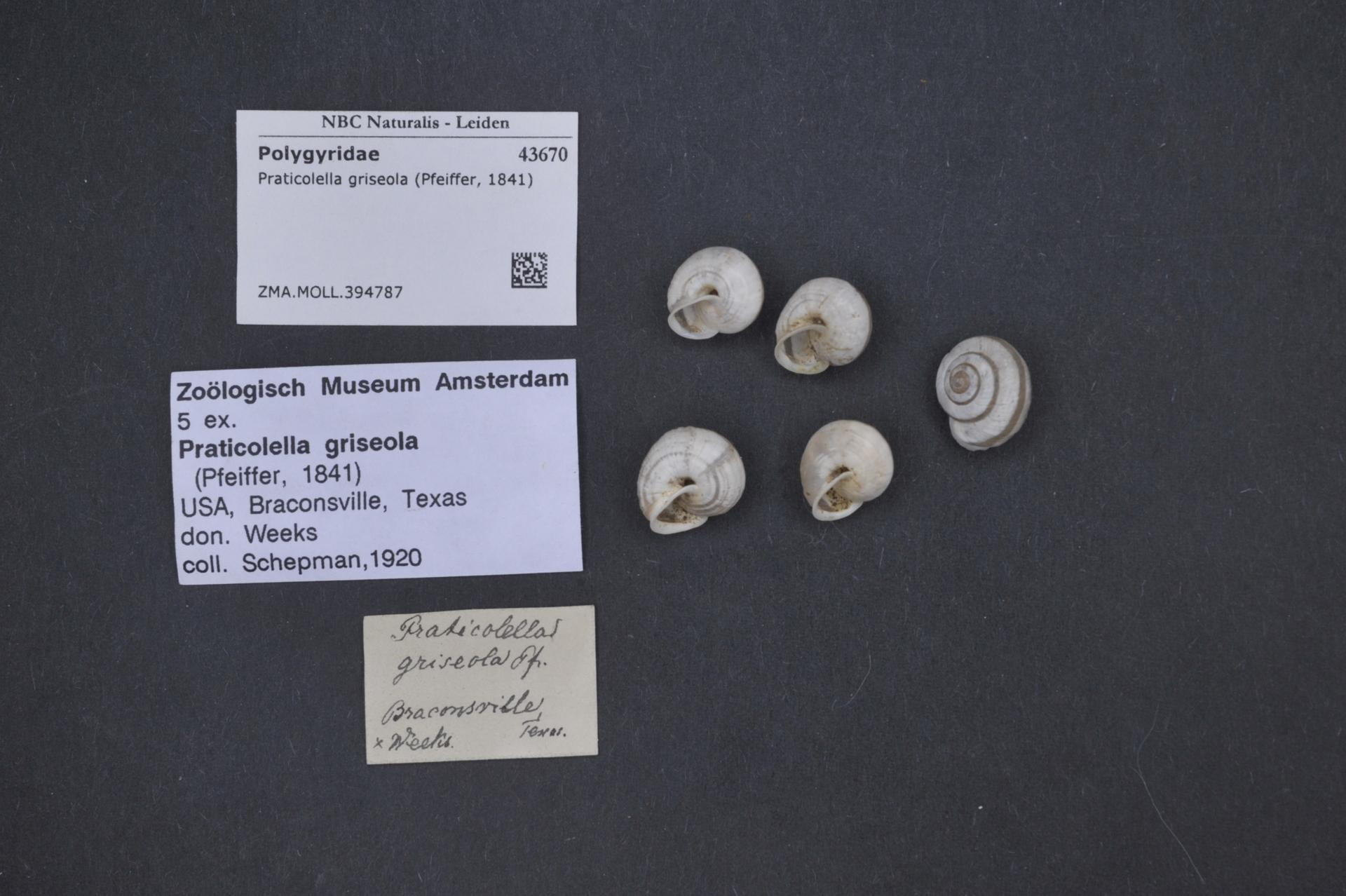
- Praticolella griseola shells

Scientific classification
- Kingdom: Animalia
- Phylum: Mollusca
- Class: Gastropoda
- Order: Stylommatophora
- Family: Polygyridae
- Genus: Praticolella
- Species: P. griseola

Binomial name
- Praticolella griseola (Pfeiffer, 1841)

= Praticolella griseola =

Species of gastropod

Praticolella griseola is a species of land snail, a terrestrial gastropod mollusc in the family Polygyridae.

== Distribution ==
The distribution of Praticolella griseola includes Cuba and Costa Rica.

The non-indigenous distribution of Praticolella griseola includes Martinique.

== Ecology ==
Praticolella griseola is a tree dwelling species.

Predators of Praticolella griseola include larvae of the firefly Alecton discoidalis.
