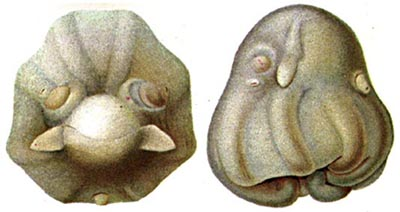
- 1915 drawing of O. medusoides

Conservation status
- Data Deficient (IUCN 3.1)

Scientific classification
- Kingdom: Animalia
- Phylum: Mollusca
- Class: Cephalopoda
- Order: Octopoda
- Family: Opisthoteuthidae
- Genus: Opisthoteuthis
- Species: O. medusoides

Binomial name
- Opisthoteuthis medusoides Thiele, 1915

= Opisthoteuthis medusoides =

Species of mollusc

Opisthoteuthis medusoides is a cirrate octopus living off the coast of Tanzania near Dar es Salaam. However, its actual range may be more extensive.

The octopus lives 400 m (1,300 ft) deep, where it occupies the benthic zone, or seafloor.

The species is known from only two juvenile octopuses. Both had little pigment. Because of the octopus' medusoid (jellyfish-like) body shape, the species was given the name medusoides. Male opisthoteuthids generally have enlarged suckers on multiple arms; O. medusoides is different, having enlarged suckers on only one arm. "A redescription of this species is badly needed," write Richard E. Young and Michael Vecchione, both scientists who research cephalopods.
