= Opisthoteuthis massyae =

Conservation status
- Vulnerable (IUCN 3.1)

Scientific classification
- Kingdom: Animalia
- Phylum: Mollusca
- Class: Cephalopoda
- Order: Octopoda
- Family: Opisthoteuthidae
- Genus: Opisthoteuthis
- Species: O. massyae

Binomial name
- Opisthoteuthis massyae Grimpe, 1920

Synonyms
- Cirroteuthis massyae Grimpe, 1920; Cirroteuthopsis massyae Grimpe, 1920; Opisthoteuthis vossi Sanchez and Guerra, 1989; Cirroteuthis massyae Grimpe, 1920

Species of mollusc

Opisthoteuthis massyae is an octopus living in the eastern Atlantic Ocean.

O. massyae occupies the benthic zone (seafloor and water immediately above) of the open ocean. The octopus lives from 600 m (2,000 ft) to 1,500 m (4,900 ft) deep. It's found as far north as Ireland, in the Rockall Basin, and as far south as Namibia. There are more specimens in the southeast Atlantic than in the northeast Atlantic.

The two foremost arms of mature males are thicker than their other six arms. This is unusual for Opisthoteuthis species. Mature males also have some enlarged suckers, which is more typical of the genus. Males have more suckers than females. Specimens with longer arms generally have more suckers. Males weigh more than females; males can reach a weight of 5,750 g (12.68 lb), and females a weight of 2,959 g (6.523 lb). Females may lay eggs throughout their lifetimes.

O. massyae has the ability to invert or "balloon" their webs. (Note: See the external links section for photographs of this behavior.) O. massyae is a carnivore; it probably catches prey by enveloping small animals within its web, similar to some other cirrate octopods. It eats a variety of small prey: gammarid amphipods, polychaetes, decapods, opossum shrimp, copepods, isopods, tanaids, marine snails, marine slugs, and bivalves.

Although O. massyae isn't used commercially, it's often taken as bycatch by commercial fishing vessels. This threatens its population.
