= Opisthoteuthis calypso =

Flapjack octopus

Conservation status
- Vulnerable (IUCN 3.1)

Scientific classification
- Kingdom: Animalia
- Phylum: Mollusca
- Class: Cephalopoda
- Order: Octopoda
- Family: Opisthoteuthidae
- Genus: Opisthoteuthis
- Species: O. calypso

Binomial name
- Opisthoteuthis calypso Villanueva, Collins, Sánchez & Voss, 2002

Species of octopus

Opisthoteuthis calypso or calypso flapjack octopus is a species of genus Opisthoteuthis, which are known as the cirrate octopuses. Octopuses in this genus are known as the flapjack octopuses and can be found in a variety of oceans across the world.

== Anatomy and morphology ==
The species of this genus show distinctive characteristics among the class Cephalopoda, including an oval shaped body compressed along the longitudinal axis, a gelatinous consistence and a large interbarachil web.

This species generally has a mantle length of 5 cm. This web is what has given them their common name "flapjack" or "pancake devil fish". Other distinctive features include the presence of two small fins on the mantle, an internal U-shaped shell that has a groove along its outer surface. This particular species has eight, subequal arms (of an uneven length). As adults, they tend to have 47–58 suckers on each of these eight arms. Their cirri (small tassel-like appendages on the surface of the octopus) are on the shorter end, with a length reaching up to 5 mm. This is what differs them from other members of the Opisthoteuthis genus. Due to the delicate consistency of the species, captured specimen are often in poor condition and therefore near impossible to identify other particular distinguishing features.

== Distribution and habitat ==
This species is typically found in the South Eastern Atlantic Ocean and Mediterranean Sea, although they are quite rare and therefore distribution is not well known. In terms of habitat, the species has been found on muddy bottoms at depths of 365 meters in the South East Atlantic and 2208 meters in the Mediterranean. Recent studies have found 11 specimens around the Balearic Islands in the western Mediterranean, and others 38 others have been found at depths ranging from 871 to 1420 meters in the Sardinian Channel of the central Western Mediterranean. This species was previously mistaken for O. agassizi, a species in the same genus. Since, previous captured specimen of O. agassizi, that were found in the Mediterranean have been accredited to O. calypso, and is now believed to be the sole Opisthoteuthis species in the area.

== Life history ==
Adult males are larger than females, with a total length of 482 mm and a weight of 5400 grams, while the females have a total length of 342 mm and a weight of 1650 g. Females of the Opisthoteuthis calypso have been shown to have ovarian oocyte size frequency which is akin to species that show continuous egg production and release, alluding to a continuous-spawning reproductive pattern. This contrasts with the semelparity shown in a majority of incirrate octopuses.

== Behavior ==
The prey of Opisthoteuthis calypso includes small organisms with slow swim speeds. The most important prey items for Opisthoteuthis calypso include benthic gammarid, amphipods, and polychaetes of the epibenthic fauna (those which live on or just above the bottom sediments).

In samples taken from the Sardinian Channel, Polychaeta and Crustacea made up around 40% and 36% of the total stomach contents respectively. Sand was also found in the stomachs of all samples which alludes to further evidence of their hunting behavior taking place in epibenthic zones. A detailed analysis feeding of relative species O. agassizi at 490 meters have shown a pattern of continuous feeding and is believed to be true for Opisthoteuthis calypso as well. Visually oriented species such as this, who are living at greater depths show a decrease in energy expenditure rates as the depth increases. This decrease in energy usage is attributed to the reduction in locomotion needed with the visually instigated predator-prey relationship in the light-limited habitat they live in.

== Threatened species ==
This species of Opisthoteuthis is found to be on the vulnerable stage of the IUCN Red List of Threatened Species as of 2014. This species has been accessed as vulnerable because of impacts by the commercial fishing market as bycatch. Similar congeneric species with a similar biology to Opisthoteuthis calypso has been shown to decline by 30% over three generations due to similar reasoning.
