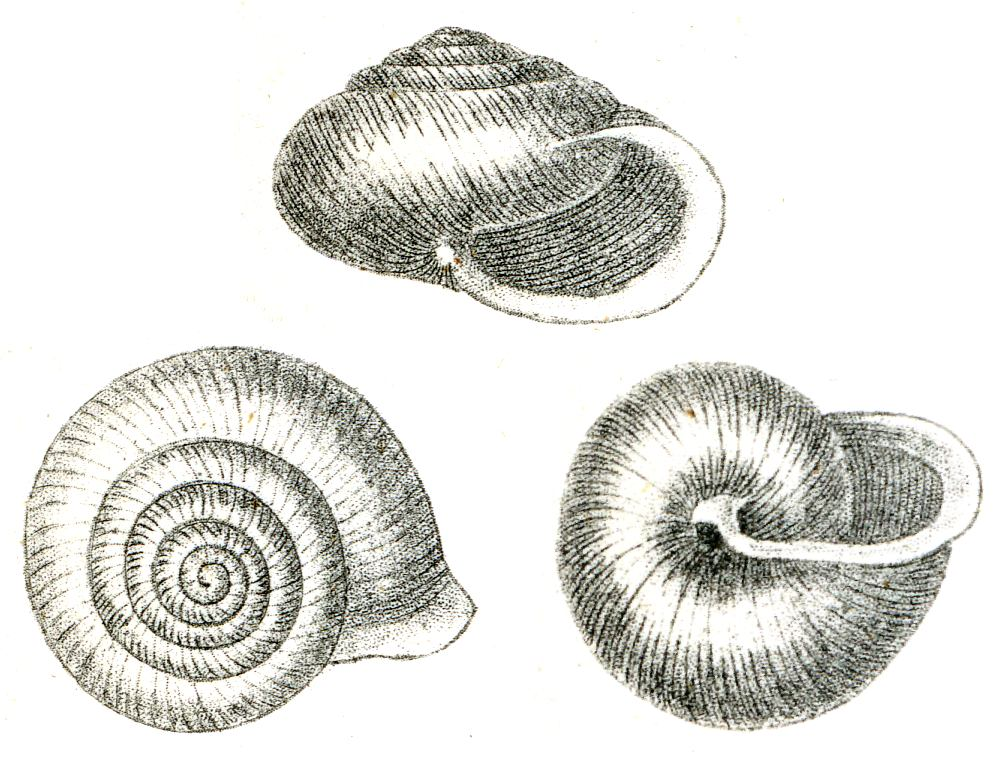
- Three views of a shell of Vespericola columbiana from W. G. Binney, 1878

Conservation status
- Secure (NatureServe)

Scientific classification
- Kingdom: Animalia
- Phylum: Mollusca
- Class: Gastropoda
- Order: Stylommatophora
- Family: Polygyridae
- Genus: Vespericola
- Species: V. columbiana

Binomial name
- Vespericola columbiana (I. Lea, 1838)

= Vespericola columbiana =

Species of gastropod

Vespericola columbiana, common name the northwest hesperian, is a species of air-breathing land snail, a terrestrial pulmonate gastropod mollusc in the family Polygyridae.

== Subspecies ==
- Vespericola columbiana depressa (Pilsbry & Henderson, 1936)
- Vespericola columbiana latilabrum Pilsbry, 1940
