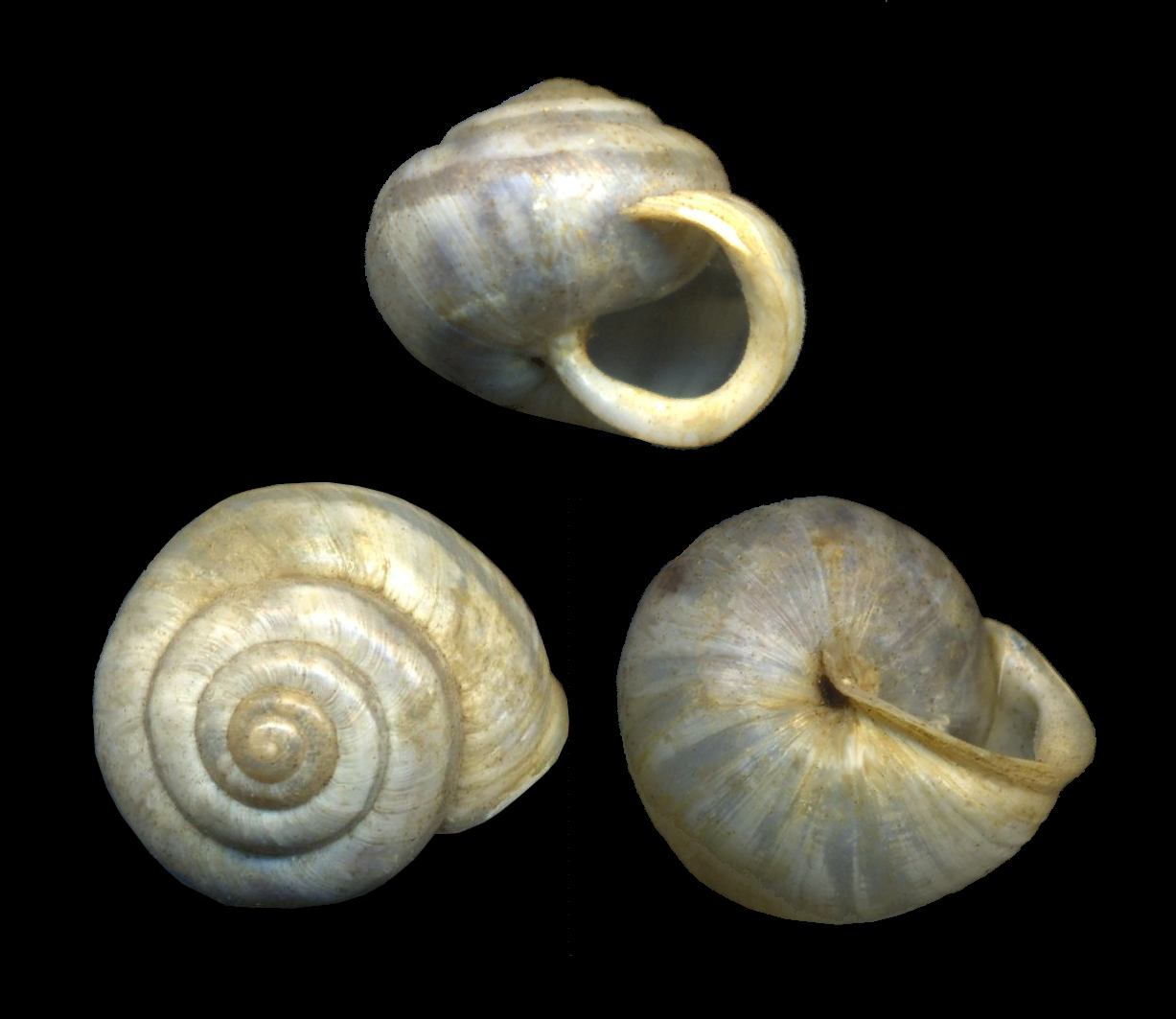
- Three views of a shell of Praticolella berlandieriana

Scientific classification
- Kingdom: Animalia
- Phylum: Mollusca
- Class: Gastropoda
- Order: Stylommatophora
- Family: Polygyridae
- Subfamily: Polygyrinae
- Genus: Praticolella von Martens, 1892

= Praticolella =

Genus of gastropods

Praticolella is a genus of air-breathing land snails, terrestrial pulmonate gastropod molluscs in the family Polygyridae.

This genus comprises about 15 species of small snails with semi-globose shells.

== Shell description ==
The shells of these snails often have contrasting color bands, and are usually without apertural teeth, although a tooth may sometimes occur on the parietal wall of the aperture.

Snails in this genus are distinguished from other polygyrid snails on the basis of their internal anatomy.

== Distribution ==
Species of Praticolella may be found from Nicaragua and eastern Mexico, into the southeastern United States, from Texas to North Carolina.

== Species ==
This genus includes the following species and subspecies:

- Praticolella ampla (Pfeiffer, 1866)
- Praticolella bakeri Vanatta, 1915
- Praticolella berlandieriana (Moricand, 1833)
- Praticolella campi Clapp & Ferriss, 1919
- Praticolella candida Hubricht, 1983
- Praticolella griseola (Pfeiffer, 1841)
- Praticolella jejuna (Say, 1821)
- Praticolella lawae (Lewis, 1874)
- Praticolella martensiana (Pilsbry, 1907)
- Praticolella mobiliana (Lea, 1841)
- Praticolella pachyloma (Menke, 1847)
- Praticolella strebeliana Pilsbry, 1899
- Praticolella taeniata Pilsbry, 1940
- Praticolella trimatris Hubricht, 1983
