= Opisthoteuthis dongshaensis =

Conservation status
- Data Deficient (IUCN 3.1)

Scientific classification
- Kingdom: Animalia
- Phylum: Mollusca
- Class: Cephalopoda
- Order: Octopoda
- Family: Opisthoteuthidae
- Genus: Opisthoteuthis
- Species: O. dongshaensis

Binomial name
- Opisthoteuthis dongshaensis C.C. Lu, 2010

Species of mollusc

Opisthoteuthis dongshaensis is a species of octopus located in the South China Sea.

== Name and habitat ==
The type specimens, the animals used to formally describe the species, were found off Pratas Island. This is also known as Dong Sha Island, hence the species name. In Chinese (transliterated to the Latin alphabet), O. dongshaensis is called Dongsha-Miàn-Xiāo.

The species is only known from waters near Dong Sha Island. O. dongshaensis lives 660–1,015 m (2,165–3,330 ft) deep. O. dongshaensis occupies the benthic zone, living on or near the seafloor. It may be threatened by fishing in the area; however, further research is still needed.

The type specimens of the species are held by the National Museum of Natural Science in Taichung, Taiwan.

== Anatomy ==
O. dongshaensis is small and has a roughly bell-shaped body. The males, like many other octopuses in the genus Opisthoteuthis, have some enlarged suckers. Males have oversized suckers in the distal field (at the ends of the arms; far from the body). These enlarged suckers only exist on some arms, while other arms have small suckers throughout. Females have proportionally smaller suckers than males; however, females have more suckers on average.

These octopuses have wide heads and large eyes. They also have large fins to aid in movement. The fins are long when compared to those of other cirrate octopus species. Thick, fleshy webs connect their arms, creating the distinctive "umbrella" shape. The arms may be of different lengths.
