= Eric Hochberg (biologist) =

Marine biologist

Frederick George "Eric" Hochberg (1941–2023) was a marine biologist and taxonomist specializing in the study of cephalopods and their parasites. He died 31 May 2023 after a long illness.

Hochberg earned both his undergraduate degree (1965) and his doctorate in zoology (conferred 1971) from the University of California, Santa Barbara, later taking on teaching positions at the University of Washington. He became a curator at the Santa Barbara Museum of Natural History in 1973. Hochberg co-founded and served as president of the Cephalopod International Advisory Council (CIAC), an organization of scientists that provides advice on cephalopod-related issues to governments and fisheries. In 1999, Hochberg was appointed to the California Squid Scientific Research Committee to help oversee California’s squid fishery.

Through the late 1970s and into the 2000s Hochberg described 30 species and seven new genera. Notably, he collaborated on the description of several species of octopus, including Thaumoctopus mimicus (mimic octopus) and Wunderpus photogenicus (the wunderpus). Hochberg was also well known for his extensive research on cephalopod parasites, describing many species of dicyemids, and he also studied terrestrial mollusks.

== Species and genera named after F.G. ("Eric") Hochberg ==
- Cirroctopus hochbergi O'Shea, 1999 (Octopus)
- Genus Hochbergellus Roth & Miller, 1992 (land snail genus)
- Stellicola hochbergi López-González & Pascual, 1996 (Copepod)

== Species named by Hochberg ==
- Dicyemennea discocephala Hochberg & Short, 1983
- Helminthoglypta concolor Roth & Hochberg, 1988
- Helminthoglypta uvasana Roth & Hochberg, 1992
- Helminthoglypta vasquezi Roth & Hochberg, 1992
- Microeledone mangoldi Norman, Hochberg & Boucher-Rodoni, 2004
- Thaumoctopus mimicus Norman & Hochberg, 2005
- Wunderpus photogenicus Hochberg, Norman & Finn, 2006
