= Opisthoteuthis japonica =

Conservation status
- Data Deficient (IUCN 3.1)

Scientific classification
- Kingdom: Animalia
- Phylum: Mollusca
- Class: Cephalopoda
- Order: Octopoda
- Family: Opisthoteuthidae
- Genus: Opisthoteuthis
- Species: O. japonica

Binomial name
- Opisthoteuthis japonica Taki, 1962

Species of octopus

Opisthoteuthis japonica is a species of octopus that lives in the Pacific Ocean near Japan. Its mantle is about 45 millimeters long, and it's been found at 152 meters deep. O. japonica lives in the neritic zone.
