= S. Stillman Berry =

American zoologist

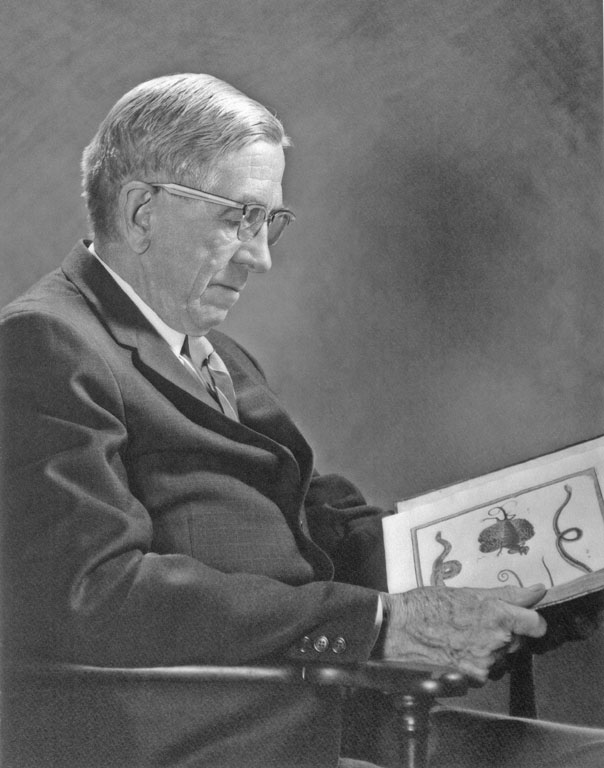
- Berry with a rare book from his collection, c. 1960s
- Born: March 16, 1887; Unity, Maine, United States
- Died: April 9, 1984 (aged 97); Winnecook ranch, near Harlowton, Montana
- Education: Stanford University (B.S., Ph.D.), Harvard (M.S.)
- Known for: Work on cephalopods
- Father: Ralph Berry
- Scientific career
- Fields: Marine zoology
- Author abbrev. (zoology): Berry

Samuel Stillman Berry (March 16, 1887 – April 9, 1984) was an American marine zoologist who specialized in cephalopods.

== Early life ==
Berry was born in Unity, Maine, but the family home was the Winnecook Ranch in Montana, which had been founded by his father Ralph in 1880. In 1897, he moved with his mother, Evelyn Crie Berry, to Redlands, California.

Berry received a B.S. (1909) from Stanford and his M.S. (1910) from Harvard. He then returned to Stanford for his Ph.D. work on cephalopods and got his doctorate in 1913.

== Career ==
From 1913 until 1915, he worked as a librarian and research assistant at the Scripps Institution for Biological Research in La Jolla, California. This was the last paid employment he ever held in academia—all his later studies and expeditions were financed by the profits from the family ranch in Montana.

From November 1946 to December 1969, Berry published his own journal, Leaflets in Malacology, which primary contained articles which he had written himself.

Despite his independent status, he became a renowned malacologist, publishing 209 articles and establishing 401 mollusc taxa. His scientific publications dealt with chitons, cephalopods, and land snails. Forty-seven of his published papers were about cephalopods.

Berry also had an interest in horticulture, where he concentrated on the hybridization of irises and daffodils. For some time, from the 1920s until the late 1940s, he ran a horticultural business from Winnecook Ranch, which he had taken over after the death of his father in 1911. In 1917 he became the president of the Winnecook Ranch Company, a post he occupied until his death in 1984.

== Works ==
- "Cephalopods of the genera Sepioloidea, Sepiadorium, and Idiosepius". Philippine Journal of Science. 1: 347–364. 1932 – via Biodiversity Heritage Library.
- "The cephalopoda of the Hawaiian islands". Bulletin of the Bureau of Fisheries. 32: 257–362. 1912 – via Google Books.
- Berry, S. Stillman (2016). "A New Sierran Pulmonate of the Genus Monadenia". Bulletin of the Southern California Academy of Sciences. 54 (1).

== See also ==
- Category:Taxa named by S. Stillman Berry
