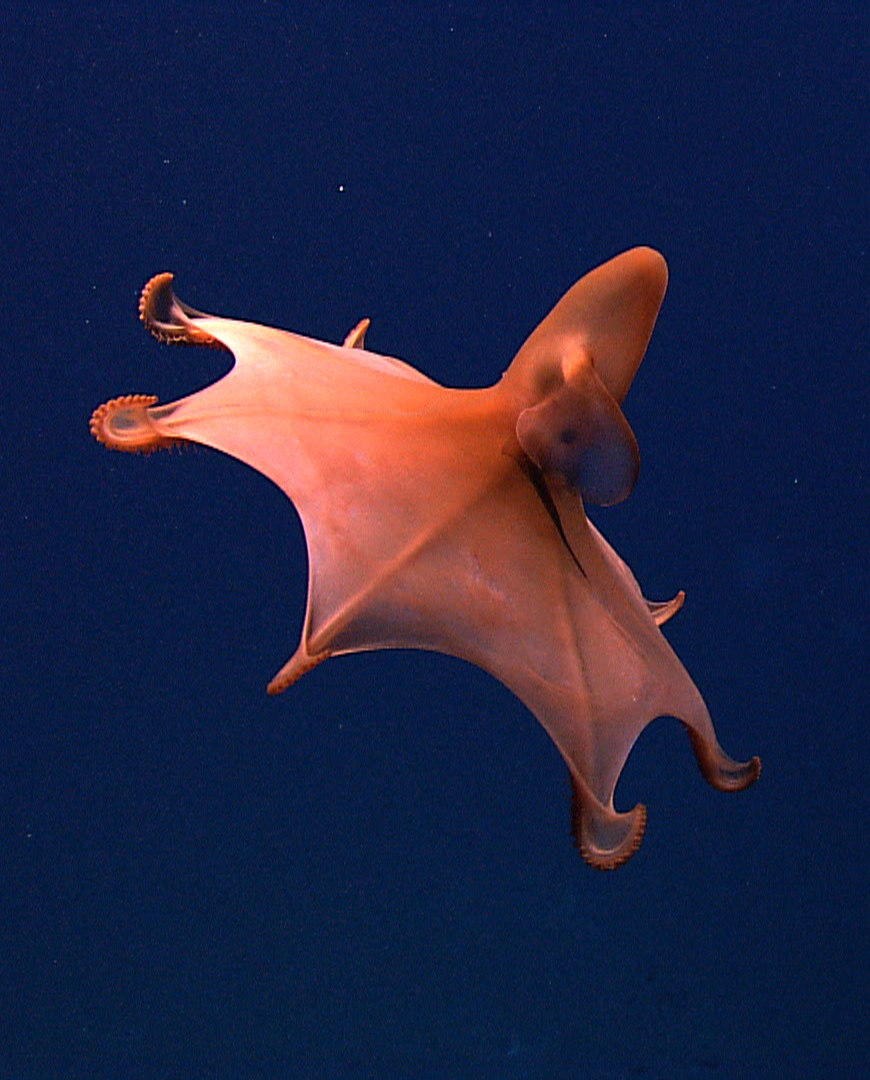
- Cirrothauma murrayi, a cirrate octopus, found off the coast of Puerto Rico

Scientific classification
- Kingdom: Animalia
- Phylum: Mollusca
- Class: Cephalopoda
- Order: Octopoda
- Suborder: Cirrina; Grimpe, 1916 sensu Felley et al., 2001

Families
- Opisthoteuthidae; Grimpoteuthidae; Cirroteuthidae; Stauroteuthidae; Cirroctopodidae

Synonyms
- Cirrata Grimpe, 1916; Cirroctopoda Young, 1989

= Cirrina =

Cirrina Temporal range: Cenomanian–present

Suborder of octopuses

Cirrina or Cirrata is a suborder and one of the two main divisions of octopuses. Cirrate octopuses have a small, internal shell and two fins on their head, while their sister suborder Incirrina has neither. The fins of cirrate octopods are associated with a unique cartilage-like shell in a shell sac. In cross-section, the fins have distinct proximal and distal regions, both of which are covered by a thin surface sheath of muscle.

The suborder is named for small, cilia-like strands (cirri) on the arms of the octopus, a pair for each sucker. These are thought to play some role in feeding, perhaps by creating currents of water that help bring food closer to the beak. Cirrate octopuses are noteworthy for lacking ink sacs, having reduced or absent radula, and reduced gills.

The oldest known member of the group is Nanaimoteuthis, including the giant N. haggarti (estimated total length potentially between 6.6 and 18.6 metres (22 and 61 ft)), from the Late Cretaceous of Japan and Canada.

There is not much data about cirrate octopods due to their fragility, which makes them particularly prone to becoming damaged when captured for sampling.

== Phylogeny ==
A molecular phylogeny based on mitochondrial and nuclear DNA marker sequences by Sanchez et al., 2018, shows that the Cirrina is paraphyletic, i.e. it is not a single clade. Instead, a clade containing Opisthoteuthidae and Cirroctopodidae is sister to the Octopodida, while a clade containing Cirroteuthidae and Stauroteuthidae is sister to the clade that contains those other groups. However, subsequent studies, using a greater coverage of species and genes, have found Cirrata and Incirrata to be monophyletic clades, consistent with earlier morphological and molecular studies.

== Locomotion and feeding ==
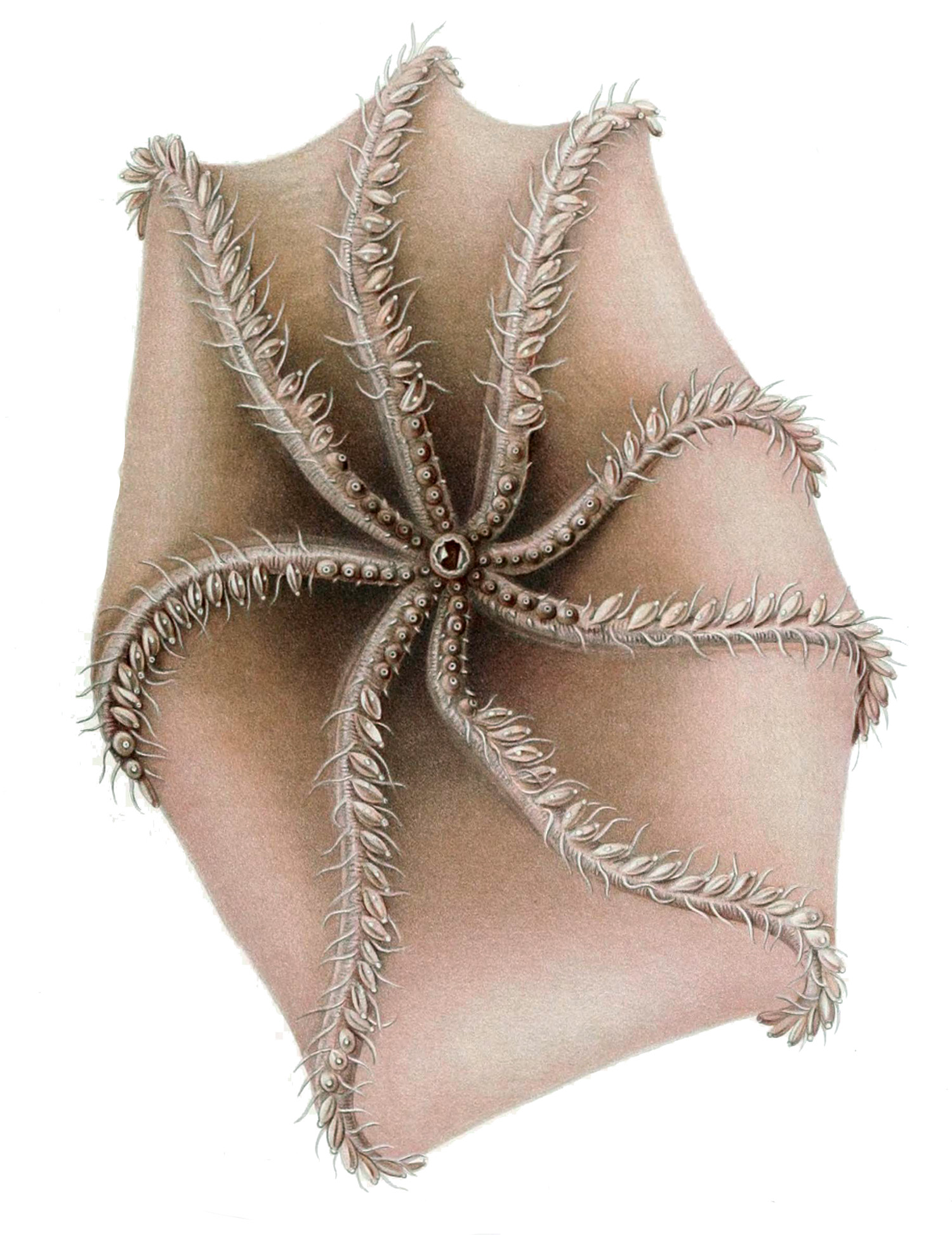
Oral view of Cirrothauma murrayi showing single row of suckers and paired cirri

Cirrina octopods swim by a combination of fin action and medusoid propulsion. This mode of locomotion differs from other octopods that primarily rely on jet propulsion, which is less effective in cirrates. In cross-section, the fins have distinct proximal and distal regions, both covered by a thin muscle sheath. The distal region has dorsal and ventral muscle layers similar to those in decapod fins. In the proximal region, the fin cartilage forms a flat central core, providing skeletal support for muscle attachment. Limited data on the stomach contents of cirrate octopods indicate a diet primarily consisting of Crustacea and Polychaeta.

The cirri, relatively long in Cirroteuthis with reduced musculature, may be used to scan seafloor for prey during feeding and to capture prey. Reports on Stauroteuthis syrtensis suggest it consumes copepods and employs a hunting strategy that involves trapping prey in a muccous web produced by buccal secretory glands.

== Reproduction ==
It is currently unknown how long female cirrate octopus are able to retain sperm. It is believed that female cirrina octopods produce eggs for the majority of their lifespan. Based on captured samples, scientists have been able to determine that female cirrina store a large amount of eggs, which vary in size and developmental stages. They release mature eggs one or two at a time, with the pre-mature eggs remaining attached to the ovary by a follicular sheath.

Cirrate octopods produce eggs which are different from Incirrates. For example, dumbo octopuses (Grimpoteuthis) lay their eggs one at a time. According to Ziegler, there are not enough egg specimens to draw conclusions about cirrate octopod development. Currently, microscopical data gathered from egg specimens are only enough to support inferences. It is believed that the eggs of species found in the mesopelagic and bathypelagic zones are substantially different from eggs of species found in the epipelagic and bathypelagic zones.

== Classification ==
The family level clades recognized within Cirrina has changed over time. Currently five families are recognized by the World Register of Marine Species allocated to two superfamily level clades, Superfamily Cirroteuthoidea (Cirroteuthidae, Stauroteuthidae) and Superfamily Opisthoteuthoidea (Opisthoteuthidae, Grimpoteuthidae, and Cirroctopodidae), with these groups also recognized in recent molecular work.

The family Opisthoteuthidae are primarily found in benthic regions of the sea, whereas Grimpoteuthidae and Cirroctopodidae reside in the benthopelagic regions. Lastly, the Cirroteuthidae family can be found in the pelagic region near the seafloor.

The families Cirroteuthidae and Stauroteuthidae have been problematic, while they are distinct morphologically, molecular studies using mitochondrial genes revealed a single family (Stauroteuthidae being synonymized under Cirroteuthidae), but more recent analysis using nuclear genes does show separation. The family Grimpoteuthidae has also at times been synonymized under Opisthoteuthidae but is currently well supported.

- Class Cephalopoda
  - Subclass Nautiloidea: nautilus
  - Subclass †Ammonoidea: ammonites
  - Subclass Coleoidea
    - Superorder Decapodiformes: squid, cuttlefish
    - Superorder Octopodiformes (a.k.a., Octobrachia)
      - Family †Trachyteuthididae (incertae sedis)
      - Order Vampyromorphida: vampire squid
      - Order Octopoda
        - Genus †Keuppia (incertae sedis)
        - Genus †Palaeoctopus (incertae sedis)
        - Genus †Proteroctopus (incertae sedis)
        - Genus †Styletoctopus (incertae sedis)
        - Suborder Cirrina: finned deep-sea octopus
          - Superfamily Opisthoteuthoidea
            - Family Opisthoteuthidae (containing Opisthoteuthis, Exsuperoteuthis & Insigniteuthis)
            - Family Grimpoteuthidae (containing Grimpoteuthis, Cryptoteuthis, & Luteuthis)
            - Family Cirroctopodidae (containing Cirroctopus)
          - Superfamily Cirroteuthoidea
            - Family Cirroteuthidae (containing Cirroteuthis, Cirrothauma, & Inopinoteuthis)
            - Family Stauroteuthidae (containing Stauroteuthis)
          - Family & Superfamily uncertain: †Nanaimoteuthis
        - Suborder Incirrina: octopus without mantle fins or cirri.
