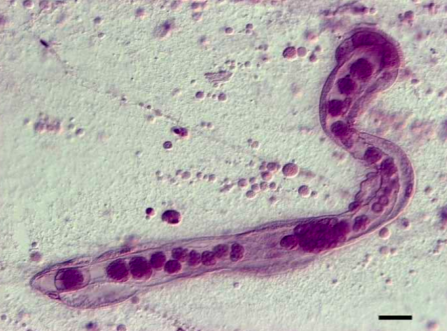
- Dicyema japonicum

Scientific classification
- Kingdom: Animalia
- Phylum: Dicyemida
- Class: Rhombozoa
- Family: Dicyemidae
- Genus: Dicyema von Kölliker, 1849

= Dicyema =

Genus of rhombozoa animals

Dicyema is a genus of worms belonging to the family Dicyemidae.

Species:

- Dicyema acciaccatum McConnaughey, 1949
- Dicyema acheroni McConnaughey, 1949
- Dicyema acuticephalum Nouvel, 1947 - parasitizes Octopus vulgaris
- Dicyema aegira McConnaughey & Kritzler, 1952
- Dicyema akashiense Furuya, 2005
- Dicyema apalachiensis Short, 1962
- Dicyema apollyoni Nouvel, 1947
- Dicyema australis Penchaszadeh, 1969
- Dicyema awajiense Furuya, 2005
- Dicyema balanocephalum Furuya, 2006
- Dicyema banyulensis Furuya & Hochberg, 1999
- Dicyema benedeni Furuya & Hochberg, 1999
- Dicyema benthoctopi Hochberg & Short, 1970
- Dicyema bilobum Couch & Short, 1964
- Dicyema briarei Short, 1961
- Dicyema caudatum Bogolepova-Dobrokhotova, 1960
- Dicyema clavatum Furuya & Koshida, 1992 - parasitizes Octopus minor
- Dicyema colurum Furuya, 1999 - parasitizes Octopus fangsiao
- Dicyema dolichocephalum Furuya, 1999 - parasitizes Octopus minor
- Dicyema erythrum Furuya, 1999 - parasitizes Octopus fangsiao
- Dicyema ganapatii Kalavati, Narasimhamurti & Suseela, 1984
- Dicyema hadrum Furuya, 1999 - parasitizes Sepia esculenta
- Dicyema helocephalum Furuya, 2005
- Dicyema hypercephalum Short, 1962
- Dicyema irinoense Furuya, 2005
- Dicyema japonicum Furuya & Tsuneki, 1992 - parasitizes Octopus vulgaris
- Dicyema knoxi Short, 1971
- Dicyema koshidai Furuya & Tsuneki, 2005
- Dicyema leiocephalum Furuya, 2006
- Dicyema lycidoeceum Furuya, 1999 - parasitizes Sepia lycidas
- Dicyema macrocephalum (van Beneden, 1876)
- Dicyema madrasensis Kalavati, Narasimhamurti & Suseela, 1984
- Dicyema maorum Short, 1971
- Dicyema megalocephalum Nouvel, 1934
- Dicyema microcephalum Whitman, 1883
- Dicyema misakiense Nouvel & Nakao, 1938 - parasitizes Octopus vulgaris
- Dicyema monodi Nouvel, 1934
- Dicyema moschatum Whitman, 1883
- Dicyema nouveli Kalavati, Narasimhamurti & Suseela, 1984
- Dicyema octopusi Kalavati, Narasimhamurti & Suseela, 1984
- Dicyema oligomerum Bogolepova-Dobrokhotova, 1960
- Dicyema orientale Nouvel & Nakao, 1938 - parasitizes Sepioteuthis lessoniana
- Dicyema oxycephalum Furuya, 2009
- Dicyema paradoxum von Kölliker, 1849
- Dicyema platycephalum Penchaszadeh, 1968
- Dicyema rhadinum Furuya, 1999 - parasitizes Sepia esculenta
- Dicyema robsonellae Short, 1971
- Dicyema rondeletiolae Nouvel, 1944
- Dicyema schulzianum (van Beneden, 1876)
- Dicyema sepiellae Furuya, 2008
- Dicyema shimantoense Furuya, 2008 - parasitizes Octopus sasakii
- Dicyema shorti Furuya, Damian & Hochberg, 2002
- Dicyema sphaerocephalum Furuya, 2005
- Dicyema sphyrocephalum Furuya, 1999 - parasitizes Octopus minor
- Dicyema sullivani McConnaughey, 1949
- Dicyema tosaense Furuya, 2005
- Dicyema typoides Short, 1964
- Dicyema typus van Beneden, 1876
- Dicyema whitmani Furuya & Hochberg, 1999
