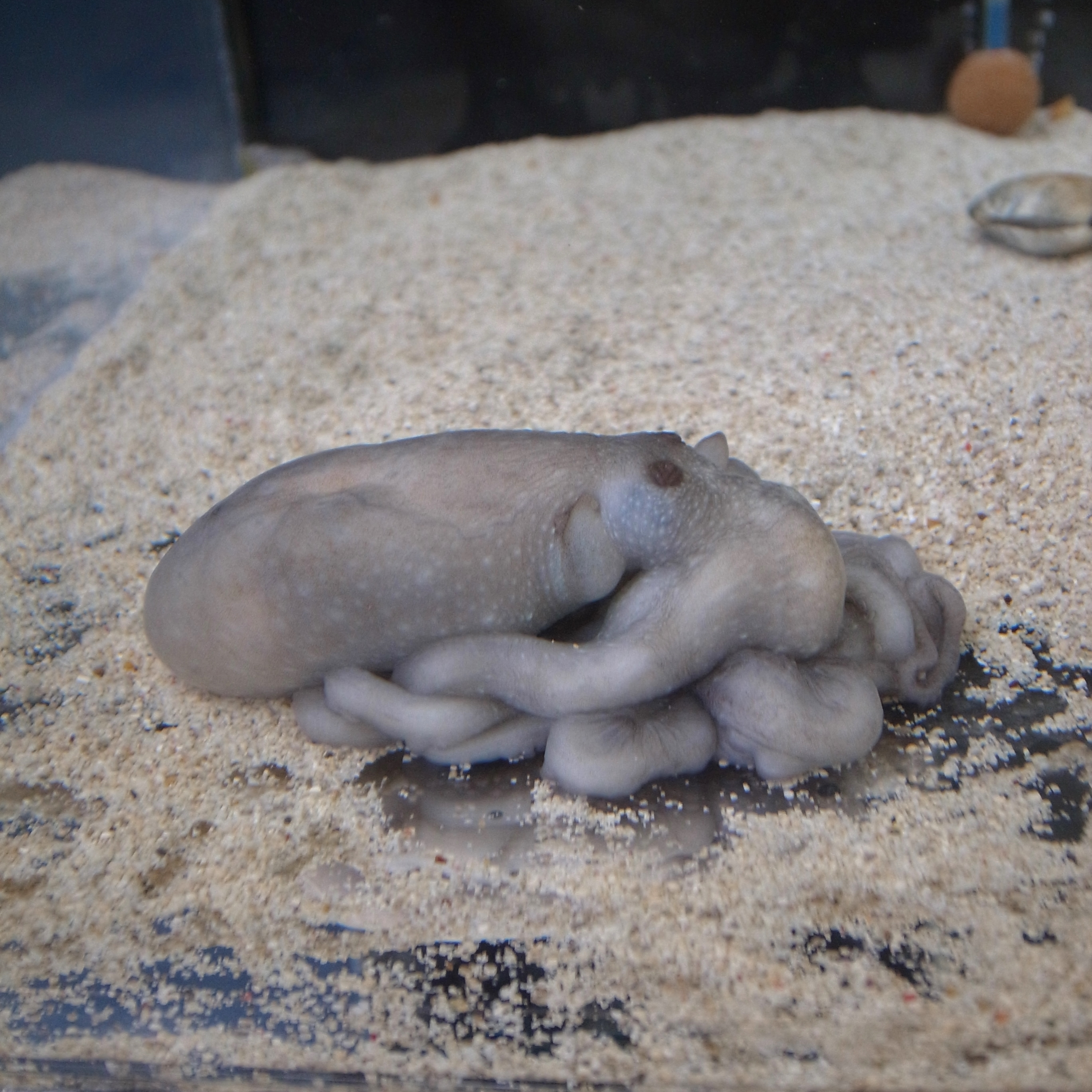

Conservation status
- Data Deficient (IUCN 3.1)

Scientific classification
- Kingdom: Animalia
- Phylum: Mollusca
- Class: Cephalopoda
- Order: Octopoda
- Family: Octopodidae
- Genus: Octopus
- Species: O. minor

Binomial name
- Octopus minor (Sasaki, 1920)

Synonyms
- Polypus macropus minor Sasaki, 1920 (basionym); Octopus minor minor (Sasaki, 1920); Polypus variabilis Sasaki, 1929; Polypus variabilis var. pardalis Sasaki, 1929; Polypus variabilis var. typicus Sasaki, 1929

= Octopus minor =

Species of cephalopod

Octopus minor, commonly known as the long arm octopus or the Korean common octopus, is a small-bodied octopus species distributed along the benthic coastal waters bordering China, Japan, and the Korean Peninsula. It lives at depths ranging from the sea surface to 200 metres (650 feet; 100 fathoms). O. minor is commonly found in the mudflats of sub-tidal zones where it is exposed to significant environmental variation. It is grouped within the class Cephalopoda along with squids and cuttlefish.

O. minor carries cultural and economic value in the countries in which it is found. It is important commercially to the fishing communities in Korea, where it is known as nakji, and contributes to the $35 million octopus industry. It is a Korean seafood, commonly referred to as nakji (Korean: 낙지). The octopus is served both cooked and raw, and is often a snack during sporting events.

There have been multiple findings concerning the physiological makeup of O. minor. It has been shown to host a dangerous parasite, while also demonstrating the ability to adapt its morphology to a wide range of environmental conditions. These characteristics have increased interest in the species and its genome has been mapped.

== Taxonomic status ==
This species was published as one subgroup of the species, Polypus macropus var. minor Sasaki, 1920 by Madoka Sasaki, Japanese Malacologist. Later, he moved it to another species, Polypus variabilis Sasaki, 1929 var. minor Sasaki, 1920, to distinguish it from P. macropus (=Callistoctopus macropus). In 1965, Iwao Taki transferred the name to Octopus minor (Sasaki, 1920). Sometimes referred as 'Octopus' minor, because genus Octopus is paraphyletic.

Kaneko et al. (2011) noted that O. minor is the member of genus Callistoctopus Taki, 1964 morphologically and phylogenetically based on mtDNA (COI and COIII); they subsequently renamed it into Callistoctopus minor (Sasaki, 1920). This relationship is supported by subsequent research teams in their own phylogenetic analyses. Several researchers still use the old name "Octopus minor", as the World Register of Marine Species still considers it a species of Octopus.

== Anatomy ==
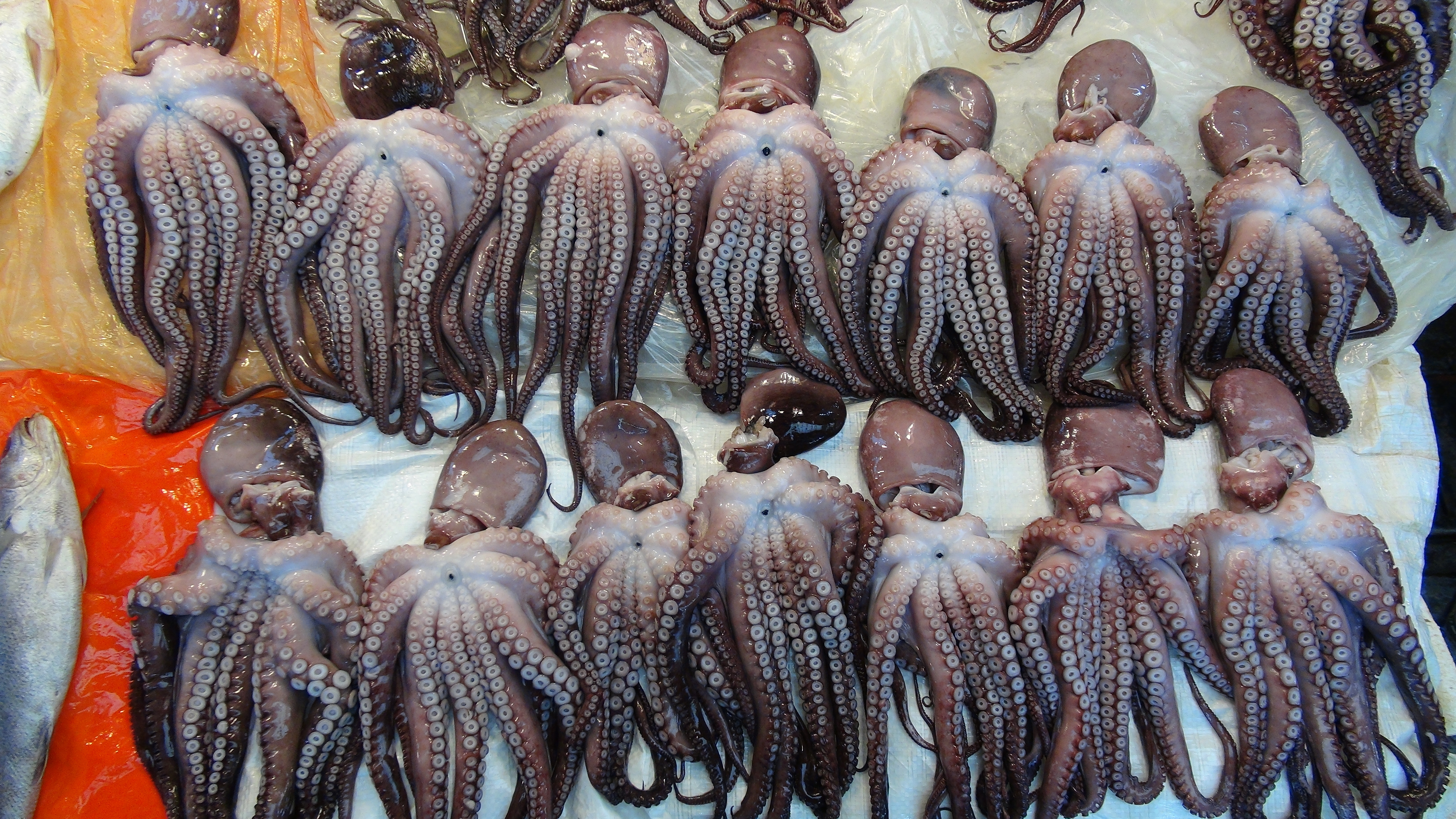
Nakji at a market in South Korea

O. minor, similar to the rest of its order Octopoda, is bilaterally symmetrical along a dorsoventral axis with two eyes and mouth surrounded by eight webbed arms. These arms contain two-thirds of the octopus's neurons. On the underside of these arms, O. minor has "suckers" which are circular, adhesive suction cups. These are predominantly used for manipulation, navigation, and for preparing food. O. minor has a bulbous mantle and visceral hump which contains the majority of its fundamental organs.

O. minor is small and soft-bodied with long arms, hence its nickname "long-arm octopus", or "whiparm octopus". Japanese common name is also "long-arm octopus" (テナガダコ, 手長蛸, tenaga-dako).

Their body surface is mostly smooth, with small pimples scattered on the dorsal surface. Live O. minor shows red-brown with light yellow spots on dorsal surfaces. It can be identified by its grey colouring which matches the sandy plains in which it is commonly found, however when it finds itself threatened or in danger, it will shift its coloration to a dark red.

Arms are thin and remarkably unequal in length. The first arm, the longest one, is about 80% of total length, which is twice length of third or fourth arms.

Funnel organ is VV-shaped.

Male has a hectocotylized arm to use for the mating. It is formed on right third arm, about half length of the left third arm. Ligula, the tip of the hectocotylized arm is large, spoon-shaped about 10–20% of the arm with about 42–48 suckers. Mature male also has enlarged suckers around level of 8th or 9th sucker pair, largest on the first arms.

=== Size ===
The O. minor reaches a mantle size of 18 centimetres (7 inches) with arms of up to 65 cm (25 1/2 in). It is on the smaller side of its class, compared to colossal squids which can reach lengths of over 10 metres (33 feet).

== Distribution and behaviour ==
=== Feeding ===
O. minor, like other octopus populations, possesses predatory traits. O. minor's diet coincides with that of other bottom-dwelling octopuses, with over 50% of its prey being fish, 25% by shellfish such as whelks and clams, the remainder being made up of crustaceans such as crabs, along with annelids and nematodes, other commonly found species sharing their habitat with O. minor. The smaller size of the octopus means rejection of larger species including rock scallops and large fish.

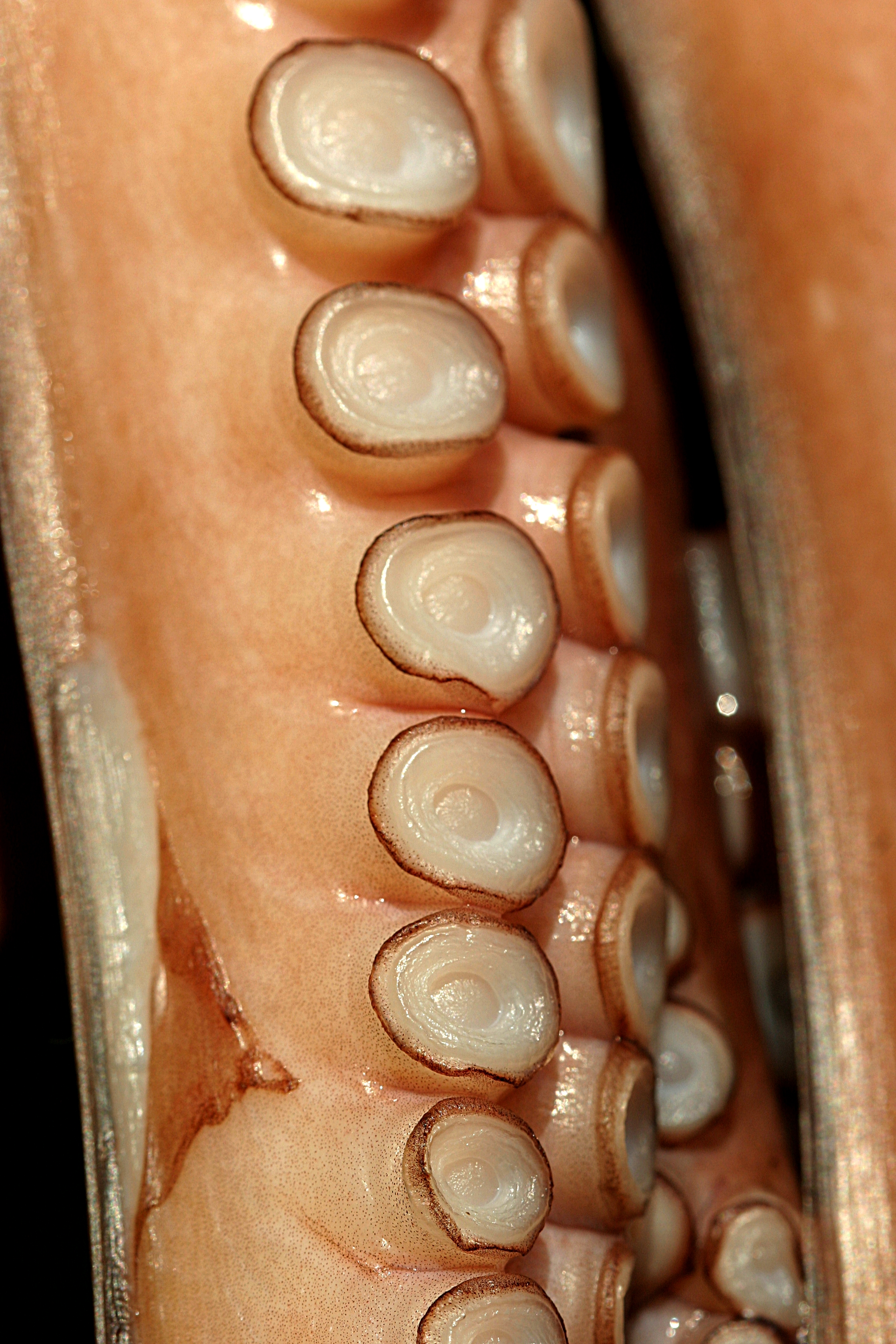
Octopus "suckers"

The benthic nature of O. minor allows it to move between rocks and through crevices. Once it has identified its prey, it makes a sudden pounce, using its suckers to grip on and pull it in. The O. minor preys on smaller animals by trapping them in the web-like structure of its legs. The O. minor injects its prey with a paralyzing saliva, using miniature teeth at the end of its salivary papilla to dismember them. When targeting shelled molluscs, the O. minor creates a toxic saliva that enables the calcium carbonate of the shell to be broken down. Once the outer protection is penetrated, the prey's muscles relax, allowing the octopus to remove and eat its prey's soft tissues.

Feeding intensities differ between the males and females of the species. Different intensities revolve around the ovarian maturation calendar of the female octopus. From the months of April to July the intensity of feeding in females decreases, while in males it increases. While 10 different taxa have been identified within the stomach of the O. minor, the family Gobiidae was most prevalent during the female's ovarian maturation.

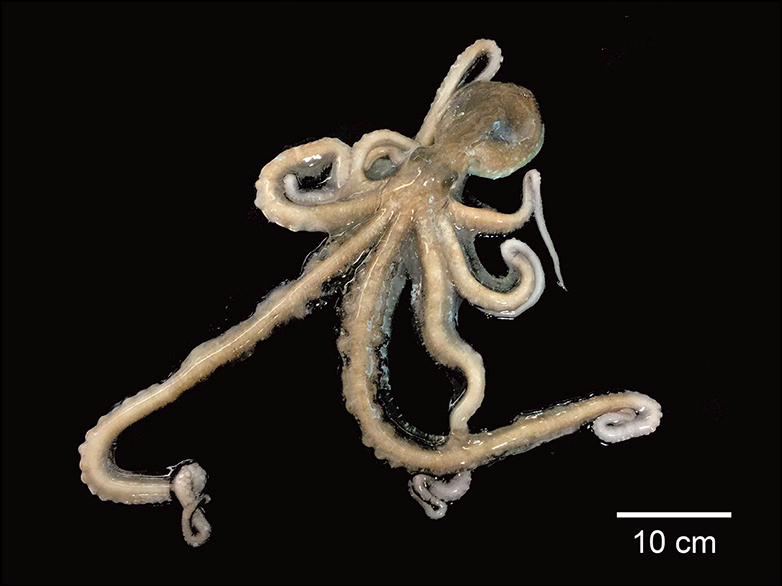
O. minor with scale

=== Locomotion ===
Different to other multi-limbed hydrostats such as crabs, the O. minor performs movements using all eight independent limbs. The arrangement of muscles within its arms allows for movement in any direction. Movements of the O. minor involve crawling between rocks and crevices, and swimming with its dorsal fin in a leading position. Jet propulsion is another form of locomotion also used by the O. minor. The process of crawling involves the use of the octopus's suckers. Some are used to grip to surrounding environments allowing the octopus to pull itself forward with its legs. Others push from behind. This process is repeated until a change of locomotion is performed.

The O. minor performs a swimming motion using the expulsion of water from the mantle through its siphon into the ocean behind it. Force provided by the water allows the octopus to move in the opposite direction. The direction of movement is dependent on the way in which the siphon is faced. The long arms found on the O. minor provide it with a streamline swimming shape. Its bilateral symmetry allows it to move headfirst, with its legs trailing. Jet swimming is used predominantly to escape from danger.

The O. minor performs a movement known as "pumping". This involves the legs of the O. minor contracting in unison, allowing for the production of a wave. This provides a force which moves the body. The O. minor uses its appendages to crawl outside of the water. For the O. minor this is performed between tide pools and when served as a culinary option.

=== Habitat ===
The habitats of O. minor vary greatly between rocks, reefs and the ocean floor. It is a benthic octopus, meaning it lies at the lowest body of water, around the sediment surface and rock or coral cover. O. minor is located within the mudflats of sub-tidal zones surrounding the south western coast of the Korean peninsula. O. minor residing within the mudflats of coastal regions are exposed to high salinity, temperature and water movement conditions. The O. minor is found in rocky areas such as Jeju Island.

The O. minor is commonly found in the Yellow Sea. This is a segment of the Western Pacific Ocean situated between the Korean Peninsula and mainland China, connected to the Gulf of Bohai. The sea extends over 950 kilometres from North to South and 700 kilometres wide. The sea has a cyclone current and semidiurnal tides with temperatures that range from -10 degrees Celsius to 28 degrees Celsius.

=== Colour change ===
The O. minor, when hunting and avoiding predators, use specialised pigment-filled bags known as chromatophores. These are found in the skin, allowing the octopus to adjust its color or reflectivity. Colour variation of chromatophores include red, brown, black, grey, yellow or blue. Other colour methods include the use of an iridescent dermal tissue. This manipulated by the O. minor to communicate with other octopus and proceed with courtship rituals.

The O. minor possesses muscles on its mantle which change texture to assist in changing colour. The shallow water habitats which the O. minor inhabits has allowed it to evolve more diverse skin than fellow cephalopods.

=== Renal parasites ===
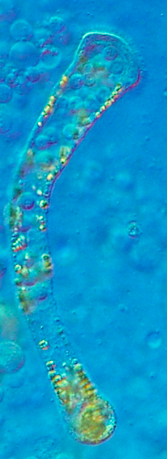
Dicyema clavatum

The O. minor has three species of dicyemids in their renal sac: Dicyema clavatum, Dicyema sphyrocephalum, Dicyema dolichocephalum.

== Relationship to humans ==
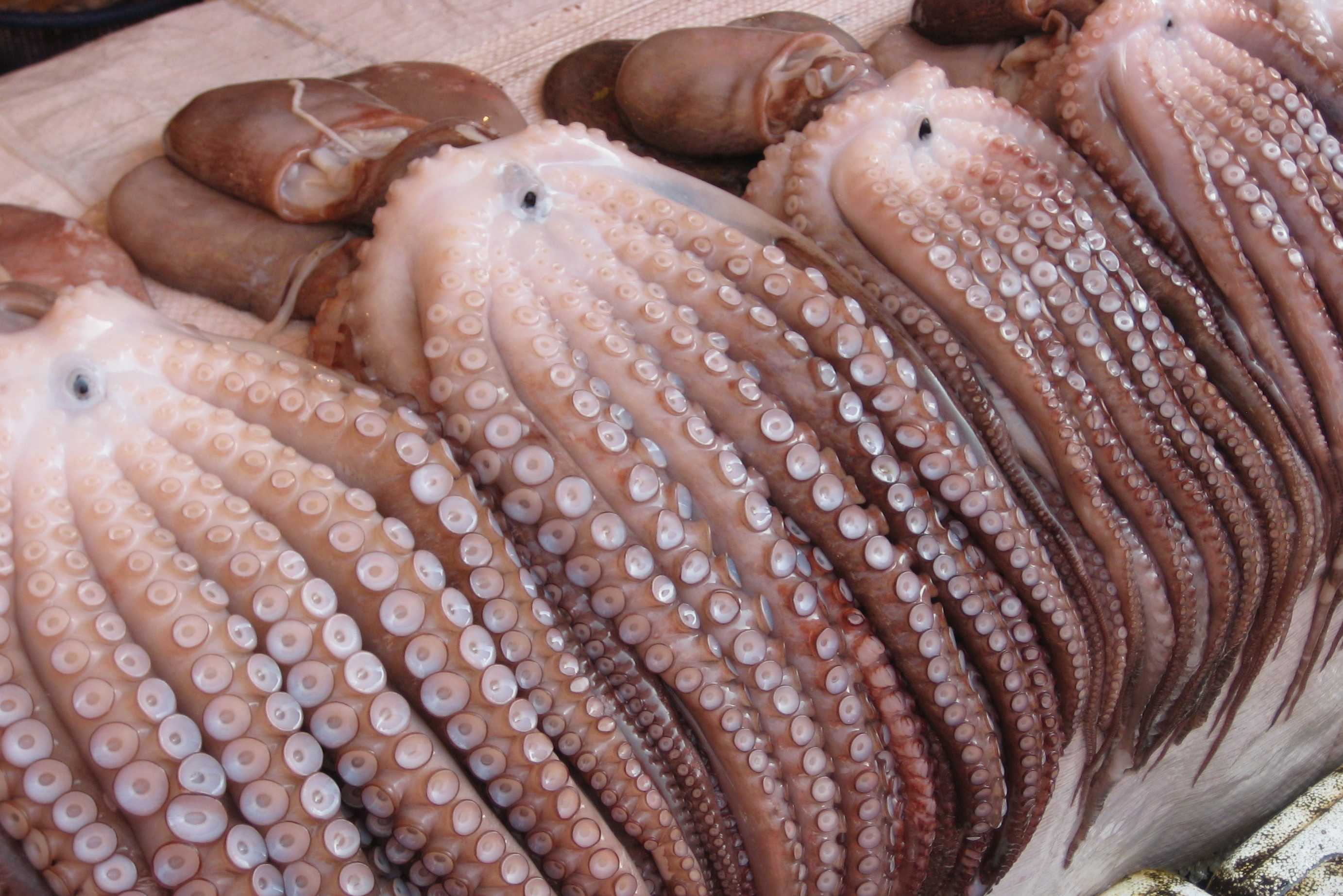
Sold on Jeju Island, South Korea

O. minor is well represented within the Korean commercial fishery field, presenting a high annual yield of over 350,000 tonnes. This has led to its inclusion within multiple signature seafood dishes, mostly found in Korea. The rapid adaption of the octopus to the stressful conditions of its habitat encouraged scientific research and the mapping of its genome.

=== Culinary use ===
Within most parts of Korea, O. minor or Nakji, is a culinary option, being served most commonly as a snack either raw, cooked or poached.

==== Nakji-bokkeum (cooked) ====
For this dish, O. minor is chopped, then stir-fried with vegetables such as carrots, onions and cabbage. It is marinated with a local Korean red pepper sauce, then served hot with warm rice, somyeon, or bean sprouts.

==== San-nakji (raw) ====
For this dish, O. minor is either chopped or whole and served raw on a plate. It is often served with sesame oil and sesame seeds. The significant number of nerve endings in the arms of the O. Minor combined with its sophisticated nervous system, allows for a variety of movements when disconnected from the brain, meaning the octopus performs movements whilst being served. As the suction cups are still active on the cephalopod's arms, they may grip to one's throat, therefore consumers are at risk of choking.

==== Nakji-yeonpo-tang (soup) ====
For this dish, O. minor is boiled in stock, before being chopped into fine pieces then served in the soup with spring onion, chilli and minced garlic. The dish is traditionally offered during funeral processions.

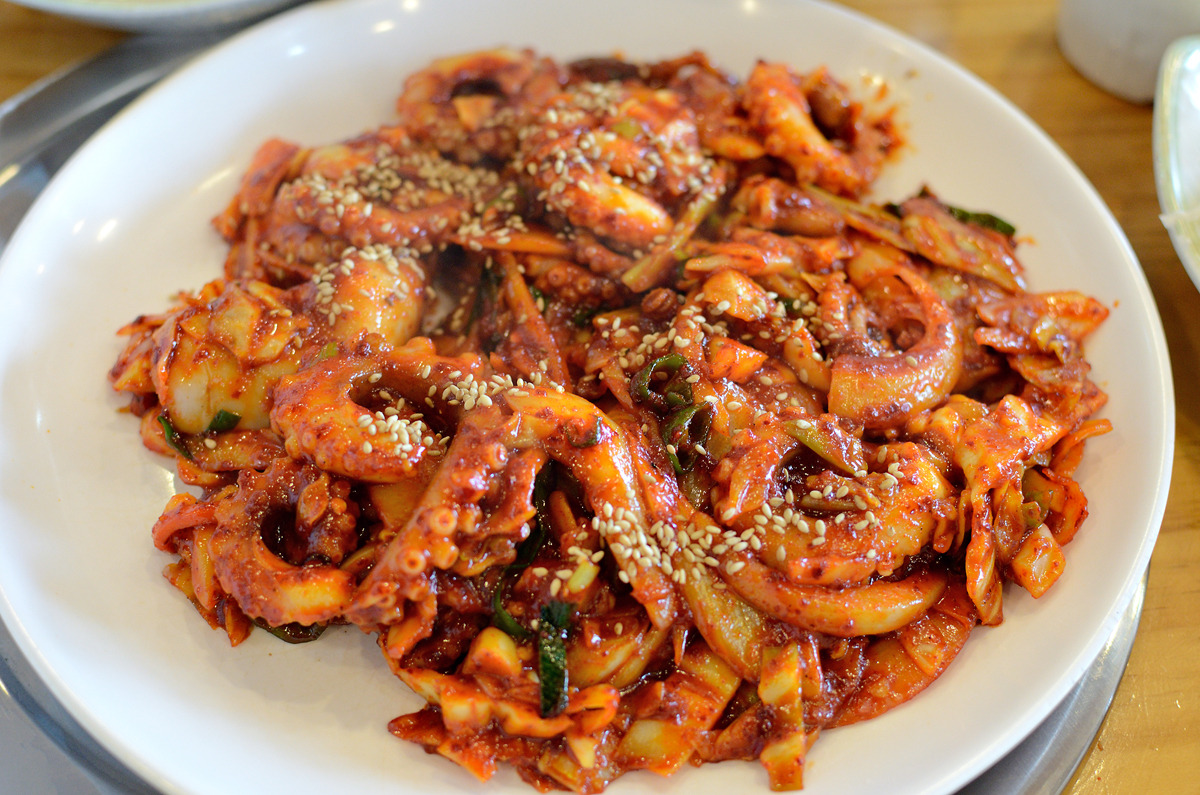
Nakji-bokkeum (cooked)

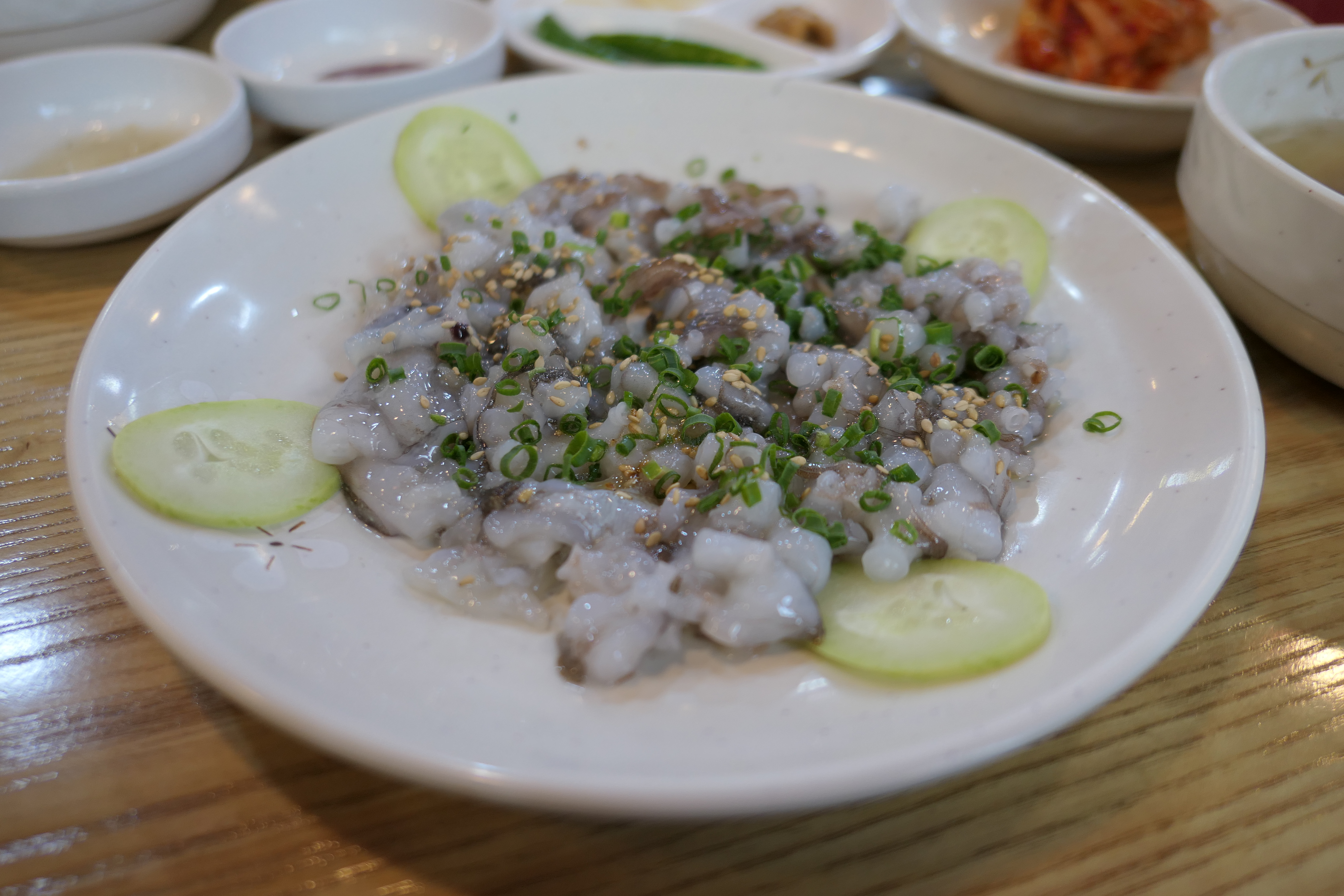
San-nakji (raw)

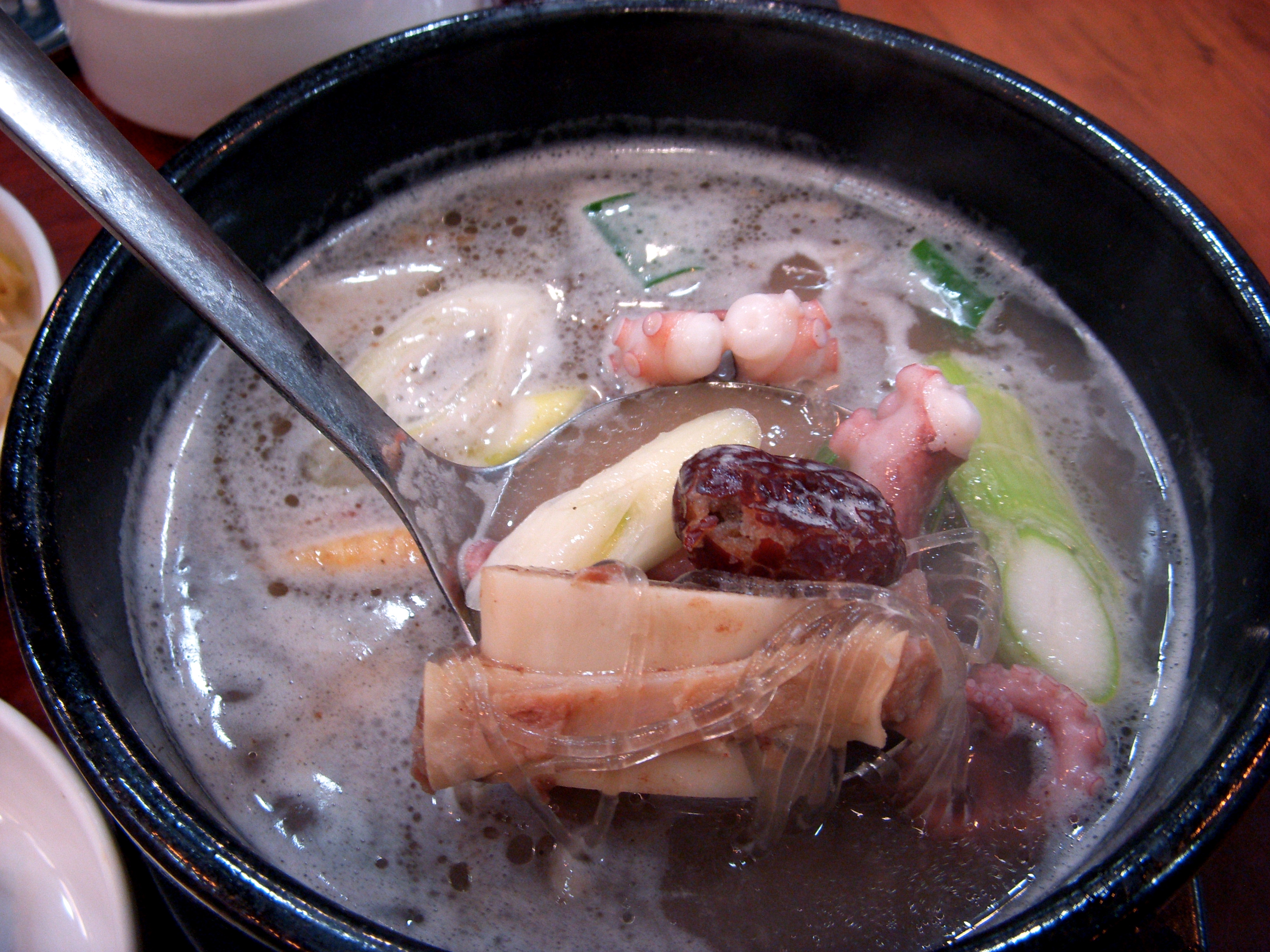
Nakji-Yeonpo-tang (soup)

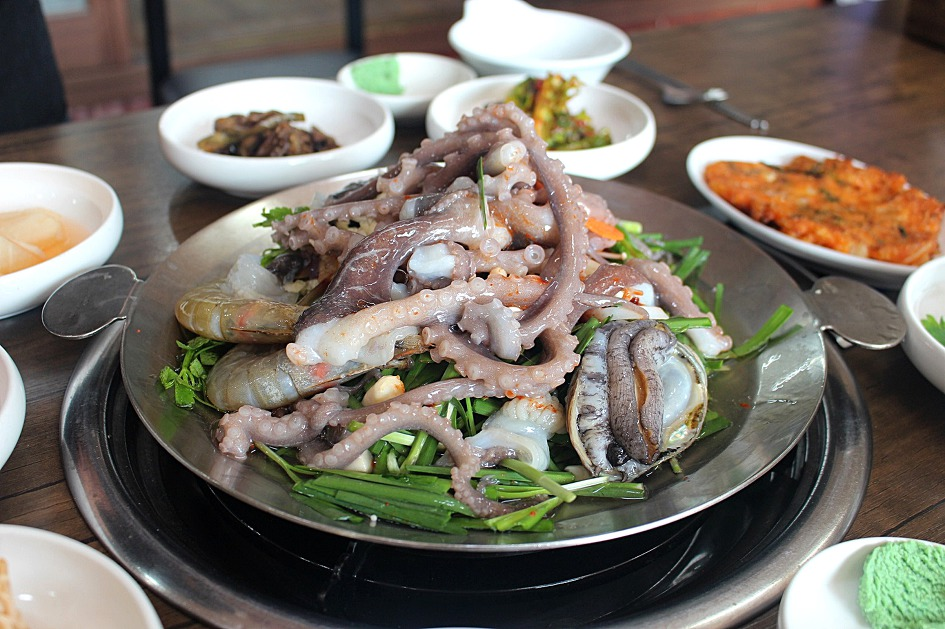
Nakiji-jeongol

=== Dangers ===
A large percentage (22%) of O. minor have been found to host a dangerous parasitic benthic crustacean. Their increased susceptibility is due to its lack of external shell compared to other molluscs, such as snails. The presence Octopicola huanghaienis parasite is identified by a spike at the end of its labrum lap. The parasite is a health concern when O. minor is served raw.

== Genetic research ==
O. minor's adaption of its behavioral repertoire to assorted habitat conditions made it a promising model to be studied and to have its genome mapped. Distributions of the O. minor between the Korean Peninsula and Eastern China identified genetic differences in individuals from different habitats. The borders of these countries are connected by the Yellow Sea. Genetic structures of O. minor were analysed using a sequence of the CO1 gene as it shows higher base-substitution mutation rates.

=== Genome mapping ===
The morphology of the O. minor was analysed for genome mapping. O. minor was studied for its ability to tolerate environmental changes. Its molecular basis was studied for plasticity development and mechanisms underlying adaption. The concluding genome assembly of the octopus was 5.09 Gb, with over 30 010 genes; 44% were made up of repeated elements. The total number of gene families within O. Minor are 178. A highly identical nucleotide sequence across multiple species suggests the O. minor is close to Callistoctopus ornatus and Callistoctopus luteus. Octopus minor has various Korean names, but it is actually the same species as despite them occupying different habitats.
