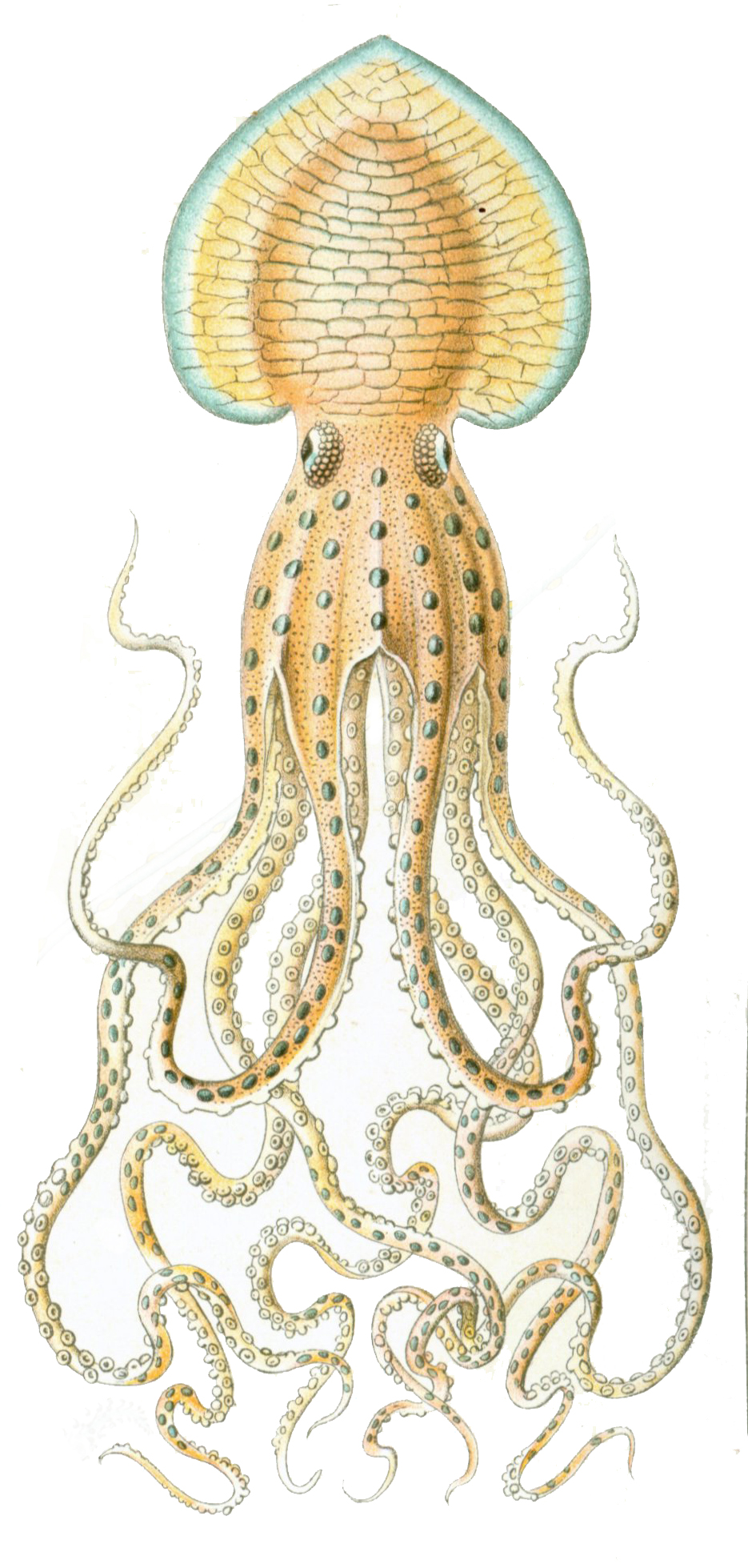
- Pinnoctopus cordiformis

Scientific classification
- Kingdom: Animalia
- Phylum: Mollusca
- Class: Cephalopoda
- Order: Octopoda
- Family: Octopodidae
- Genus: Pinnoctopus d'Orbigny, 1845

Type species
- Octopus cordiformis Quoy & Gaimard, 1832

Species
- See text.

Synonyms
- Callistoctopus Taki, 1964

= Pinnoctopus =

Genus of molluscs

Pinnoctopus is a genus of octopuses belonging to the family Octopodidae. It has been considered to be a synonym of Octopus but some authorities treat it as a valid taxon.

== Species ==
Pinnoctopus contains the following valid species:

- Pinnoctopus alpheus (M. Norman, 1993)
- Pinnoctopus aspilosomatis (M. Norman, 1993)
- Pinnoctopus bunurong (Stranks, 1990)
- Pinnoctopus cordiformis (Quoy & Gaimard, 1832)
- Pinnoctopus dierythraeus (M. Norman, 1993)
- Pinnoctopus furvus (A. A. Gould, 1852)
- Pinnoctopus gracilis (Y. Tang, X.-D. Zheng & C.-C. Lu, 2024)
- Pinnoctopus graptus (M. Norman, 1993)
- Pinnoctopus kermadecensis (S. S. Berry, 1914)
- Pinnoctopus lechenaultii (A. d'Orbigny, 1826)
- Pinnoctopus luteus (M. Sasaki, 1929)
- Pinnoctopus macropus (Risso, 1826)
- Pinnoctopus nocturnus (M. Norman & Sweeney, 1997)
- Pinnoctopus ornatus (A. A. Gould, 1852)
- Pinnoctopus paucilamellus (Y. Tang, X.-D. Zheng & C.-C. Lu, 2024)
- Pinnoctopus rapanui (G. L. Voss, 1979)
- Pinnoctopus sparsus (Y. Tang, X.-D. Zheng & C.-C. Lu, 2024)
- Pinnoctopus tenuipes (J.-H. Li, C-.X. Xu & X.-D. Zheng, 2022)
- Pinnoctopus xiaohongxu (X.-D. Zheng, C.-X. Xu & J.-H. Li, 2022)

=== Taxonomic note ===
Pinnoctopus is treated as a synonym of the genus Octopus Cuvier, 1797 by some authorities. However, the World Register of Marine Species follows MolluscaBase and treats it as a valid taxon. The type species of the genus, P. cordiformis, is not universally regarded as a valid taxon and has been posited as being synonymous with Enteroctopus zealandicus.
