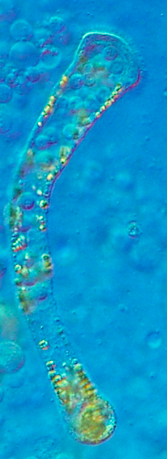

Scientific classification
- Domain: Eukaryota
- Kingdom: Animalia
- Phylum: Dicyemida
- Class: Rhombozoa
- Family: Dicyemidae
- Genus: Dicyema
- Species: D. clavatum

Binomial name
- Dicyema clavatum Furuya & Koshida, 1992

= Dicyema clavatum =

Species of rhombozoa animal

Dicyema clavatum is a species of rhombozoa within the family Dicyemidae. The species is known to parasitise Octopus minor as their hosts off Japan, along with Dicyema dolichocephalum and Dicyema sphyrocephalum, even being found alongside D. sphyrocephalum in O. minor individuals. Lengths of the species average at 1 millimeter.
