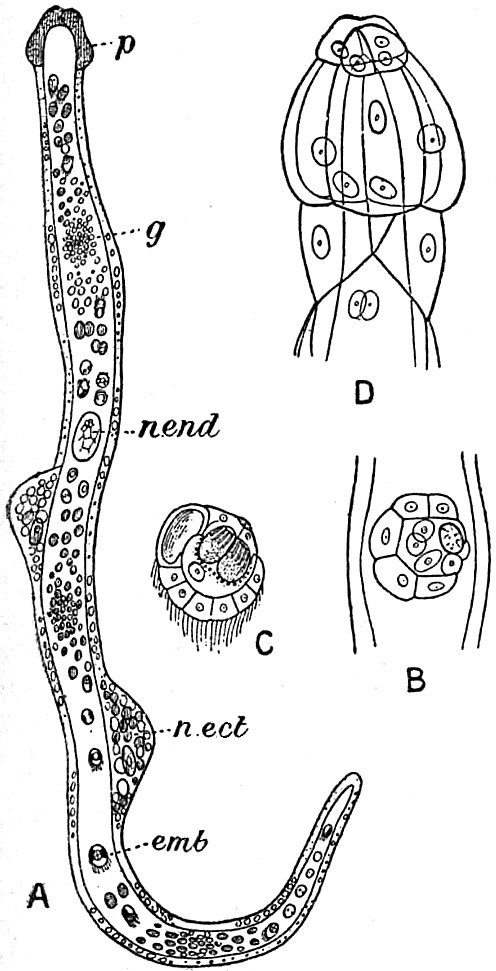
- Dicyemennea eledones

Scientific classification
- Kingdom: Animalia
- Phylum: Dicyemida
- Class: Rhombozoa
- Family: Dicyemidae
- Genus: Dicyemennea; Whitman, 1883

= Dicyemennea =

Genus of rhombozoa animals

Dicyemennea is a genus of worms belonging to the family Dicyemidae.

Species:

- Dicyemennea abasi McConnaughey, 1949
- Dicyemennea abbreviata McConnaughey, 1949
- Dicyemennea abelis McConnaughey, 1949
- Dicyemennea abreida McConnaughey, 1957
- Dicyemennea adminicula (McConnaughey, 1949)
- Dicyemennea adscita McConnaughey, 1949
- Dicyemennea antarcticensis Short & Hochberg, 1970
- Dicyemennea bathybenthum Furuya & Hochberg, 2002
- Dicyemennea brevicephala McConnaughey, 1941
- Dicyemennea brevicephaloides Bogolepova-Dobrokhotova, 1962
- Dicyemennea californica McConnaughey, 1941
- Dicyemennea canadensis Furuya, Hochberg & Short, 2002
- Dicyemennea coromadelensis Kalavati, Narasimhamurti & Suseela, 1978
- Dicyemennea curta Bogolepova-Dobrokhotova, 1962
- Dicyemennea discocephalum Hochberg & Short, 1983
- Dicyemennea dogieli Bogolepova-Dobrokhotova, 1962
- Dicyemennea dorycephalum Furuya & Hochberg, 2002
- Dicyemennea eledones (Wagener, 1857)
- Dicyemennea eltanini Short & Powell, 1969
- Dicyemennea filiformis Bogolepova-Dobrokhotova, 1962
- Dicyemennea gracile (Wagener, 1857)
- Dicyemennea granularis McConnaughey, 1949
- Dicyemennea gyrinodes Furuya, 1999 - parasitizes Octopus hongkongensis
- Dicyemennea kaikouriensis Short & Hochberg, 1969
- Dicyemennea lameerei Nouvel, 1932
- Dicyemennea littlei Short & Hochberg, 1970
- Dicyemennea longinucleata Bogolepova-Dobrokhotova, 1962
- Dicyemennea marplatensis (Penchaszadeh & Christiansen, 1970)
- Dicyemennea mastigoides Furuya, 1999 - parasitizes Sepia esculenta
- Dicyemennea minabense Furuya, 1999 - parasitizes Sepia esculenta
- Dicyemennea nouveli McConnaughey, 1959
- Dicyemennea ophioides Furuya, 1999 - parasitizes Octopus hongkongensis
- Dicyemennea parva Hoffman, 1965
- Dicyemennea pileum Furuya, 2008
- Dicyemennea rossiae Bogolepova-Dobrokhotova, 1962
- Dicyemennea rostrata Short & Hochberg, 1969
- Dicyemennea ryukyuense Furuya, 2006
- Dicyemennea trochocephalum Furuya, 1999 - parasitizes Octopus hongkongensis
- Dicyemennea umbraculum Furuya, 2009 - parasitizes Opisthoteuthis depressa
