= Dicyema shimantoense =

Scientific classification
- Kingdom: Animalia
- Phylum: Dicyemida
- Class: Rhombozoa
- Family: Dicyemidae
- Genus: Dicyema
- Species: D. shimantoense

Binomial name
- Dicyema shimantoense Furuya, 2008

Species of parasitic worm

Dicyema shimantoense is a parasitic worm of the phylum Dicyemida. It is a vermiform mesozoan parasite that infects the renal appendages of the cephalopod Octopus sasakii. The name is derived from the Shimanto River, which is the longest river in Shikoku, and flows into Tosa Bay. A study from 2000 to 2006 used 59 specimens obtained from fishermen at Tosa Bay and Kii Strait in Japan. O. sasakii is a cephalopod found mainly in the shallow-water of Southern Japan. Research found that only those of certain sizes and geographical locations can be infected by D. shimantoense.

There are many species of dicyemids. Examination of the calotte (the anterior ends of dicyemids ) is required to distinguish them. D. shimantoense inserts the conical calottes into intracellular folds of renal appendages.

== Characteristics ==
The body length of D. shimantoense can reach up to 3000 μm. Peripheral cells consist of 4 propolars, 5 metapolars, 2–4 parapolars, and 10–12 trunk cells. There are infusoriform embryos of up to 37 cells. There are 2 nuclei in each cell, and 22 peripheral cells.

== Life cycle ==
The Dicyemids have three stages of life:

1. The nematogen is the asexual stage of dicyemids which produce vermiform larvae in the axial cells
2. Nematogens continue to reproduce in the kidneys until the vermiform matures into rhombogens
3. Rhombogens contain hermaphroditic gonads within the axial cell called the infusorigens (gonads which produce gametes of various sizes)

== Transmission ==
The infection of the parasite are found in the kidneys (there is an independent infection of each kidney). In O. sasakii, however, the mode of transmission is currently unknown.
