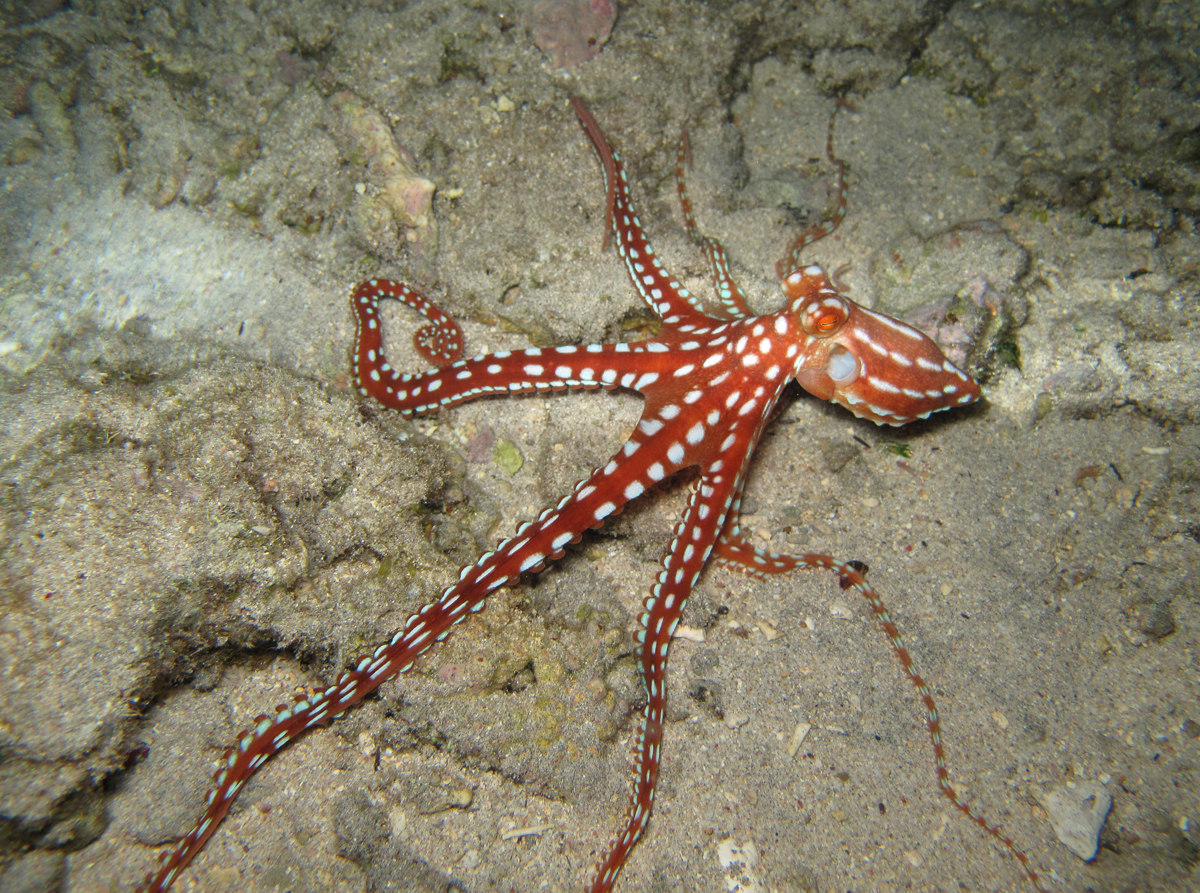

Conservation status
- Least Concern (IUCN 3.1)

Scientific classification
- Kingdom: Animalia
- Phylum: Mollusca
- Class: Cephalopoda
- Order: Octopoda
- Family: Octopodidae
- Genus: Pinnoctopus
- Species: P. ornatus

Binomial name
- Pinnoctopus ornatus (A. A. Gould, 1852)

Synonyms
- Octopus ornatus A. A. Gould, 1852; Callistoctopus ornatus (A. A. Gould, 1852); Callistoctopus arakawai Taki, 1964

= Pinnoctopus ornatus =

Species of mollusc

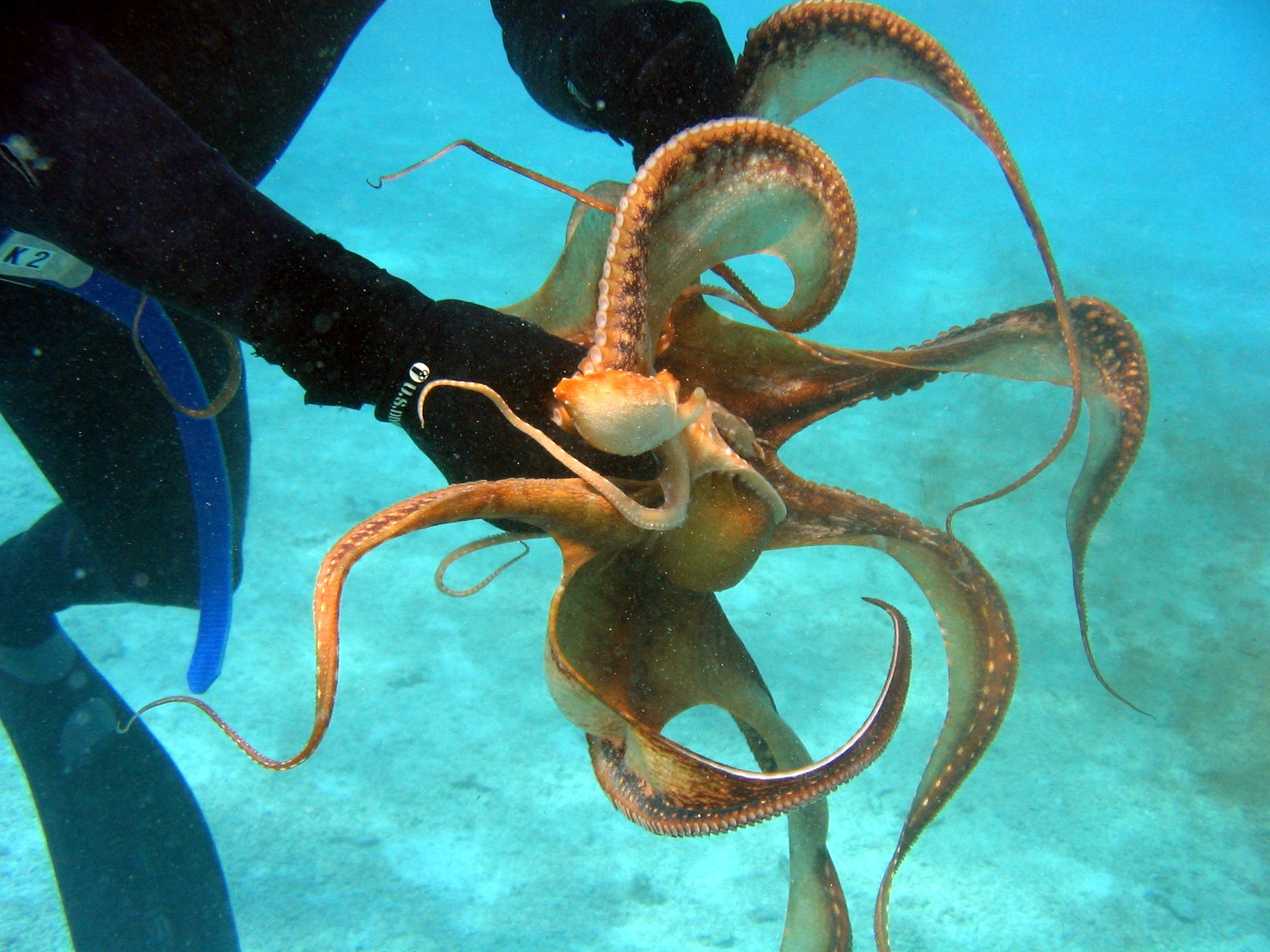
Pinnoctopus ornatus and diver, Northwest Hawaiian Islands

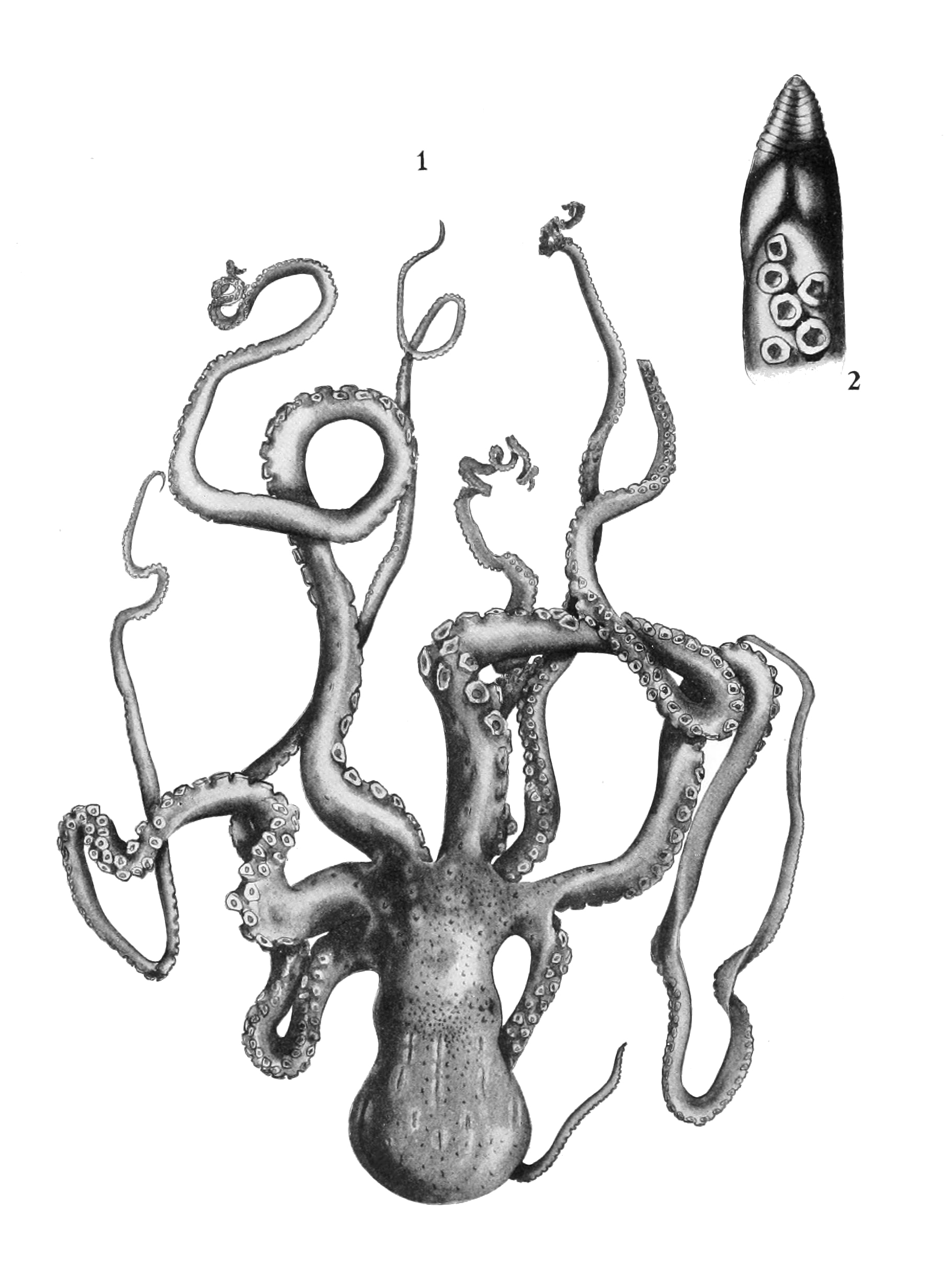
Pinnoctopus ornatus, dorsal view of a medium-sized male from Honolulu

Pinnoctopus ornatus, the ornate octopus, is a tropical species of octopus native to the Indo-Pacific region. Other common names include white-striped octopus and night octopus, in reference to its nocturnal habits. It was previously known as Polypus ornatus. C. ornatus is edible and was recorded in a Hawaiian market in 1914 by S. S. Berry.

== Description ==
The upper arms of Pinnoctopus ornatus are much longer and thicker than the other arms. They are pink to red in colour with paired white spots down the arms and short longitudinal white stripes on their mantle. This species can weigh several kilograms, and can reach an armspan of up to 2 metres (6 ft 7 in). The body is oval-shaped to elongate and the eyes are large. The arms are about six times the length of the body with the front pair being the longest. Each arm has two rows of suckers. The webs are shallow. The skin is fairly smooth with long flaps able to be raised in the white stripes on the sides of the body.

== Distribution ==
This species has one of the widest distributions of all octopus, because of the planktonic life stage of the hatchlings. It is found throughout tropical waters in the Indo-Pacific, from Hawaii and Easter Island to South Africa. In Australian waters it is found from northern New South Wales around the northern coastline to Perth in Western Australia. The distribution of this octopus appears to be limited to tropical waters within the 20 °C (68 °F) isotherm. However, specimens collected in the warm temperate waters of New South Wales are probably a result of the planktonic juveniles being carried south by the warm East Australian Current.

== Habitat ==
Adults are usually found on coral reefs. Lairs found on the southern Great Barrier Reef consist of deep vertical holes excavated in coral rubble. The entrances are sealed during the day with rubble.

== Diet ==
These octopus eat mainly fish and crustaceans. They hunt at night and can be observed foraging over reef flats or on sand and gravel substrate during nightly low tides. Hunting consists of probing long arms down holes or enveloping small coral heads within the webs and using the arm tips to flush prey into the waiting suckers. The stomach contents also regularly contain the beaks of other octopus species. Other night-active octopuses in the same habitat flee in an explosion of ink if a single arm of this octopus touches them.

== Reproduction ==
Nothing is known of mating behaviour. Females lay up to 35,000 small eggs, each about 2 millimetres (0.08 in) long. The hatchlings swim up into the plankton and are carried away by surface currents. Eventually they settle in a new coral reef and develop into adults.

== Use by humans ==
This octopus is harvested by subsistence hunters throughout its range. Historically it was collected by Polynesian Hawaiians using torches to find foraging animals at night. The animals were then killed with hand spears.
