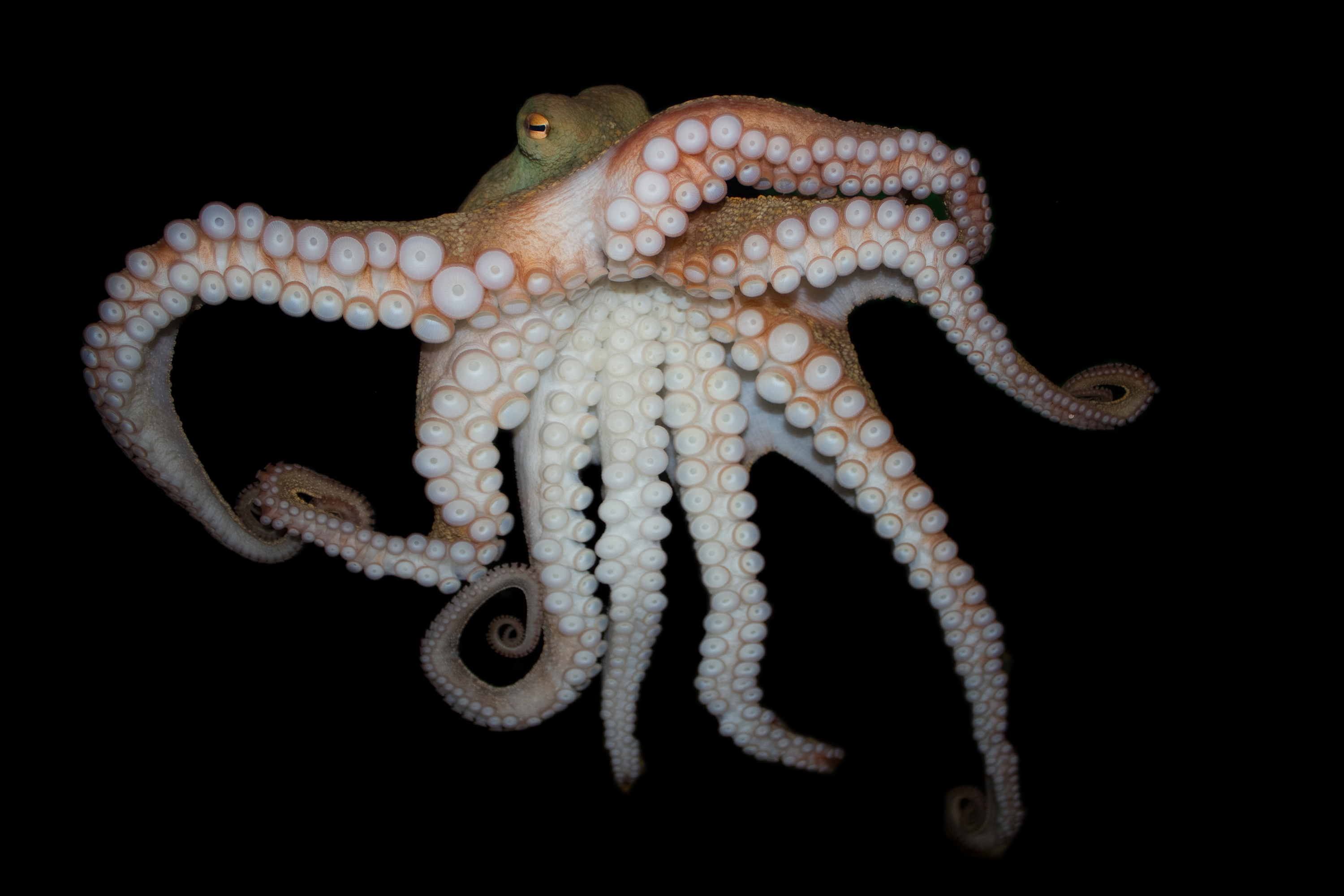

Scientific classification
- Kingdom: Animalia
- Phylum: Mollusca
- Class: Cephalopoda
- Order: Octopoda
- Family: Octopodidae
- Genus: Pinnoctopus
- Species: P. cordiformis

Binomial name
- Pinnoctopus cordiformis (Quoy & Gaimard, 1832)

Synonyms
- Octopus cordiformis Quoy & Gaimard, 1832

= Pinnoctopus cordiformis =

Common New Zealand octopus

Species of mollusc

Pinnoctopus cordiformis is a species of octopus belonging to the "typical octopus" family Octopodidae. This species is found around the coasts of New Zealand. It is one of the most common species of octopus in the country, although the validity of this taxon, as recognised, is disputed, and it may be conspecific with Macroctopus maorum.

== Taxonomy ==
Pinnoctopus cordiformis was first formally described as Octopus cordiformis in 1832 by the French naturalists Jean René Constant Quoy and Joseph Paul Gaimard. The holotype has been lost and a neotype was designated in 1999, the neotype was collected in New Zealand waters from the RV Kaharoa in 1997. The genus Pinnoctopus was proposed by Alcide d'Orbigny in 1845 with O. cordiformis as its type species but this was subsequently considered to be a junior synonym of Octopus. Pinnoctopus is recognised as a valid taxon by some authorities but as invalid by others, with P. cordiformis being regarded as conspecific with Macroctopus maorum, with the latter taxon being treated as the junior synonym, meaning P. cordiformis is treated as a valid taxon. Yet other authorities do not regard P. cordiformis as conspecific with M. maorum and suggest that it is a synonym of Enteroctopus zealandicus.

== Description ==
Pinnoctopus cordiformis is identifiable by its orange-brown or purple-grey colouration; iridescent white spots are found on the arms and web. No white spots can be seen on the mantle.

Pinnoctopus has been seen to reach sizes of over 1m in length and 9 kilograms in weight, however, specimens of this size are seldom seen, due to residing in deeper waters.

Pinnoctopus cordiformis' is quite closely related to Robsonella huttoni. The two can be easily distinguished by comparing a range of features: R. huttoni is about the size of a fist when fully mature, so is considerably smaller than the P, cordiformis; R. huttoni has a single row of suckers, which run up each tentacle, as opposed to Pinnoctopus, which has two rows of oppositely-arranged suckers. Octopus species have no bone structure, which allows easy escape from confined spaces; they also can avoid towed nets, making them difficult to study in the wild.

Pinnoctopus cordiformis has a globe-shaped mantle, which contains the vital organs. it also has a mouth and sharp beak which is used for killing prey. The skin of the octopus is smooth and can change colour slightly to hide from both predators and prey. As a form of self-defense, the octopus can release ink to deter a predator. The eyes of an octopus are considered to be far more developed than those of many other marine species, they are primarily nocturnal and undertake a range of techniques to both escape predators and find prey.

== Distribution ==
=== Natural global range ===
Pinnoctopus cordiformis is primarily found in New Zealand, however they have also been recorded to have been recognized off the coast of South Australia.

=== New Zealand range ===
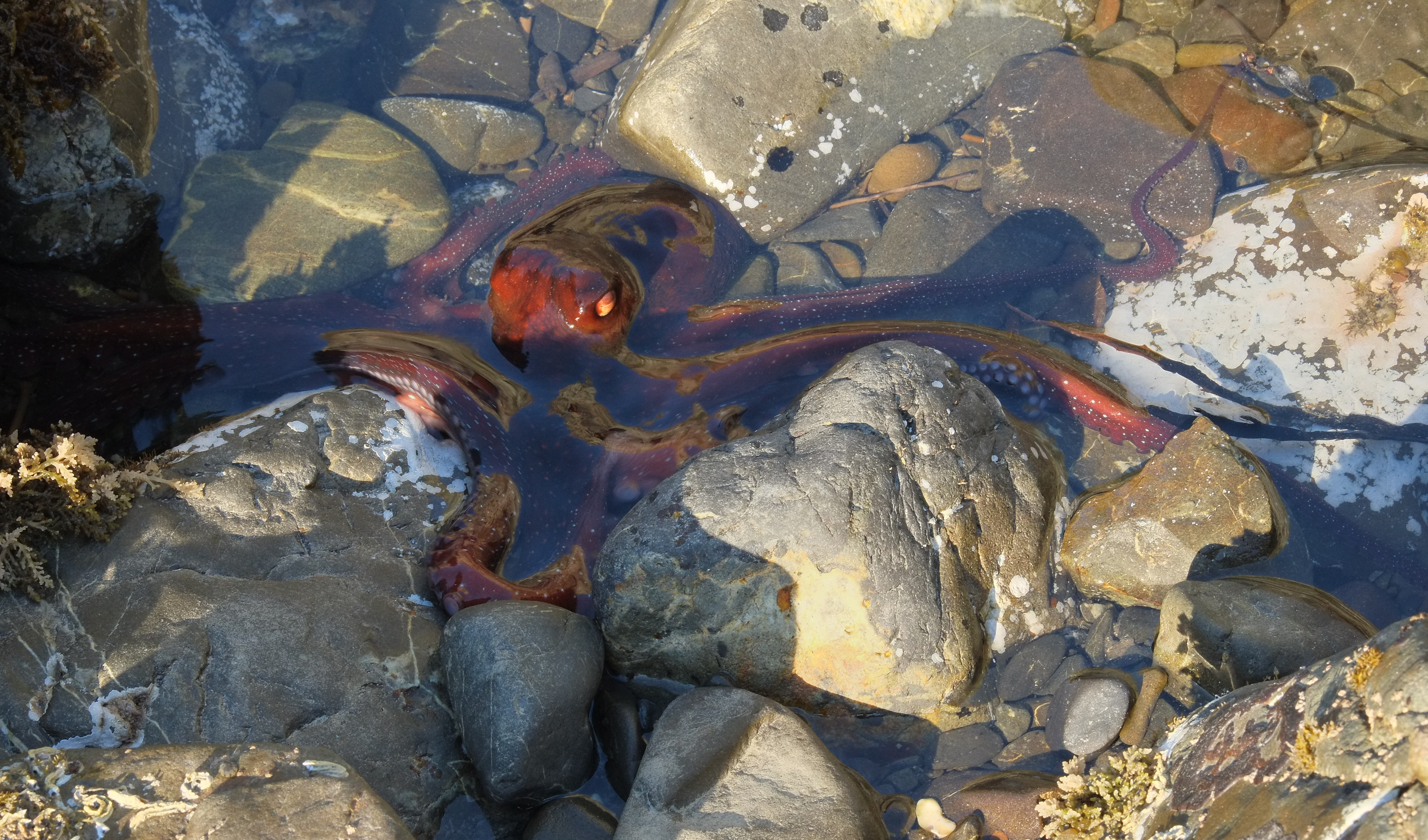
Pinnoctopus cordiformis in shallow rock pool on the coast near Wellington

Pinnoctopus cordiformis is known as a reef octopus, and has been found around New Zealand in Stewart Island (47˚S) to the south of Leigh (36˚S); they have also been found in the Chatham Islands (35˚S to 48˚S). It is one of the most common species of octopus in the country.

=== Habitat preferences ===
Pinnoctopus has been found in waters as deep as 300m, however, it can be found in shallow waters close to coastlines. They are commonly found on the sea floor and occasionally in shallow tidal rock pools. As it grows it ventures into subtidal reefs, here they are among the largest predators feeding off crayfish, crabs, and shellfish. Seagrass and seaweed beds are also common habitats for the Pinnoctopus cordiformis.

== Life cycle/phenology ==
The life cycle of Pinnoctopus cordifomis is relatively short. Once they reach full size, they find a mate. The male dies after mating; females brood their eggs in a den for approximately 80 days. She does not feed for the duration or leave the den. A short time before the eggs hatch, the female ventures out and dies a short distance away from the den.

Pinnoctopus cordiformis can have 56,000–232,000 eggs; other octopuses such as Thaumeledone zeiss, a rare deep-sea octopus only has tens of eggs.

Octopods have two different strategies in terms of spawning, the female can either hatch a few large eggs which are well-developed hatchlings and adopt the benthic promptly, or spawn large quantities of small eggs that hatch into 'planktonic free-swimming paralarvae', which have small suckers, few chromatophores, and a translucent musculature.

The eggs of Pinnoctopus cordifomis are of intermediate size (6.43 ± 0.21 mm L; 1.45 ± 0.11 mm W; 6.41 ± 0.52 mg TW) the yolk can be seen through the wall of the egg and represents approximately 57% of the eggs size, they are pear-shaped. Once the eggs are hatched paralarvae are released which survive without intervention for the duration of their life cycle.

The lifespan of Pinnoctopus cordiformis has been seldom studied; however, it is predicted to be between 12–24 months, depending on mating time.

== Diet and foraging ==
Pinnoctopus cordiformis leaps on any potential prey, wraps its tentacles around it, and paralyzes it with a salivary toxin. The octopus then uses its 'parrot-like' beak to break up and digest the prey. They generally wait by the entrances of caves or crevasses for unsuspecting fish, crustaceans, mollusks, octopuses, and other edible invertebrates.

Pinnoctopus cordiformis has the ability to break open shellfish with its beak or by pulling it apart to eat the fish inside.

Rock lobster and blue cod are two of the primary prey options for Pinnoctopus cordiformis, they get into fishing pots and devour the catch before the fisherman gets a chance. In spring 1970 the Hokianga mean morality rate for blue cod and rock lobster increased to 35%.

== Predators, parasites, and diseases ==
Pinncotopus cordiformis has a large number of predators which are largely the reason for the relatively small and dispersed population. New Zealand sea lions, Buller's albatross, sharks and whales all prey on Pinnoctopus.

== Cultural uses ==
A Maori legend states that the Polynesian navigator Kupe followed a giant octopus known as Te Wheke-o-Muturangi. This octopus was eating all the fish needed for the tribe. Kupe eventually tracked it down in the Cook Strait and killed it by tricking it into holding some water containers while he struck it on the head.

Early Maori used to catch octopus by hand. One hand would act as bait whilst the other was used to pick it up and kill it.
