= Pinnoctopus bunurong =

Southern white-spotted octopus

Conservation status
- Least Concern (IUCN 3.1)

Scientific classification
- Kingdom: Animalia
- Phylum: Mollusca
- Class: Cephalopoda
- Order: Octopoda
- Family: Octopodidae
- Genus: Pinnoctopus
- Species: P. bunurong

Binomial name
- Pinnoctopus bunurong (Stranks, 1990)

Synonyms
- Octopus bunurong Stranks, 1990; Callistoctopus bunurong (Stranks, 1990)

Species of mollusc

Pinnoctopus bunurong, the southern white-spot octopus, is a species of octopus in the family Octopodidae, that can be found in Australia waters at depths of 1 to 130 meters on sandy substrates. It was originally placed in the genus Octopus, having the scientific name Octopus bunurong, but has been moved to the genus Callistoctopus and subsequently to Pinnoctopus.

== Description ==
The shape of P. bunurong is similar to an oval, containing long arms with narrow tips. Its coloration is red, orange, and white, with white spots covering all of the body, and transverse bands of smaller white spots along the arms of it. A white coloration of skin extends along the mantle on each side, and the size of the mantle can grow up to 48 centimetres (19 in) in length. The webs of it are short, almost being transparent.

== Distribution and habitat ==
Its range is in Australia, off coasts of Western Australia, Southern Australia, Victoria, northern Tasmania, and southern New South Wales. It lives at depths from 1 to 130 metres (3 ft 3 in to 426 ft 6 in), buries in sand and seagrass areas, and comes out at night to feed.

== Behavior ==
P. bunurong has the ability to dig into the sand quickly if in danger. The females of P. bunurong lay eggs that can develop well into young, and then settle to the seafloor after they have hatched. At night P. bunurong spends time outside of the sand searching for small crustaceans to eat.

== Conservation ==
There are no specific threats to this species, and has been listed as a 'Least concern' species by the IUCN Red List due to it having a wide range, but further research is needed to know more about its population size, life history and ecology.
