= Yeonpo-tang =

Korean beef or octopus soup dish

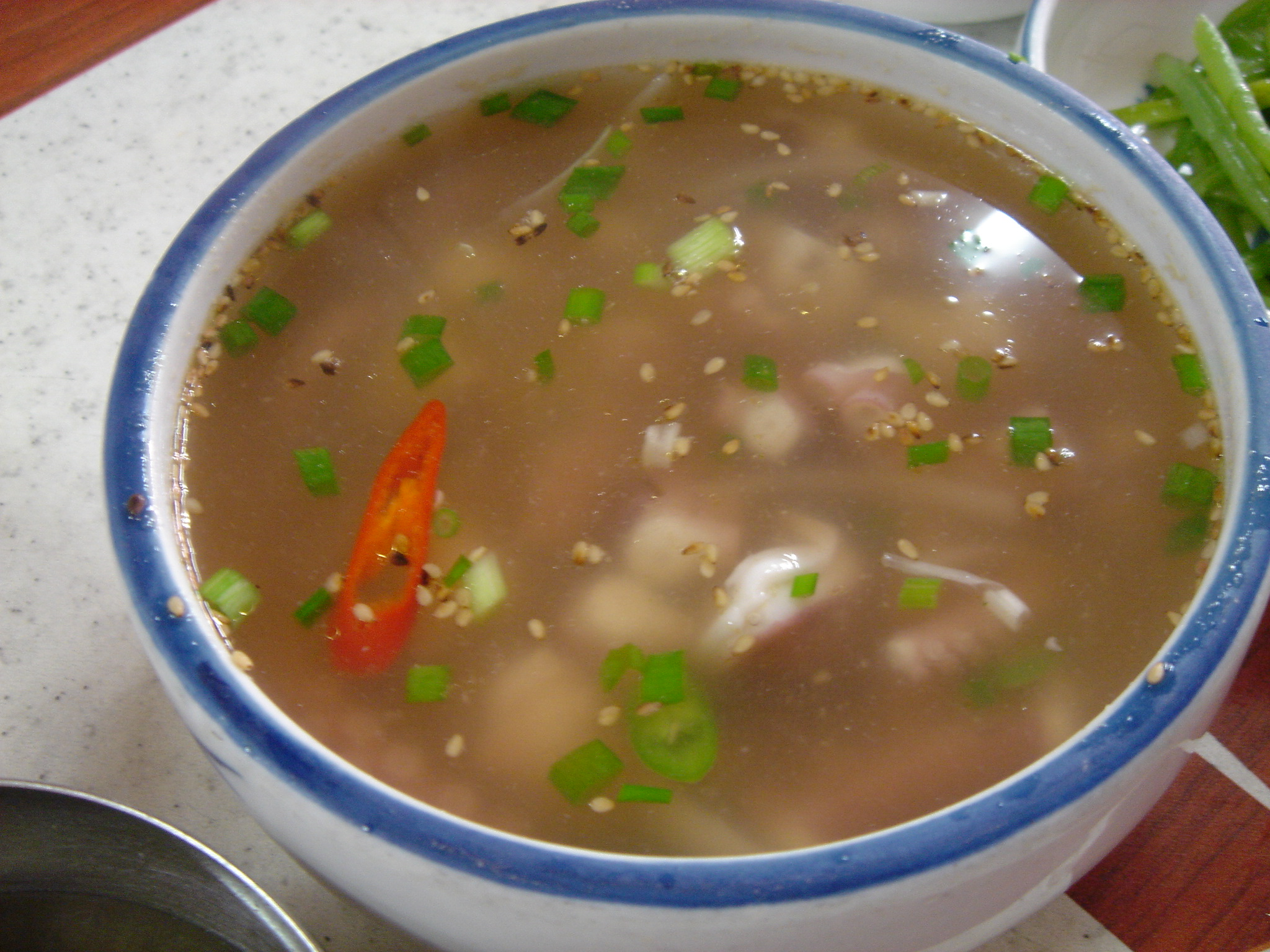
- Nakji-yeonpo-tang (octopus soup)
- Type: Guk
- Place of origin: Korea
- Associated cuisine: Korean cuisine
- Variations: Nakji-yeonpo-tang

Korean name
- Hangul: 연포탕
- Hanja: 軟泡湯
- RR: yeonpotang
- MR: yŏnp'ot'ang
- IPA: [jʌn.pʰo.tʰaŋ]

Alternate name
- Hangul: 연폿국
- Hanja: 軟泡국
- RR: yeonpotguk
- MR: yŏnp'okkuk
- IPA: [jʌn.pʰo(t̚).k͈uk̚]

Octopus soup
- Hangul: 낙지연포탕
- Hanja: 낙지軟泡湯
- RR: nakjiyeonpotang
- MR: nakchiyŏnp'ot'ang
- IPA: [nak̚.t͈ɕi.jʌn.pʰo.tʰaŋ]

Yeonpo-tang (Korean: 연포탕) or yeonpo-guk (연폿국) is a Korean soup made with beef, radish, tofu, and kelp stock.

In South Jeolla Province, a different soup called yeonpo-tang is made with long arm octopus. The local specialty, octopus soup, may also be called nakji-yeonpo-tang (낙지연포탕; "octopus yeonpo-tang") outside the province.

== Preparation ==
Nakji-yeonpo-tang can be prepared by boiling long arm octopus in kelp stock, taking the octopus out, slicing them into bite-sized pieces and putting them back into the soup. The soup is usually seasoned with salt, minced garlic, sliced tree onions, sesame oil, and ground toasted sesame seeds, and is boiled together with the slices of octopus.

== See also ==
- List of seafood dishes
- List of soups
