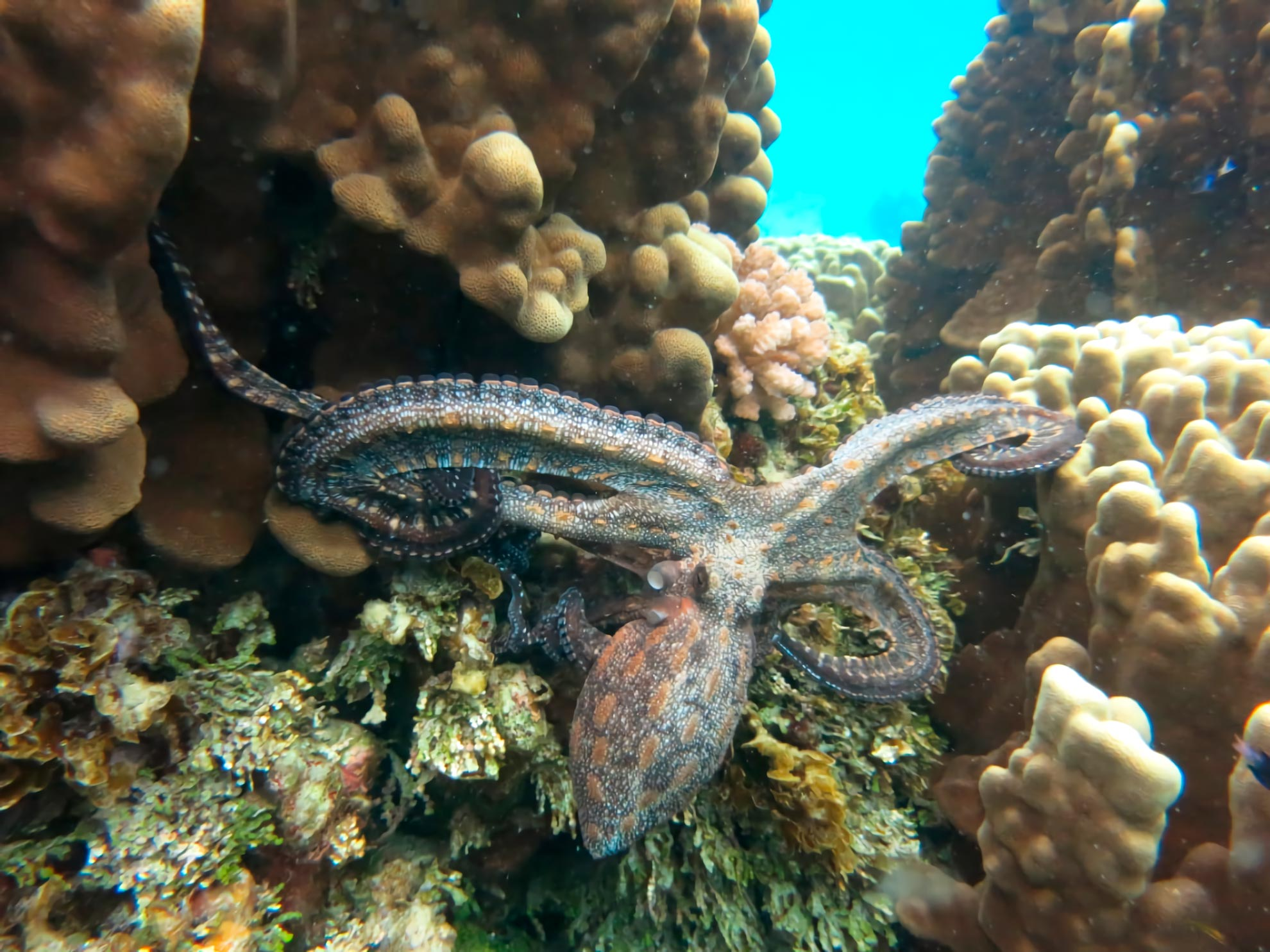

Conservation status
- Data Deficient (IUCN 3.1)

Scientific classification
- Kingdom: Animalia
- Phylum: Mollusca
- Class: Cephalopoda
- Order: Octopoda
- Family: Octopodidae
- Genus: Pinnoctopus
- Species: P. rapanui

Binomial name
- Pinnoctopus rapanui (Voss, 1979)

Synonyms
- Octopus rapanui G. L. Voss, 1979; Callistoctopus rapanui (G. L. Voss, 1979)

= Pinnoctopus rapanui =

Species of mollusc

Pinnoctopus rapanui, or the rapanui octopus, is the only endemic octopus species in Rapa Nui (or Easter Island). It was first described by Gilbert L. Voss in 1979 as Octopus rapanui.

== Description ==
Pinnoctopus rapanui is large and muscular, with a mantle length of up to 115 millimetres (4.5 in) and a total length of up to 550 millimetres (22 in). It has scattered rough tubercles across the body. The arms are 3.5 to 4.5 times the length of the mantle, and have two rows of suckers each. P. rapanui is cream-gray with a darker purple hue on its dorsal surfaces. Its most distinctive feature is a "straight, out-turned" rostrum.

== Distribution ==
Pinnoctopus rapanui is subtropical and only known in Rapa Nui. It is benthic, and found at depths of zero to four metres (0 to 13 ft).

== Use by humans ==
Pinnoctopus rapanui are fished for food in Rapa Nui, and make up 0.6% of subsistence fishing catch.
