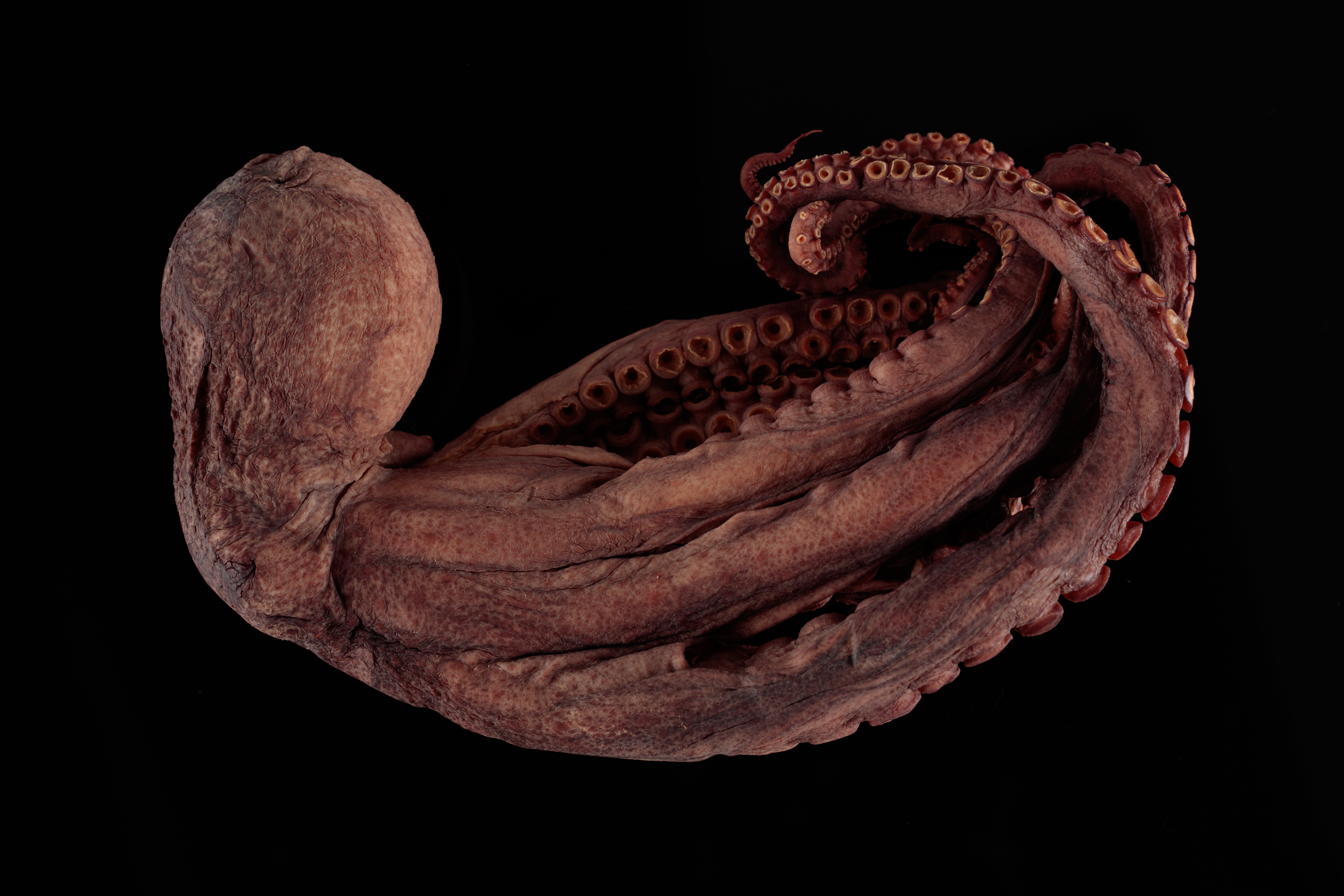

Conservation status
- Data Deficient (IUCN 3.1)

Scientific classification
- Kingdom: Animalia
- Phylum: Mollusca
- Class: Cephalopoda
- Order: Octopoda
- Family: Octopodidae
- Genus: Pinnoctopus
- Species: P. kermadecensis

Binomial name
- Pinnoctopus kermadecensis (Berry, 1914)

Synonyms
- Callistoctopus kermadecensis (Berry, 1914); Octopus kermadecensis (Berry, 1914); Polypus kermadecensis Berry, 1914

= Pinnoctopus kermadecensis =

Species of mollusc

Pinnoctopus kermadecensis is a species of octopus belonging to the typical octopus family Octopodidae. It is endemic to the Kermadec Islands. It was first described as Polypus kermadecnsis in 1914 from a female specimen. No male specimen was collected and described until 2011.
