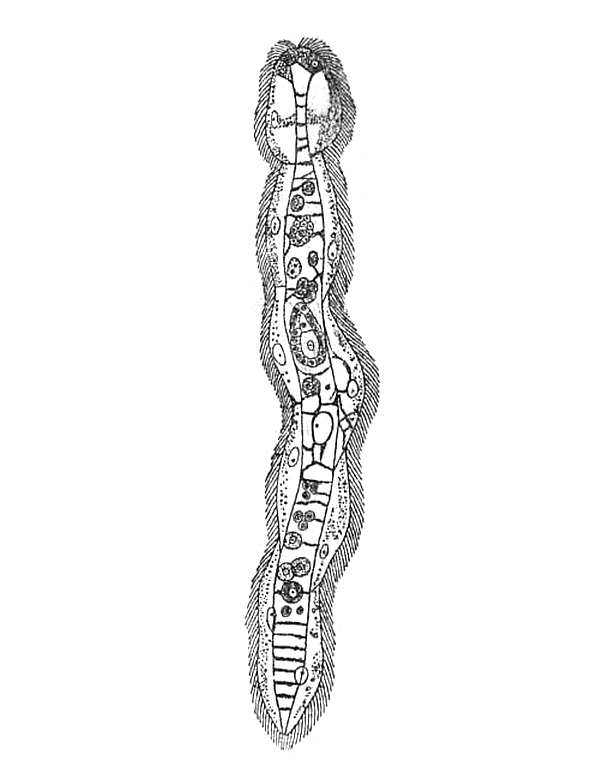
- Dicyema macrocephalum

Scientific classification
- Kingdom: Animalia
- Phylum: Dicyemida
- Class: Rhombozoa
- Family: Dicyemidae van Beneden, 1882

Genera
- See text

= Dicyemidae =

Family of rhombozoa animals

The Dicyemidae is a family of tiny parasites that live in the renal appendages of cephalopods. It contains the following genera and species:

- Dicyema von Kolliker, 1849
- Dicyemennea Whitman, 1883
- Dicyemodeca
  - Dicyemodeca anthinocephalum Furuya, 1999 - parasitizes Octopus dofleini
  - Dicyemodeca deca (McConnaughey, 1957)
  - Dicyemodeca dogieli Bogolepova, 1957
- Dodecadicyema Kalavati & Narasimhamurti, 1979
  - Dodecadicyema loligoi Kalavati & Narasimhamurti, 1980
- Pleodicyema
  - Pleodicyema delamarei Nouvel, 1961
- Pseudicyema Nouvel, 1933
  - Pseudicyema cappacephalum Furuya, 2009
  - Pseudicyema nakaoi Furuya, 1999 - parasitizes Sepia lycidas and Sepia esculenta
  - Pseudicyema truncatum (Whitman, 1883)
