= Octopus sasakii =

Scientific classification
- Domain: Eukaryota
- Kingdom: Animalia
- Phylum: Mollusca
- Class: Cephalopoda
- Order: Octopoda
- Family: Octopodidae
- Genus: Octopus
- Species: O. sasakii

Binomial name
- Octopus sasakii Iw. Taki, 1942

Species of mollusc

Octopus sasakii is a species of octopus found only in salt water. This species is a taxon inquirendum.

== Physical description ==
It is able to change its color. It moves forward by vigorously squeezing water in its cloak and pumping it through the siphon.

== Diet ==
It is carnivorous with a diet consisting mainly of fish, crabs, lobsters and molluscs, which it catches with the suction cups on its tentacles.

== Parasitism ==
It is parasitized by Dicyema shimantoense, which infects its renal appendages.

== Name ==
The specific name honors the Japanese zoologist Madoka Sasaki who died in 1927.
