= Iwao Taki =

Japanese malacologist

- 瀧 巖 (たき いわお)
- Born: Iwao Taki; 19 June 1901; Japan Matsuyama City, Ehime Prefecture
- Died: May 31, 1984 (aged 82); Japan
- Education: Hiroshima Higher Normal School; Kyoto Imperial University
- Known for: Developing malacology in Japan
- Awards: 3rd Class, the Order of the Rising Sun
- Scientific career
- Fields: Taxonomy, Malacology
- Workplaces: Denshukan, Fukuoka Prefectural Junior High School; Kyoto Imperial University; Hiroshima University of Literature and Science; Hiroshima University; Kansai Gaidai University; Kyoto Sangyo University
- Author abbrev. (zoology): Iwao Taki; Iw. Taki; Taki

Iwao Taki (Japanese name: 瀧巖, 瀧巌, 滝巌, Hiragana: たき いわお, 19 June 1901 - 31 May 1984) was a Japanese malacologist. He described many taxa of Mollusca with Isao Taki (his brother), Tadashige Habe and Tokubei Kuroda.

== Life ==
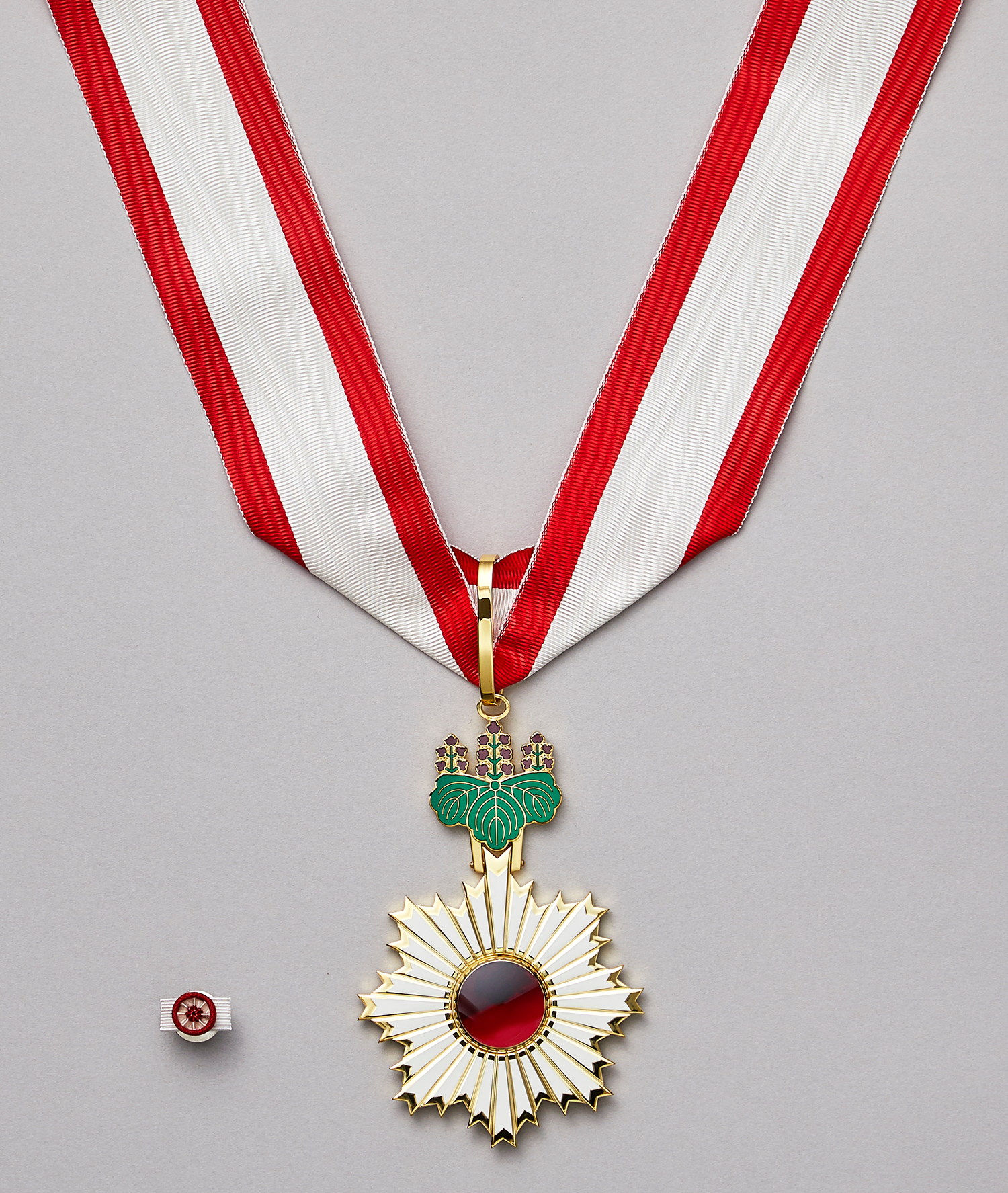
3rd Class, the Order of the Rising Sun

Iwao Taki was born on 19 June 1901 in Matsuyama City, Ehime Prefecture. On the suggestion of his brother, Isao Taki, he entered Hiroshima Higher Normal School in 1920. He graduated and worked at Denshukan, Fukuoka Prefectural Junior High School as a teacher in 1924. The next year, he entered Department of zoology, Faculty of Science, Kyoto Imperial University. In 1928, he graduated and worked in Seto Marine Biological Laboratory. He returned to Kyoto in August, and he founded The Malacological Society of Japan (Japanese: 日本貝類学会), and was involved in publishing the journal "Venus". In 1929, he became an assistant of department of zoology, Kyoto Imperial University. In 1933, he became assistant professor in the Marine Biological Laboratory at the Hiroshima University of Literature and Science. In 1950, he was appointed to a professorship of the Faculty of Fisheries and Animal Husbandry, Hiroshima University and became a head of marine biological laboratory. He was rarely involved in the graduate research of students because of his position, but he taught Yoichi Kado (1917 - 1985) after the end of World War II. In 1952, he was promoted to professor of the Faculty of Fisheries and Animal Husbandry, Hiroshima University and he doubled as professor of the Faculty of Science, Hiroshima University and the head of marine biological laboratory until the next year.

In 1953, he named one of the meritorious men of The Malacological Society of Japan. From 1961 to 1965, he worked as the branch manager of the Faculty of Fisheries and Animal Husbandry annex, Hiroshima University Library. After retirement, he became professor emeritus of Hiroshima University. In addition, he served as the president of The Malacological Society of Japan from 1963 to 1978. After his term, he became honorary president of The Malacological Society of Japan. In 1966 when he retired from Hiroshima University, he became a professor at Kansai Gaidai College for one year. Subsequently, he worked as professor of Kansai Gaidai University from 1967 to 1968. After that, he was a professor of Kyoto Sangyo University from 1967 to 1978, Kyoto Sangyo University guest professor from 1978 to 1979 and Kyoto Sangyo University part-time lecturer from 1979 to 1981.

In 1971, he was awarded the Order of the Rising Sun, 3rd class.

He died on 31 May 1984 and was raised to Shosanmi.

== Bibliography ==
This is the list of his work based on the Malacological Society of Japan (1984) "List of Malacological Publications by Dr. Iwao Taki".

=== Journal articles ===
- 瀧巖 (1929). モノアラガイの成長に及ぼす養水の量の影響. Zoological Magazine 動物学雑誌. 41 (490–491): 414–416.
- —— (1932). ヒザラガイ類殻板における異状の数例について. 京都大学理学部紀要. 8 (1): 27–64.
- Taki, Iwao (1935). "Notes on a warty growth on the head of some land snails". J. Sci. Hiroshima Univ. B, Div. 1 (3): 159–183.
- —— (1936). "Observations on autography in octopus". Annotationes Zoologicae Japonenses. 15 (3): 352–354.
- 瀧巖 (1937). マダコ属3種の雌雄. Zoological Magazine 動物学雑誌. 49: 92–93.
- —— (1940). 頭足類の鰓腺について. Zoological Magazine 動物学雑誌. 52: 91–92.
- —— (1941). マダコの去勢について. Zoological Magazine 動物学雑誌. 50: 109–110.
- —— (1943). タコに関する研究（I）鰓腺. 広島大学理学部紀要. 10 (8): 131–151.
- —— (1949). 頭足類の観察. 兵庫生物. 1 (3): 1–5.
- —— (1950). 和歌山県産ヒザラガイ目録. 南紀生物. 1 (3): 122–124.
- Taki, Iwao; Habe, Tadashige (1950). "Xylophagidae in Japan". Illustrated Catalogue of Japanese Shells (7): 45–47.
- ——; —— (1955). "Gastrochaenidae in Japan". Illustrated Catalogue of Japanese Shells. 2 (1): 1–6.
- ——; —— (1955). "Pholadidae in Japan". Illustrated Catalogue of Japanese Shells. 2 (2): 7–15.
- 瀧巖 (1959). イカ・タコ類の生態と人生関係 1. 自然科学と博物館. 26 (5–6): 1–7.
- —— (1959). イカ・タコ類の生態と人生関係 2. 自然科学と博物館. 26 (7–8): 1–11.
- —— (1959). 尾道水道及び付近の貝類についての考察. 兵庫生物. 3 (5): 394–395.
- —— (1961). 頭足類の系統についての考察（要旨）. The bulletin of the Japanese society of Systematic Zoology (動物分類学会会報) (25): 10.
- Taki, Iwao (1961). "On two new eledonid octopods from the Antarctic Sea". Journal of the Faculty of Fisheries & Animal Husbandary, Hiroshima University. 3 (2): 297–316.
- 瀧巖 (1962). 日本産頭足類相に新加入の種について. Zoological Magazine 動物学雑誌. 71: 3997–398.
- —— (1962). 頭足類採集便覧. ちりぼたん. 2 (3): 63–76.
- Taki, Iwao (1963). "On four newly known species of Octopoda from Japan". Journal of the Faculty of Fisheries & Animal Husbandary, Hiroshima University. 5 (1): 57–93.
- 瀧巖 (1964). "On eleven new species of the Cephalopoda from Japan including two new genera of Octopodinae". Journal of the Faculty of Fisheries & Animal Husbandary, Hiroshima University. 5 (2): 77–343.
- Taki, Iwao (1964). "On the morphology and physiology of the branchial gland in Cephalopoda". Journal of the Faculty of Fisheries & Animal Husbandary, Hiroshima University. 5 (2): 345–408.
- 瀧巖; 五十嵐孝夫 (1967). 北海道水産学部水産資料館所蔵 頭足類標本目録 (故佐々木望博士蒐集標本及び水産動物学教室蒐集標本) (7). 北海道大学水産学部（函館）資料水産館 資料: 1–27.
- —— (1973). 生物学御研究所編, 相模湾貝類. Venus: The Japanese Journal of Malacology. 31 (4): 138.
- Taki, Iwao (1972). "On a new specie of Lamellaria (L. utinomii, n. sp.) from Shirahama, Wakayama Prefecture, Japan (Mol., Gastropoda)". Publications of the Seto Marine Biological Laboratory. 21 (1): 1–12. doi:10.5134/175801.
- 瀧巖 (1973). 駒井卓先生の追悼. Venus: The Japanese Journal of Malacology. 31 (4): 164. doi:10.18941/venusjjm.31.4_164_1. ISSN 0042-3580.
- —— (1975). オウムガイ類の貝殻と"turbo"の語について. ターボ機械. 3 (5): 801–803.
- —— (1978). 軟体動物の分類. Venus. 37 (3): 160–162.
- Taki, Iwao (1981). "A catalogue of the Cephalopoda of Wakayama Prefecture". Catalogue of Molluscs of Wakayama Prefecture of Kii (1): 233–264.

=== Books ===
- 瀧巖 (1938). 広島県産貝類目録. 広島県. doi:10.11501/1903879.
- —— (1938). 有用・有害・観賞水産動植物図鑑（貝類）. 大地書院.
- —— (1950). 頭足類の諸考察. In 中村健児 編 (ed.). 現代生物学の諸問題. 増進堂.
- —— (1950). 瀬戸内海の魚介類. 日本交通公社.
- —— (1954). 学生版 動物図鑑（貝類）. 北隆館.
- —— (1960). 頭足綱. In 岡田要 他 (ed.). 原色動物大図鑑. 北隆館. pp. 38–4.
- —— (1965). 頭足綱. In 内田亨 他 (ed.). 新日本動物図鑑. 北隆館. pp. 307–326.
- —— (1977). 頭足綱. In 今島実・武田正倫 編 (ed.). 新編日本動物図鑑. 北隆館. pp. 332–337.

== Molluscan species described by him ==
The species lists is based on The Malacological Society of Japan (1984)"Molluscan Taxa Described by Dr. Iwao Taki".

=== Polyplacophora ===
The list of chitons named by Iwao Taki.

- Acanthochiton dissimilis Isao Taki & Iwao Taki, 1931
- Chiton kurodai Isao Taki & Iwao Taki, 1929
- Chiton komainus Isao Taki & Iwao Taki, 1929
- Cryptoplax propior Isao Taki & Iwao Taki, 1930
- Ischnochiton (Lepidozona) iyoensis Isao Taki & Iwao Taki, 1929
- Ischnochiton comptus Gould, 1859 form isaoi Iwao Taki, 1964
- Ischnochiton (Stenoplax) uenustus Isao Taki & Iwao Taki, 1931
- Lepidopleurus hirasei Isao Taki & Iwao Taki, 1929
- Notoplax (Ikedaella) conicus Isao Taki & Iwao Taki, 1929
- Notoplax (Notoplax) dalli Isao Taki & Iwao Taki, 1929

=== Cephalopoda ===
The list of octopuses and squids named by Iwao Taki.

- Benthoctopus fuscus Iwao Taki, 1964
- Benthoctopus violescens Iwao Taki, 1964
- Callistoctopus arakawai Iwao Taki, 1964
- Callistoctopus meganocellatus Iwao Taki, 1964
- Calliteuthis inermis Iwao Taki, 1964
- Enoploteuthis therarage Iwao Taki, 1964
- Idioctopus gracilipes Iwao Taki, 1962
- Megaleledone senoi Iwao Taki, 1961
- Octopus marginatus Iwao Taki, 1964
- Octopus (Octopus) mutilans Iwao Taki, 1942
- Octopus (Octopus) sasakii Iwao Taki, 1942 [for Octopus globosus Sasaki, 1929]
- Onykia japonica Iwao Taki, 1964
- Opisthoteuthis japonica Iwao Taki, 1962
- Pareledone umitakae Iwao Taki, 1961
- Paroctopus araneoides Iwao Taki, 1964
- Paroctopus megalops Iwao Taki, 1964
- Sasakinella eurycephala Iwao Taki, 1964

=== Gastropoda ===
The list of gastropods named by Iwao Taki.

- Lamellaria utinomii Iwao Taki, 1972
- Mesophaedusa moriyai Kuroda & Iwao Taki, 1944
- Oncidella kurodai Isao Taki & Iwao Taki, 1935
- Oncidella orientalis Isao Taki & Iwao Taki, 1935
- Polynices (mammilla) kurodai Iwao Taki, 1942 [for Natica macrostoma Philippi, 1852]
- Stereophaedusa costifera Kuroda & Iwao Taki, 1944
- Tyrannophaedusa kawamotoi Kuroda & Iwao Taki, 1944

=== Bivalvia ===
The list of bivalves named by Iwao Taki.

- Bankia (Bankia) komaii Iwao Taki & Habe, 1945
- Kuphus (Coeloteredo) teredoides Iwao Taki & Habe, 1945
- Kuphus (Idioteredo) kiiensis Iwao Taki & Habe, 1945
- Mesopholus intusgranosa Iwao Taki & Habe, 1945
- Mesopholus nucicola Iwao Taki & Habe, 1945
- Psiloteredo (Phylloteredo) amboinensis Iwao Taki & Habe, 1945
- Psiloteredo (Phylloteredo) kirai Iwao Taki & Habe, 1945
- Psiloteredo (Psiloteredo) pentagonalis Iwao Taki & Habe, 1945
- Scintilia violescens Kuroda & Iwao Taki, 1962
- Teredo (Lyrodus) taiwanensis Iwao Taki & Habe, 1945
- Xylophaga rikuzenica Iwao Taki & Habe, 1945

== Molluscan taxa described by him ==
The lists of taxa below are based on The Malacological Society of Japan (1984)"Molluscan Taxa Dedicated to Dr. Iwao Taki".

=== Genus group taxa ===
- genus Callistoctopus Iwao Taki, 1964
- genus Idioctopus Iwao Taki, 1962
- subgenus Idioteredo Iwao Taki & Habe, 1945
- subgenus Ikedaella Isao Taki & Iwao Taki, 1929
- genus Megaleledone Iwao Taki, 1961
- genus Mesopholus Iwao Taki & Habe, 1945
- genus Protoxylophaga Iwao Taki & Habe, 1945
- genus Sasakinella Iwao Taki, 1964

=== Family group taxa ===
- family Idioctopodidae Iwao Taki, 1962
- subfamily Megaleledoniae Iwao Taki, 1961

=== Phylum group taxa ===
- subphylum Lecithophora Iwao Taki, 1961
- subphylum Larvacea Iwao Taki, 1961

== Molluscan taxa dedicated to him ==
Almost all taxa were named using his fullname because of the existence of Taki Isao, a malacologist who studies Chiton and his elder brother.

- Adipicola iwaotakii (Habe, 1958) [syn. Adula iwaotakii Habe, 1958]
- Amaea iwaotakii Azuma, 1961
- Dimya radiata takii Kuroda, 1932
- Divarilima iwaotakii (Habe, 1961) [syn. Acesta iwaotakii Habe, 1961]
- Ferreiraella takii (Wu & Okutani, 1984)
- Galeomma takii Kuroda, 1928
- Hemiphaedusa hemileuca takii Kuroda, 1936
- Iwaoa reticulata Kuroda, 1953
- Monophorus iwaotakii (Kosuge, 1963) [syn. Notosinister iwaotakii Kosuge, 1963]
- Nipponaphera iwaotakii Habe, 1961
- Salinator takii Kuroda, 1928
- Tristichotrochus iwaotakii Azuma, 1961
