= Madoka Sasaki =

Japanese zoologist

Madoka Sasaki (佐々木 望, Sasaki Madoka; 1883–1927) was a Japanese zoologist, who is known for his work on the cephalopods of Japan, as well as other groups such as salamanders.

== Academic career ==
Sasaki was Professor of Zoology in the Fishery Department of the College of Agriculture at Tohoku Imperial University, Sapporo, Japan.

Sasaki died in 1927 and his major work A monograph of the dibranchiate cephalopods of the Japanese and adjacent waters was published posthumously in 1929. It was based largely on his studies of the cephalopod collections of the Zoology Department of the "Tokyo University Museum", many of which he collected himself.

== Honors ==
The species Sebastodes sasakii, Octopus sasakii and Sepia sasakii are among the taxa that bear names that honour Sasaki.
