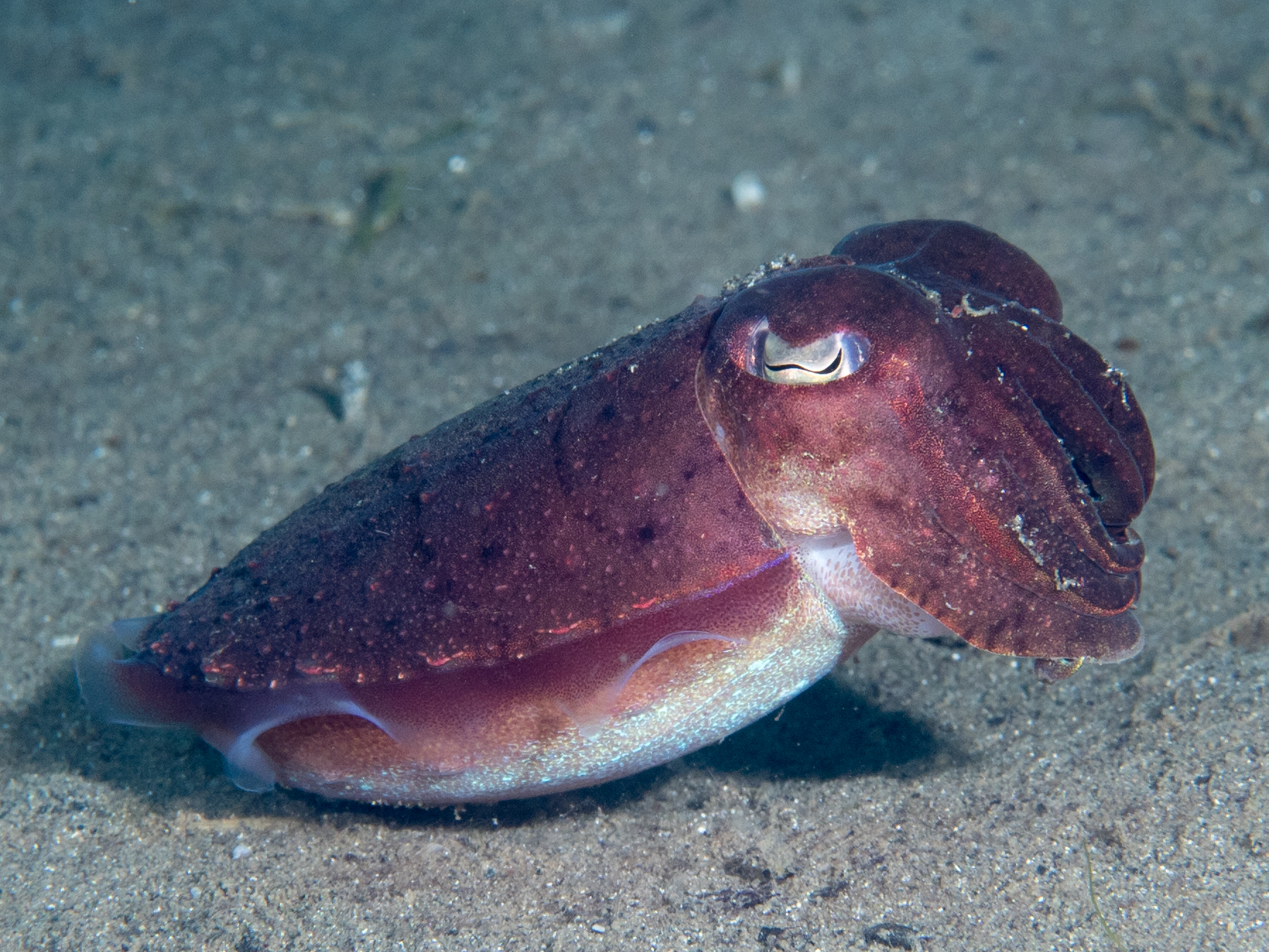

Conservation status
- Data Deficient (IUCN 3.1)

Scientific classification
- Kingdom: Animalia
- Phylum: Mollusca
- Class: Cephalopoda
- Order: Sepiida
- Family: Sepiidae
- Genus: Acanthosepion
- Species: A. esculentum

Binomial name
- Acanthosepion esculentum (Hoyle, 1885)

Synonyms
- Sepia (Platysepia) esculenta (Hoyle, 1885); Sepia esculenta (Hoyle, 1885)

= Acanthosepion esculentum =

Species of cuttlefish

Acanthosepion esculentum, commonly referred to as the golden cuttlefish, is a species of cuttlefish belonging to the family Sepiidae. This cuttlefish is carnivorous and found along the coasts of the Western Pacific Ocean. Acanthosepion esculentum lives a seasonally migratory lifestyle and, in recent decades, faced environmental challenges due to over-fishing and habitat disruption of the species.

== Description ==
A. esculentum has a very short lifespan, with the oldest individual documented in a recent study being 152 days old. Its mantle can reach up to 180 millimetres (7.1 in) in length.

== Diet and habitat ==
Acanthosepion esculentum inhabits coastal waters from South Korea, China, and Japan in the north to the Philippines in the south. It is found at depths of 10–100 metres (33–328 ft). This species of cuttlefish requires water temperatures around 20℃ and sandy, sediment-layered sea floors in which to hunt. In its benthic environment, the golden cuttlefish maintains a carnivorous diet.

The golden cuttlefish, like many cuttlefish species, uses its beak to break its prey into many smaller pieces for digestion, rather than ingesting the prey whole. As a juvenile, it feeds on shrimp, crabs, and other small crustaceans. Once the golden cuttlefish reaches its fully-developed size, it continues to feed on shrimp and crabs while also eating fish and showing cannibalistic behavior. Fish such as Engraulis japonius and crustaceans such as Squilla oratoria are known prey species. As an adult, 50% of the golden cuttlefish's diet is crustaceans, while the other 50% consists of juvenile cuttlefish and various fishes. A. esculentum plays a key role in its marine ecosystem as a variety of whales, seals, birds, and fish all feed on this cuttlefish.

== Migration ==
Over the lifespan of a golden cuttlefish individual, it will migrate in a pelagic fashion, moving from deeper regions in the Western Pacific to shallower waters during the species’ mating season. The locations of the breeding and spawning grounds this species migrates to is determined by multiple factors including the given abundance of food, amount of microalgae, and objects along the sea floor that can house clusters of eggs.

== Mating and offspring ==
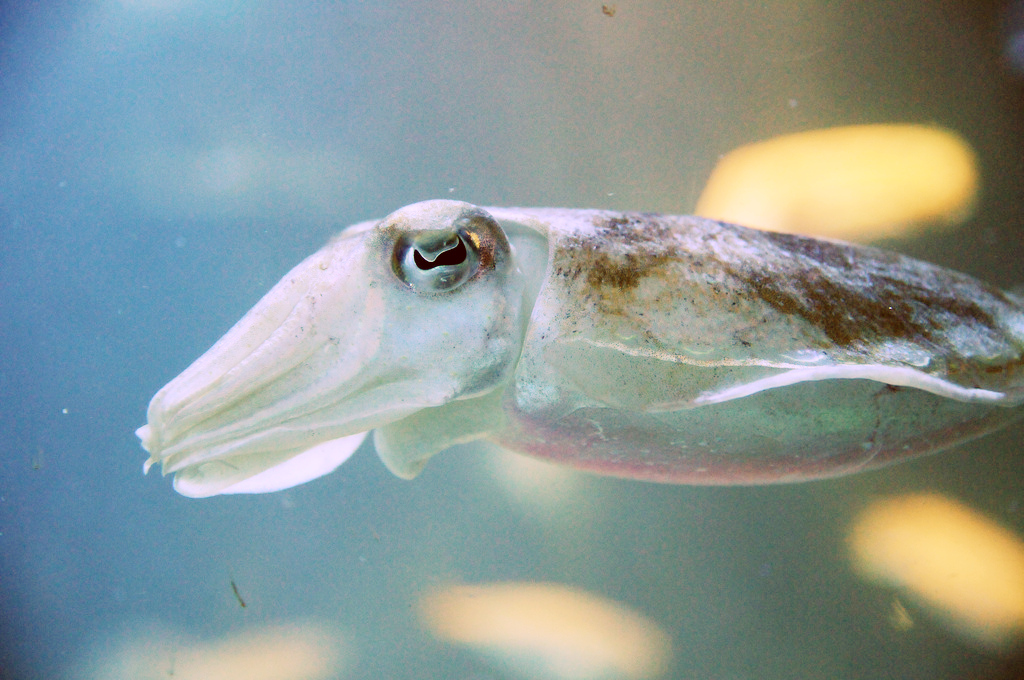

During mating, males deliver a packet of sperm using a specially adapted tentacle to the female's buccal membrane. Females of the species lay clusters of membrane-bound eggs which sink to the sediment floor of their spawning/breeding areas, where they rest on structures such as sunken wood and microalgae. On average, female Acanthosepion esculentum produce between 23 and 65 clusters of eggs at a time. Golden cuttlefish are born with all their biological structures fully formed, with the ability to school, hunt, and migrate.

Male sperm competition in the golden cuttlefish plays a large role in reproduction. After maturity, males perform a variety of visual displays to attract a potential mate. Females often mate with more than one male during each mating season and retain the sperm from the various mates use for later fertilization. This leads to sperm competition between males to fertilize the females’ eggs. Male cuttlefish use their arms to remove the packets of sperm from other males off the buccal membrane of the female they intend to mate with, in an effort to ensure their sperm will fertilize the egg rather than the stored sperm within the female's buccal cavity.

Golden cuttlefish predominantly breed from the months of March to July, with breeding periods varying by region. In the Tokyo Bay, the golden cuttlefish has been known to spawn between March and June, while data on populations in the Yellow Sea show spawning occurring from June to July.

== Threats ==
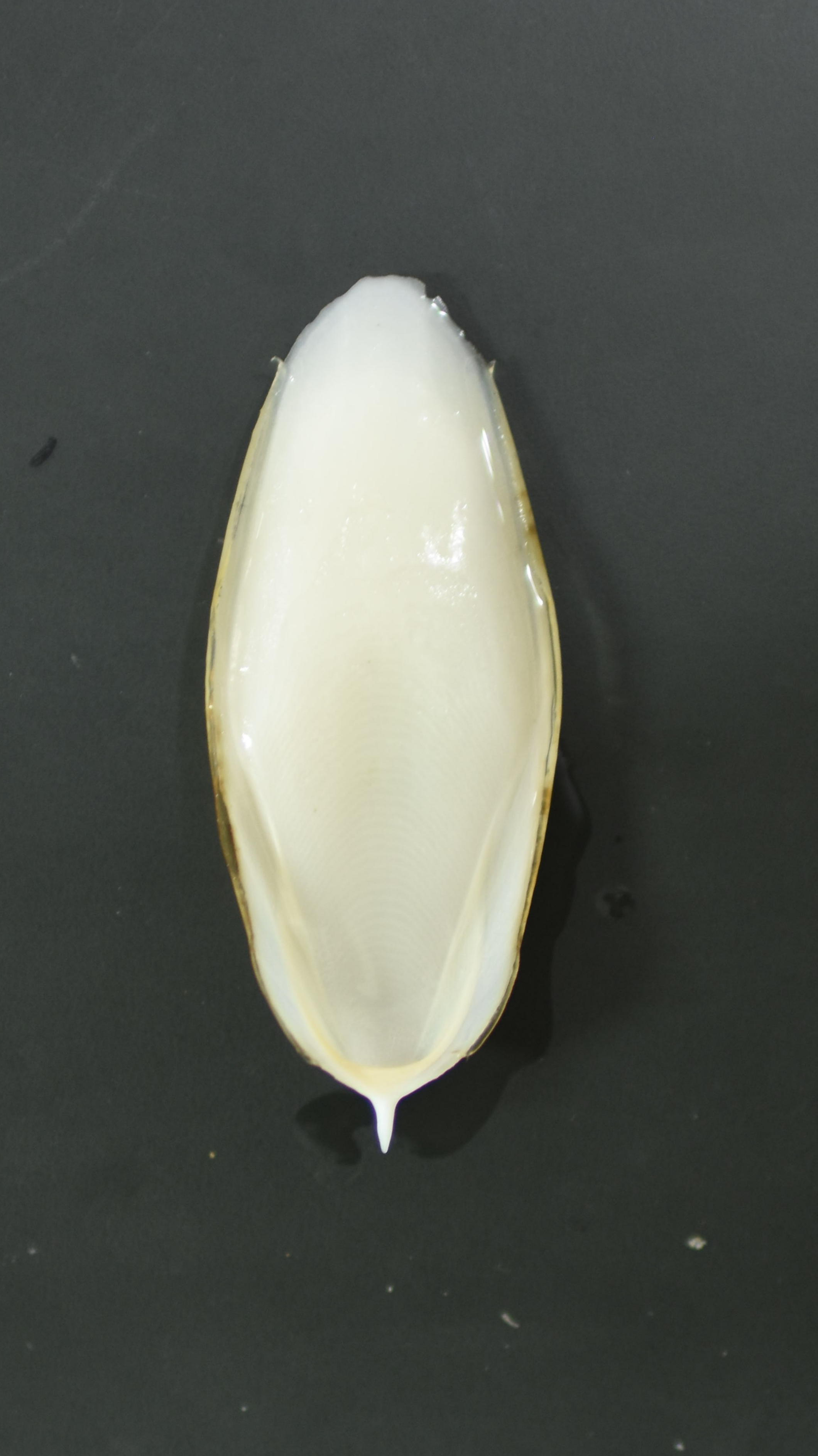
The cuttlebone of Acanthosepion esculentum

In recent decades, Acanthosepion esculentum has faced a decline in population due to commercial fishing by Chinese, Japanese, and South Korean companies. Until the 1990s, Sepiella maindron was the most fished cuttlefish in the region, but was later surpassed by A. esculentum in popularity. The golden cuttlefish is harvested for both the meat from its mantle and for the medicinal properties of its cuttlebone in Chinese medicine. Because golden cuttlefish live on the ocean floor, fishing techniques such as cage fishing and trawling are used to catch them, which further disrupt their habitat.

Along with the impacts of commercial fishing, climate change has disrupted the migratory patterns and population health of A. esculentum. Due to raised temperatures in the colder waters this species winters in, the golden cuttlefish's journey to coastal breeding waters is occurring earlier than in recent decades. Given that many of the individuals have yet to reach full maturity, there are now higher mortality rates and worsened environments for breeding for the species.

== Conservation ==
In response to the decline in the regional populations of Acanthosepion esculentum, provinces in Northern China have taken measures to help promote and boost population numbers. Annual releases of captive-raised golden cuttlefish have been started and the placement of artificial structures for A. esculentum’s eggs to attach to have been placed on the sea floor off of the Chinese coast.
