= Grimpoteuthis boylei =

Boyle's flapjack octopod

Conservation status
- Least Concern (IUCN 3.1)

Scientific classification
- Kingdom: Animalia
- Phylum: Mollusca
- Class: Cephalopoda
- Order: Octopoda
- Family: Grimpoteuthidae
- Genus: Grimpoteuthis
- Species: G. boylei

Binomial name
- Grimpoteuthis boylei Collins, 2003

Species of octopus

Grimpoteuthis boylei is a species of octopus known from only ten individuals.

== Description ==
Grimpoteuthis boylei is a pelagic umbrella octopus, also known as the "dumbo octopus" because it bears a resemblance to the title character of Disney's film Dumbo, 1941. It is large, reaching a total length of 470 millimeters (18.5 inches). Like all cirrates, it has a web over its arms and cirri between its suckers, as well as fins for swimming and a hard shell inside its mantle. G. boylei has a shell shaped like a saddle.

== Habitat ==
Grimpoteuthis boylei lives at abyssal depths of the Northeast Atlantic Ocean, more specifically the Porcupine Abyssal Plain and the Porcupine Seabight. It lives near two other members of its genus, Grimpoteuthis challengeri and Grimpoteuthis discoveryi. The octopus is found between 4,190 and 4,848 meters deep (13,747 to 15,905.5 feet).

It is likely that G. boylei is demersal. While population size is unknown, G. boylei is classified as "Least Concern" because it lives at such extreme depths.

== Characteristics ==
Grimpoteuthis boylei has a life span between 3 and 5 years. The octopus has small fins that are used to propel themselves in order to move as well as to crawl on the seafloor and to capture prey.

== Feeding ==
Grimpoteuthis boylei search for prey as they hover over the sea floor. They commonly search for polychaete worms, pelagic copepods, isopods, amphipods, and other crustaceans for food. They capture their prey by pouncing, then swallowing their prey whole.

== Threats ==
Facing few threats from humans, the main threats that the octopus faces are from predators such as sharks and predatory cephalopods. Grimpoteuthis boylei have chromatophore cells which allow for them to change colors such as red, white, pink, brown, or camouflage in order to blend into their surroundings and avoid predators.
