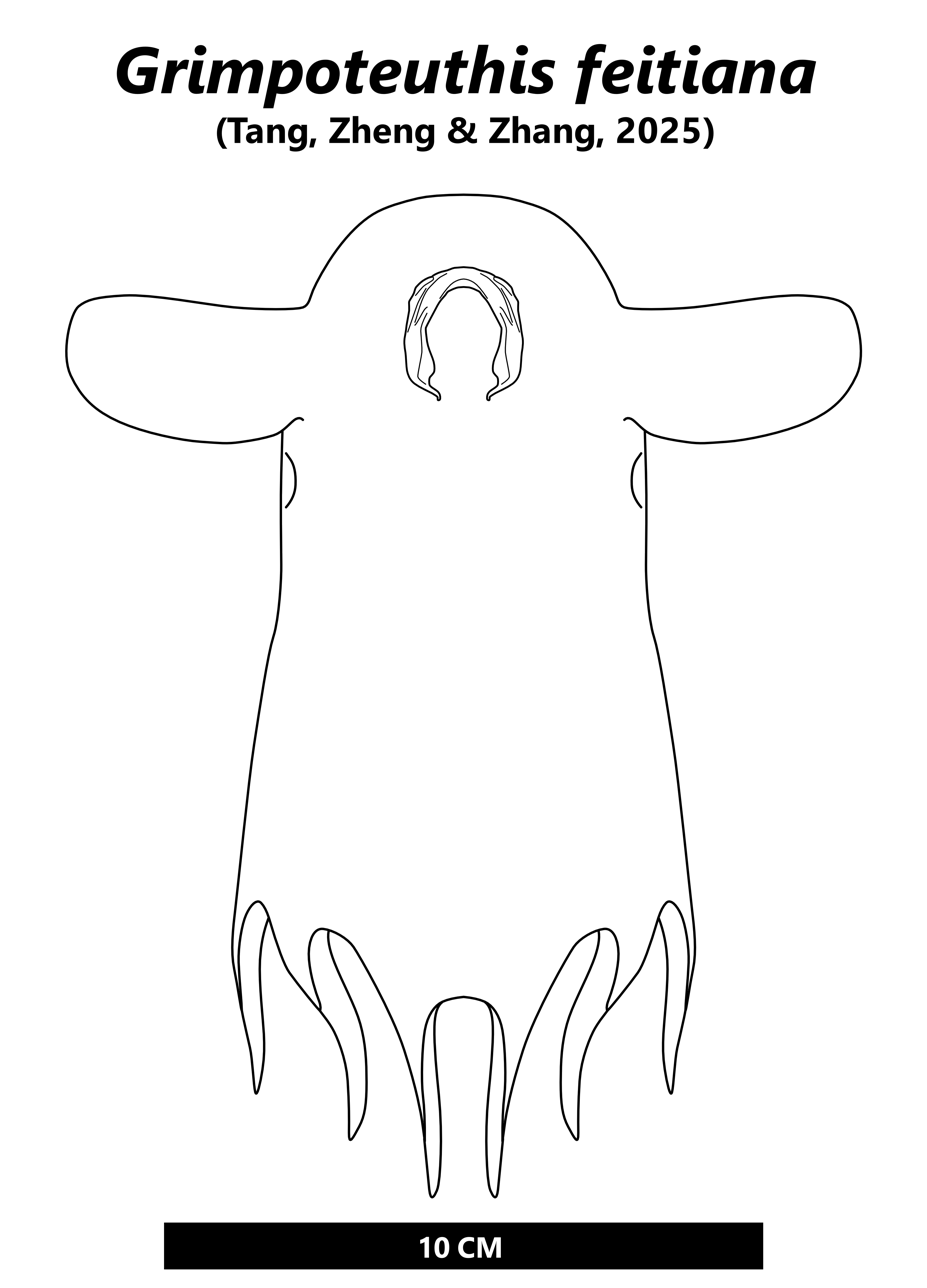
- Simple line drawing of Grimpoteuthis feitiana showing the position of the internal shell

Scientific classification
- Kingdom: Animalia
- Phylum: Mollusca
- Class: Cephalopoda
- Order: Octopoda
- Family: Grimpoteuthidae
- Genus: Grimpoteuthis
- Species: G. feitiana

Binomial name
- Grimpoteuthis feitiana Tang, Zheng & Zhang, 2025

= Grimpoteuthis feitiana =

Species of octopus

Grimpoteuthis feitiana is a small species of dumbo octopus from the Western Pacific known from a single specimen collected at the Caroline Seamount at a depth of 1,240 m (4,070 ft) in 2017; it was subsequently described as a new species in 2025.

The specific name 'feitiana' references 'feitian', a goddess from the Chinese Mogao Cave Culture known for her graceful aerial dancing, resembling the way dumbo octopuses move underwater in their natural habitat.

== Description ==
The singular collected specimen (holotype) of G. feitiana has a total length of 212.6 mm (8.37 in) and a mantle length of 43.6 mm (1.72 in), making the mantle about one-fifth of the total length of the animal. It weighs in at 36.5 g (1.29 oz).

Grimpoteutis feitiana can be most prominently distinguished from other members of its genus by its slightly concave shell saddle surface, whereas most other Pacific cirrates show either a more convex or flattened shell. The shell is U-shaped, and its outer wing faces are flat and almost parallel; a spike-like projection is retracted slightly inwards relative to the wings. The small internal shell supports the musculature of the mantle fins.

=== Anatomy ===
The body of G. feitiana is semi-gelatinous, bell-shaped and elongated towards the antero-posterior end; the mantle itself is almost as long as it is wide and rounded posteriorly. The head, however, is wider than the mantle, and like almost all modern octopodiformes, G. feitiana exhibits head-mantle fusion, where there is no visible divide between the mantle and head region. The short and free funnel (siphon) is enveloped by the narrow pallial aperture, the opening of the mantle cavity crucial for respiration. The fins of this species are moderately long and more than half as wide as long; the narrow but muscular fin bases are attached between the eyes and the apex of the mantle. The eyes themselves are quite large.

The arms are long but not quite equal in length; the ventral arm pair is the shortest, while the dorsal arm pair appears to be the longest. Like all cirrate octopuses, this species also exhibits a prominent inter-brachial web, or the membrane spanning between the arms. Due to the age of the specimen and damage taken during collection, it is not possible to tell if web nodules are present. Web nodules are fleshy, wart-like potrusions embedded in the webbing between the arms. Extending from the mouth opening to the tips of the arms are uniserial, moderately sized suckers, about 66-69 per arm. The ones towards the tips are smaller. Starting from between sucker 5 or 6 up until the end of each arm, two pairs of cirri extend that gradually increase in size until they reach the tip of the arm. Cirri are small, slender, hair- or filament-like structures found in some octopodiformes that serve mainly as sensory structures.

The specimen was coloured orange-red while alive; the oral surfaces of the arms, the inter-brachial web, and the posterior mantle, as well as the fins, were darker. The cirri and suckers exhibited a warm white. Inconspicuous ring-like markings surrounded the eye and extended from the eye to the base of the arms.

The upper beak of this species is tall with a deep hood and a convex crest; the rostrum is pointed downwards, tapering to the tip with curved edges. The lower beak is similarly tall, but the hood is only moderately long. The projecting rostrum is blunt. The radula exhibits a homodont dentition arranged in seven rows. The buccal bulb, the muscular structure which houses the beak and radula, is large and red and exhibits two rings of glandular structure as well as large salivary papillae, projections inside the mouth that deliver secretions from the salivary glands, flanked by dark, thick labial palps and central conical odontophores, the cartilage which underlies and supports the radula. Attached to the buccal mass are also the small anterior salivary glands; the posterior glands are absent. The oesophagus is short and leads to a stomach much smaller than the buccal bulb. The caecum, an extension of the stomach where initial digestion and nutrient absorption begin, is one whorl and as large as the stomach. The rectum is short. Both the ink sac and anal flaps are absent.

The small olfactory organs are ovoid in shape; these organs are located behind the eyes near the mantle edge. They contain ciliated sensory cells that detect dissolved chemicals in the water, functioning much like a "nose" for smelling. The optic lobe, crucial for complex vision and processing visual input, is rounded; the anterior half of each of the white bodies is penetrated by a single broad bundle of nerve fibres. However, the visual capabilities of cirrate octopuses are unknown.

== Behaviour and ecology ==
Little is known about the behaviour and ecology of this species due to only one specimen ever having been observed in the wild. It was discovered at a depth of 1,240 m (4,070 ft) in the mesopelagic zone of the Western Pacific at the Caroline Seamount with a water temperature of 2.31 °C (36.16 °F). It was observed lying on the sea floor with its arms bent over the sea surface and its fins spread out. The animal appears to have responded quickly under the artificial illumination of the ROV that observed it, which caused it to start swimming by flexing its arms to generate upward thrust and flapping its fins.

== Genetics and phylogeny ==
An analysis of the genome of G. feitiana suggests that the genes in deep-sea octopus experience a relaxation of purifying selection relative to those of shallow-water taxa, as those accumulate more nonsynonymous mutations. Purifying selection, also called negative selection, is a type of natural selection that removes harmful genetic variations from a population. When this process is relaxed, it means that the removal of harmful mutations from a population becomes weaker, allowing slightly harmful or less optimal genetic variants to persist and even accumulate. These mutations in mitochondrial genes have been interpreted as being signals to adapt to a certain environment; in deep-sea species this might be associated with specific adaptations to low temperatures, low oxygen levels, darkness and high hydrostatic pressure, like in the case of G. feitiana. The total length of the mitogenome is 16,242 bp in Grimpoteuthis feitiana.

The following cladogram is based on a phylogenetic analysis which was inferred from the majority of Bayesian inference and Maximum likelihood methods;

- Cirrata
  - Opisthoteuthoidea
    - - Grimpoteuthidae
        - - - Grimpoteuthis feitiana
            - Grimpoteuthis sp.
          - Grimpoteuthis sp. ON367810
        - Luteuthis dentatus
      - Opisthoteuthidae
        - - - Opisthoteuthis massyae
            - Opisthoteuthis grimaldii
          - Opisthoteuthis sp.
        - Opisthoteuthis californiana
    - Cirroctopodidae
      Cirroctopus glacialis
  - Cirroteuthoidea Cirroteuthidae
    - - - Cirroteuthis muelleri
        - Cirrothauma sp.
      - Cirrothauma murrayi
    - Cirrothauma magna
