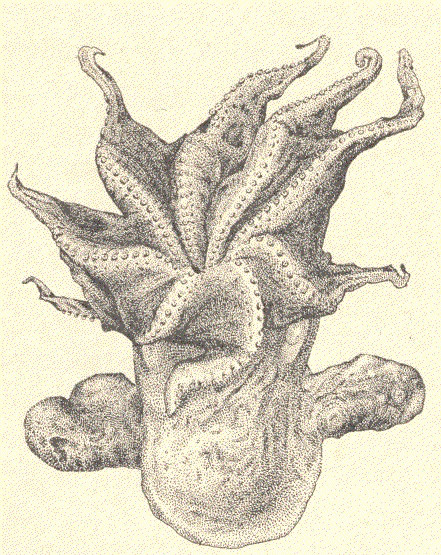
- Possible G. umbellata specimen collected by the Prince of Monaco's yacht Princess Alice. This specimen's true identification is uncertain.

Conservation status
- Data Deficient (IUCN 3.1)

Scientific classification
- Kingdom: Animalia
- Phylum: Mollusca
- Class: Cephalopoda
- Order: Octopoda
- Family: Grimpoteuthidae
- Genus: Grimpoteuthis
- Species: G. umbellata

Binomial name
- Grimpoteuthis umbellata P. Fischer, 1884

Synonyms
- Grimpoteuthis umbellatus

= Grimpoteuthis umbellata =

Species of octopus

Grimpoteuthis umbellata, is known from three specimens and is the type species of Grimpoteuthis. The three original specimens were collected during 1883 by the French research vessel Le Talisman, on one of the first deep-sea voyages conducted by France, and described by malacologist Paul Henri Fischer.

== Distribution ==
The three specimens were taken from different locations (described as a large, medium sized, and small specimen); the largest was found off the Azores, and two others (a medium sized and small specimen) smaller two were found off Morocco. The largest was found at a depth of 2,235 meters.

== Description ==
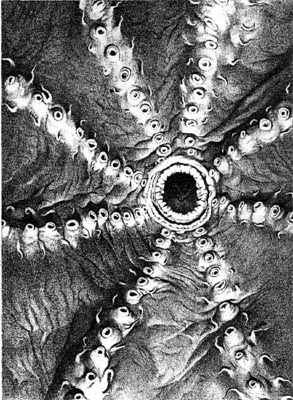
Grimpoteuthis umbellata, closeup of suckers and cirri around the mouth from the now missing 'medium sized' specimen.

Of the three specimens originally used to describe the species, only two (the large and medium sized specimens) were actually members of Grimpoteuthis (the smallest specimen being either a juvenile Grimpoteuthis or an Opisthoteuthis).

Only one of these two is still extant and is the Lectotype of the species, since it is in poor condition, standard measurements such as total length and mantle length are unknown for the species.

This single extant specimen was recently redescribed, and while the original size couldn't be determined due to damage, the arms are up to 111 mm long revealing. The Lectotype specimen lacks a radula and posterior salivary glands, has 8 lamellae per, up to 65-70 suckers per arm, cirri commencing between the 3^{rd}-5^{th} suckers, and web nodules between the 27^{th}-31^{st} sucker on each arm, and uniquely shaped beaks. This combination of traits is most similar to Grimpoteuthis discoveryi, to which is likely the senior synonym (the bathymetric range and distribution of the two also matching), however some differences in the lower beak shape, and lack of molecular data make it hard to confirm the synonymy.

The lack of radula and posterior salivary glands, as well as the cirri commencement point, gill lamellae counts and other features, differentiate the species from other northeast Atlantic Grimpoteuthis such as G. wuelkeri, G. boylei and G. challengeri.
