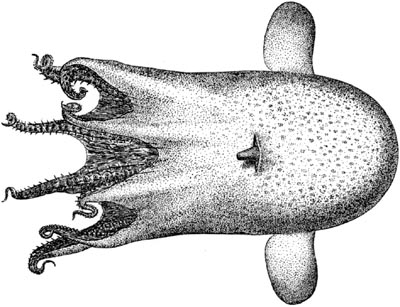
- G. plena

Conservation status
- Data Deficient (IUCN 3.1)

Scientific classification
- Kingdom: Animalia
- Phylum: Mollusca
- Class: Cephalopoda
- Order: Octopoda
- Family: Grimpoteuthidae
- Genus: Grimpoteuthis
- Species: G. plena

Binomial name
- Grimpoteuthis plena Verrill, 1885

Synonyms
- Cirroteuthis plena

= Grimpoteuthis plena =

Species of octopus

Grimpoteuthis plena is known from only one specimen, which cannot be easily separated from other species of Grimpoteuthis in the Atlantic Ocean. This species may be a senior synonym to Grimpoteuthis wuelkeri (but has fewer suckers), but the poor condition of the only known specimen (the holotype) hinders comparison. Grimpoteuthis plena, along with G. wuelkeri and G. discoveryi, may all be junior synonyms of G. umbellata, but this also cannot be resolved given the poor condition of the only known G. umbellata specimen.

== Description and habitat ==
Grimpoteuthis plena was found in the northwestern Atlantic Ocean, at 1,963 meters deep. Like other members of Grimpoteuthidae, it could be demersal or bentho-pelagic. Specifically, the single known specimen of G. plena was collected at a latitude of 37º 35'N and a longitude of 71º 18'W in the northwestern Atlantic Ocean, with other species of the same genus being found nearby. The single G. plena specimen was found in the year 1880 by Verrill.

The specimen's mantle reached 57 millimeters long, and its total length reached 185 millimeters. Some of its arms were longer than the others, with between 55 and 60 suckers per arm (largest suckers 2.5 millimeters in diameter). The octopus' cirri are short. Its fins are each 32 millimeters long. The eyes are small: each is 12 millimeters in diameter.
