= Cirroctopus antarctica =

Conservation status
- Least Concern (IUCN 3.1)

Scientific classification
- Kingdom: Animalia
- Phylum: Mollusca
- Class: Cephalopoda
- Order: Octopoda
- Family: Cirroctopodidae
- Genus: Cirroctopus
- Species: C. antarctica

Binomial name
- Cirroctopus antarctica Kubodera & Okutani, 1986

Synonyms
- Cirroctopus antarcticus; Grimpoteuthis antarctica

Species of octopus

Cirroctopus antartica is a species of deep-sea octopus known from only two specimens, both collected around the Antarctic Peninsula. Its shell is like the letter "U" in shape. It is possible, though not certain, that C. antarctica is a synonym of C. glacialis.
