= Grimpoteuthis abyssicola =

Conservation status
- Data Deficient (IUCN 3.1)

Scientific classification
- Kingdom: Animalia
- Phylum: Mollusca
- Class: Cephalopoda
- Order: Octopoda
- Family: Grimpoteuthidae
- Genus: Grimpoteuthis
- Species: G. abyssicola

Binomial name
- Grimpoteuthis abyssicola O'Shea, 1999

Species of octopus

Grimpoteuthis abyssicola, commonly known as the red jellyhead, is a species of small deep-sea octopus known from two specimens. The holotype specimen was a female collected on the Lord Howe Rise (central Tasman Sea off New Zealand), between 3154 and 3180 meters depth. A second specimen (a male) was collected on the continental slope of south-eastern Australia between 2821 and 2687 m depth.

The octopus has very delicate tissues, making it susceptible to damage by trawling nets. The arms and web are a deep maroon colour, while the body and head are nearly transparent.

The female type specimen had a mantle about 75 millimeters long, while its total body reached 305 millimeters long (the male specimen had a longer mantle length at 99 mm, but a shorter total length of 245 mm). G. abyssicola's internal shell is U-shaped, lacking any lateral prominences/shoulders, and with the ends of shell rounded, this shell shape is distinctive from other Grimpoteuthis (with the possible exception of Grimpoteuthis hippocrepium). This species can also be distinguished from other members of Grimpoteuthis due to the absence of both a radula and posterior salivary glands, how many suckers it has (up to 74 or 77 per arm on the known specimens), and where the arm cirri commence. On the holotype the first 6-8 suckers on each arm are small, then larger up to sucker 30-35, followed this are a further 30-35 suckers rapidly decreasing in size to the arm tip.

The species has three distinct ways of feeding. It can either obtain food through envelopment, entrapment, or cirri-generated current feeding. With cirri-generated current feeding possibly being present in the other two feeding styles as well.

Present records of this species are too few to assess its conservation status (but it is likely not threatened given its abyssal distribution).
