= Cirroctopus hochbergi =

Conservation status
- Endangered (IUCN 3.1)

Scientific classification
- Kingdom: Animalia
- Phylum: Mollusca
- Class: Cephalopoda
- Order: Octopoda
- Family: Cirroctopodidae
- Genus: Cirroctopus
- Species: C. hochbergi

Binomial name
- Cirroctopus hochbergi O'Shea, 1999

Species of octopus

Cirroctopus hochbergi (common name: Four-blotched umbrella octopus) is a cirrate octopus living between 800 and 1,070 meters deep off the coast of New Zealand. The species is known from 48 specimens. It is most similar to its sister taxon, Cirroctopus mawsoni; however, C. mawsoni's ventral pigmentation is lighter, and the two species have been found in very different areas (C. mawsoni is only known in waters near Antarctica).

This octopus lives near cold seeps and seamounts. It is theorized that it and all other cirrate octopuses live in the demersal zone.

== Description ==
The octopus has a pair of large, pale blotches under the eyes, and a matching pair of blotches where the fins meet the body. It is muscular and dark purple in colour.

== Threats ==
While C. hochbergi is not used by humans, it is often taken as bycatch. One of the greatest threats to the species is trawling, which damages its habitat. There are an estimated 250 to 1,000 mature individuals. C. hochbergi's population is currently decreasing, and it may be locally extinct in areas where it once was common.

Like other cirrates, it has a long lifespan and grows slowly, which could make it hard for the species to recover from declines in the population.
