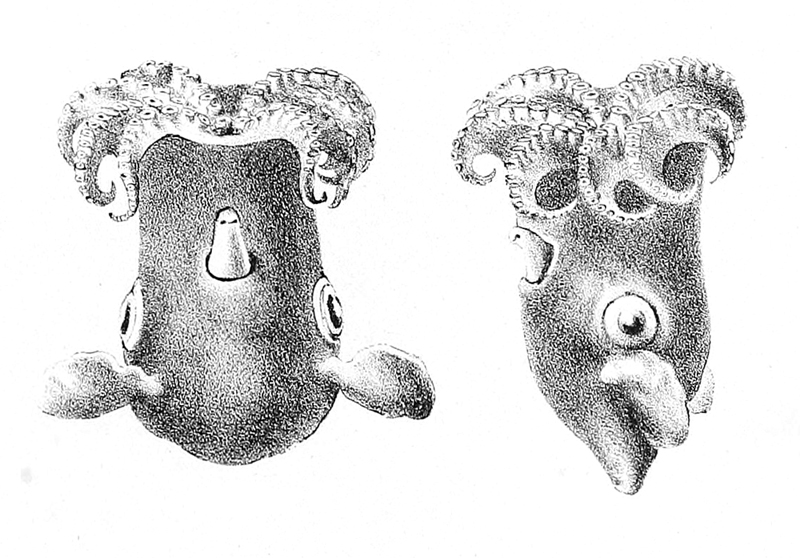
- Hoyle's drawing of G. meangensis, retouched.

Conservation status
- Data Deficient (IUCN 3.1)

Scientific classification
- Kingdom: Animalia
- Phylum: Mollusca
- Class: Cephalopoda
- Order: Octopoda
- Family: Grimpoteuthidae
- Genus: Grimpoteuthis
- Species: G. meangensis

Binomial name
- Grimpoteuthis meangensis Hoyle, 1885

= Grimpoteuthis meangensis =

Species of octopus

Grimpoteuthis meangensis is known from either one or two specimens, though the second may be of a completely different species. The first was damaged. Both were found by William Evans Hoyle within one year of each other, and no other animals of the species have been identified since 1886.

== Description and habitat ==
The type specimen, or original specimen, was found off the south Philippines, at a depth of 1,000 meters. Like other members of its family, Grimpoteuthidae, G. meangensis could be demersal. The second specimen was discovered 2,000 meters south of where the first specimen was found.

This octopus's mantle reaches 53 millimeters long, and it weighs at least 1,345 grams when wet. Every arm has between 60 and 70 suckers, which are small. Like other cirrates, G. meangensis has a web covering its arms to some degree; the web of G. meangensis covers the majority of its arms. The cirri on these arms are short.

The fins G. meangensis uses to swim almost equal its body length; its eyes are large. The shell within its body has a shape which differentiates it from other members of the genus Grimpoteuthis.
