= Grimpoteuthis tuftsi =

Conservation status
- Data Deficient (IUCN 3.1)

Scientific classification
- Kingdom: Animalia
- Phylum: Mollusca
- Class: Cephalopoda
- Order: Octopoda
- Family: Grimpoteuthidae
- Genus: Grimpoteuthis
- Species: G. tuftsi

Binomial name
- Grimpoteuthis tuftsi Voss and Pearcy, 1990

Species of octopus

Grimpoteuthis tuftsi is an octopus known from seven specimens.

== Description and habitat ==
The specimens were caught by bottom trawling in the Northeastern Pacific Ocean. This octopus was found 3,900 meters deep in the abyssal plain and on the continental slope. It is potentially a demersal species, which means it would live close to the seafloor.

The largest of the seven specimens was 475 millimeters in length. Its mantle is 102 millimeters. Each arm has between 63 and 75 suckers; of the suckers, the largest are 2.5 millimeters across. The suckers of Grimpoteuthis tuftsi aren't different sizes or shapes based on the sex of the specimen. Its shell is shaped somewhat like the letter "W".
