= Diodora tenuiclathrata =

Scientific classification
- Kingdom: Animalia
- Phylum: Mollusca
- Class: Gastropoda
- Subclass: Vetigastropoda
- Order: Lepetellida
- Family: Fissurellidae
- Genus: Diodora
- Species: D. tenuiclathrata

Binomial name
- Diodora tenuiclathrata (G. Seguenza, 1863)

Synonyms
- Diodora edwardsi (Dautzenberg & H. Fischer, 1896); †Fissurella tenuiclathrata G. Seguenza, 1863; Glyphis edwardsi Dautzenberg & Fischer H. 1896

Species of gastropod

Diodora tenuiclathrata is a species of sea snail, a marine gastropod mollusk in the family Fissurellidae, the keyhole limpets. The size of the shell reaches 13 mm. This species was found on the Porcupine Bank, northeast Atlantic Ocean, and at bathyal depths off the Azores.
