= Grimpoteuthis greeni =

Scientific classification
- Domain: Eukaryota
- Kingdom: Animalia
- Phylum: Mollusca
- Class: Cephalopoda
- Order: Octopoda
- Family: Grimpoteuthidae
- Genus: Grimpoteuthis
- Species: G. greeni

Binomial name
- Grimpoteuthis greeni Verhoeff & O'Shea, 2022

Species of octopus

Grimpoteuthis greeni is a dumbo octopus found in deep waters off southern Australia. The species was initially described from three specimens (1 male and 2 female), with a further three specimens identified since then.

== Description ==
This Grimpoteuthis has moderately large and laterally placed fins. The arms have up to 60 suckers on males and 67 on females. The suckers are flanked by cirri (a pair of these finger-like projections located between each sucker), the longest being around 1.0 to 1.7 × the greatest sucker diameter. The webbing between the arms is terminated on the ventral edge of each arm by a fleshy projection ('web nodule') positioned between suckers 19 to 24 on ventral arms and 24 to 28 on the dorsal arms. Internal shell U-shaped, with well-developed 'shoulders' at lateral corners and with the ends of the shell terminating in broad lobes, each lobe with concave indent and spike-like projection from the ventral edge.

Regarding the digestive system, the radula and posterior salivary glands are absent. The structure of the male and female reproductive system, as well as the internal shell, differentiate the species from Grimpoteuthis innominata.

== Reproduction ==
The female can spawn a single encased egg at a time, the ovoid casing has a dark brown color and dimensions 11.5 mm long and 7.2 mm wide. This egg is presumably attached to deep-sea corals as in other Grimpoteuthis with no parental care required, however the egg of this species is somewhat smaller than in other Grimpoteuthis.

== Distribution ==
This species has been collected from the upper to mid continental slope of southeastern Australia and the Great Australian Bight, over a bathymetric range 480 to 1993 meters.
