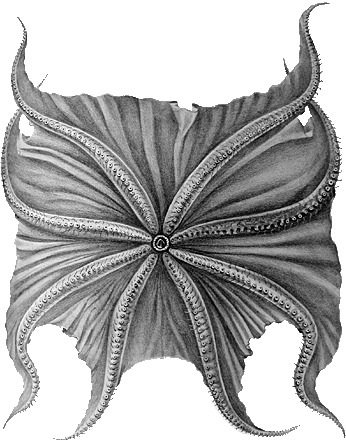
- Grimpoteuthis pacifica, oral.

Conservation status
- Data Deficient (IUCN 3.1)

Scientific classification
- Kingdom: Animalia
- Phylum: Mollusca
- Class: Cephalopoda
- Order: Octopoda
- Family: Grimpoteuthidae
- Genus: Grimpoteuthis
- Species: G. pacifica

Binomial name
- Grimpoteuthis pacifica Hoyle, 1885

Synonyms
- Cirroteuthis pacifica

= Grimpoteuthis pacifica =

Species of octopus

Grimpoteuthis pacifica is an octopus known from one badly damaged specimen. It is not completely described, and it is not easily separated from some other species of octopus. Nothing clearly differentiates G. pacifica from Grimpoteuthis hippocrepium except for its type locality.

== Description and habitat ==
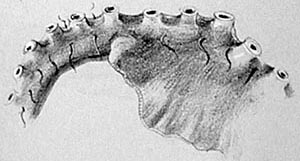
Arm of Grimpoteuthis megaptera

The specimen was captured off Papua New Guinea in the South Pacific Ocean in 1885, more specifically in the Coral Sea, where it was 4,500 meters (14,800 ft) below sea level. Grimpoteuthis pacifica is probably demersal.

Its fins are 55 millimeters (2.2 in) long. Each arm has 52 suckers, the largest of which are 2.5 millimeters (0.098 in) across. Its arms range in length from 130 to 170 millimeters (5.1 to 6.7 in) long, and its eyes are very large.

The octopus is a deep purple color, though some parts are paler.
