= Luteuthis =

Scientific classification
- Kingdom: Animalia
- Phylum: Mollusca
- Class: Cephalopoda
- Order: Octopoda
- Family: Grimpoteuthidae
- Genus: Luteuthis; O'Shea, 1999

Type species
- Luteuthis dentatus O'Shea, 1999

Species
- Luteuthis dentatus Luteuthis shuishi

Genus of octopuses

Luteuthis is a small genus of cirrate octopuses currently placed in the family Grimpoteuthidae. There are two species classified in this genus one from waters west of New Zealand and the other from the South China Sea.

== Taxonomy ==
Luteuthis are characterized by several unique features. The body is relatively elongate, extensively gelatinous and lacking areolar spots. The paired fins are laterally placed, and supported by a W-shaped internal shell with the shell wings bearing in-rolled margins and tapering to acute points. The arms are narrow and connected by simple webbing, there is no web nodule acting as a web attachment point. The suckers are crenulated (around the aperture opening) and are flanked by rows of short cirri (cirri about half as long as the sucker diameter). The gills resemble a "half-orange" and have seven lamellae. Luteuthis species have a well developed radula as well as palatine teeth on the palps flanking the radula, and the digestive gland is bilobed. As with other cirrate octopods, the ink sac is missing.

The genus was originally placed within its own family, Luteuthidae (O'Shea, 1999), as the presence of a radula was deemed very distinctive. However, it later became apparent that species of Grimpoteuthis also often have a radula and the two genera share other distinctive features (such as the optic nerves forming a single bundle each side of the head), with molecular data further supporting placement of Luteuthis, Grimpoteuthis and Cryptoteuthis in the family Grimpoteuthidae.

== Species ==
The two species in the genus Luteuthis are:

- Luteuthis dentatus O'Shea, 1999
- Luteuthis shuishi O'Shea & Lu, 2002
