= Vulcanolepas osheai =

Conservation status
- Naturally Uncommon (NZ TCS)

Scientific classification
- Kingdom: Animalia
- Phylum: Arthropoda
- Clade: Pancrustacea
- Class: Thecostraca
- Subclass: Cirripedia
- Order: Scalpellomorpha
- Family: Neolepadidae
- Genus: Vulcanolepas
- Species: V. osheai

Binomial name
- Vulcanolepas osheai (Buckeridge, 2000)

Synonyms
- Neolepas osheai; Volcanolepas osheai

Species of barnacle

Vulcanolepas osheai, commonly referred to as O'Shea's vent barnacle, is a stalked barnacle of the family Neolepadidae. This species is endemic to New Zealand.

== Habitat ==
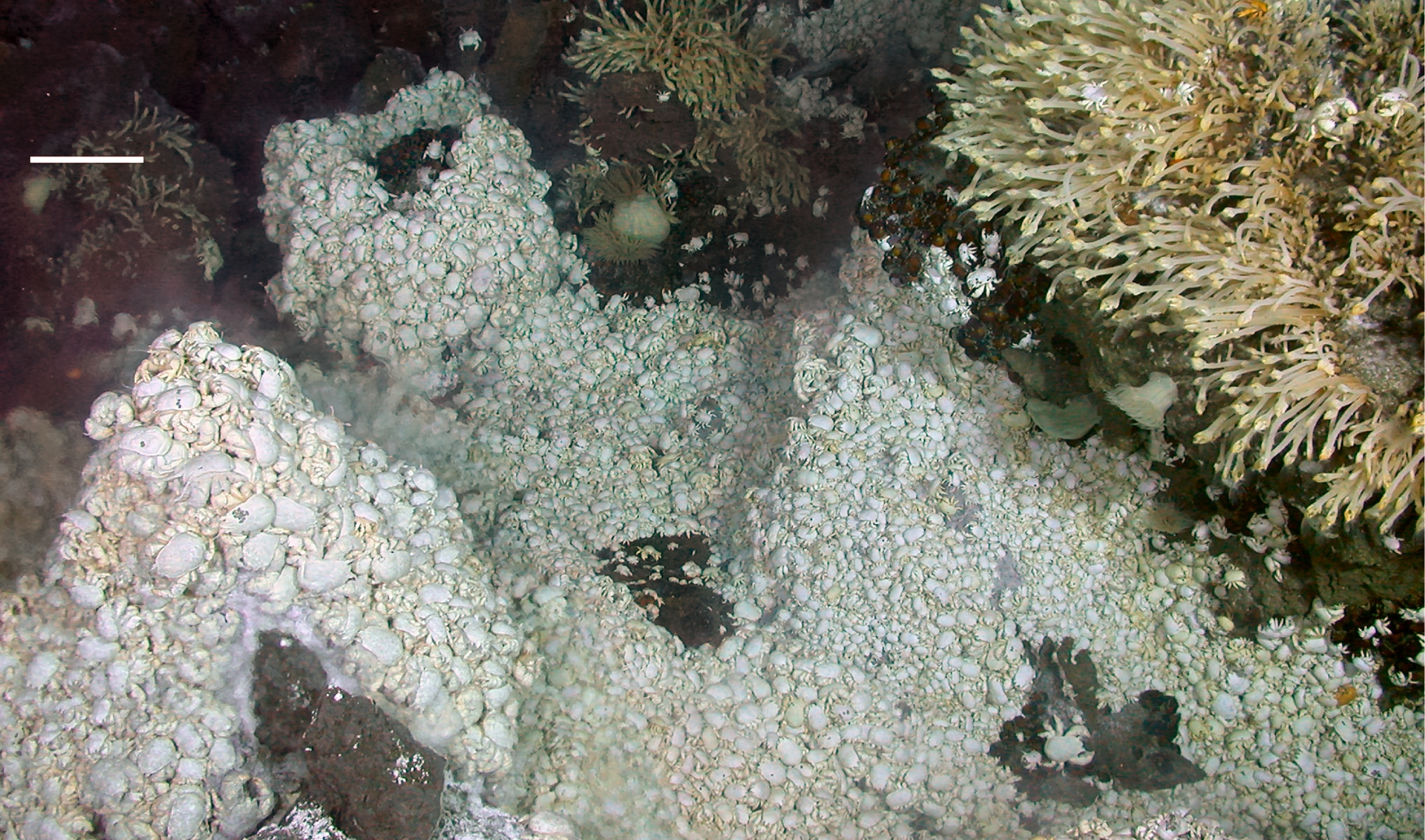
A dense fauna (Kiwa anomurans and Vulcanolepas-like stalked barnacles) near East Scotia Ridge vents

This species is a deep-sea stalked barnacle, found in the Brother's Caldera in the Havre Trough, near the North Island of New Zealand (approximately 700 kilometers off the coast of the Bay of Plenty). The barnacle is found at depths of 1290 to 1500 meters in depth around hydrothermal vents and active underwater volcanoes.

== Description ==
Vulcanolepas osheai has a peduncle (stalk) to capitulum (shell-casing) ratio of 5:1. The capitulum is made of approximately 8 calcareous plates, with a thin cuticle surrounding it, and is often stained black from manganiferous deposits due to the proximity to the hydrothermal vents. The peduncle is composed of many rows of small scales (less than 1 millimeter), usually twice as long as wide. In larger specimens, more than 100 rows of scales have been observed. The cirral setae of Vulcanolepas osheai are associated with filamentous bacterial epibionts, of the phylum Pseudomonadota (formerly Proteobacteria), although they are not endosymbiotic bacteria.

Isotopic analysis have suggested these barnacles feed on sulphur-oxidizing bacteria, or other planktonic larvae that feed on sulphur-oxidizing bacteria around the vents.

== Etymology ==
Vulcanolepas osheai is named after Dr. Steve O'Shea, who was curator of the National Institute of Water and Atmospheric Research in Wellington, New Zealand.
