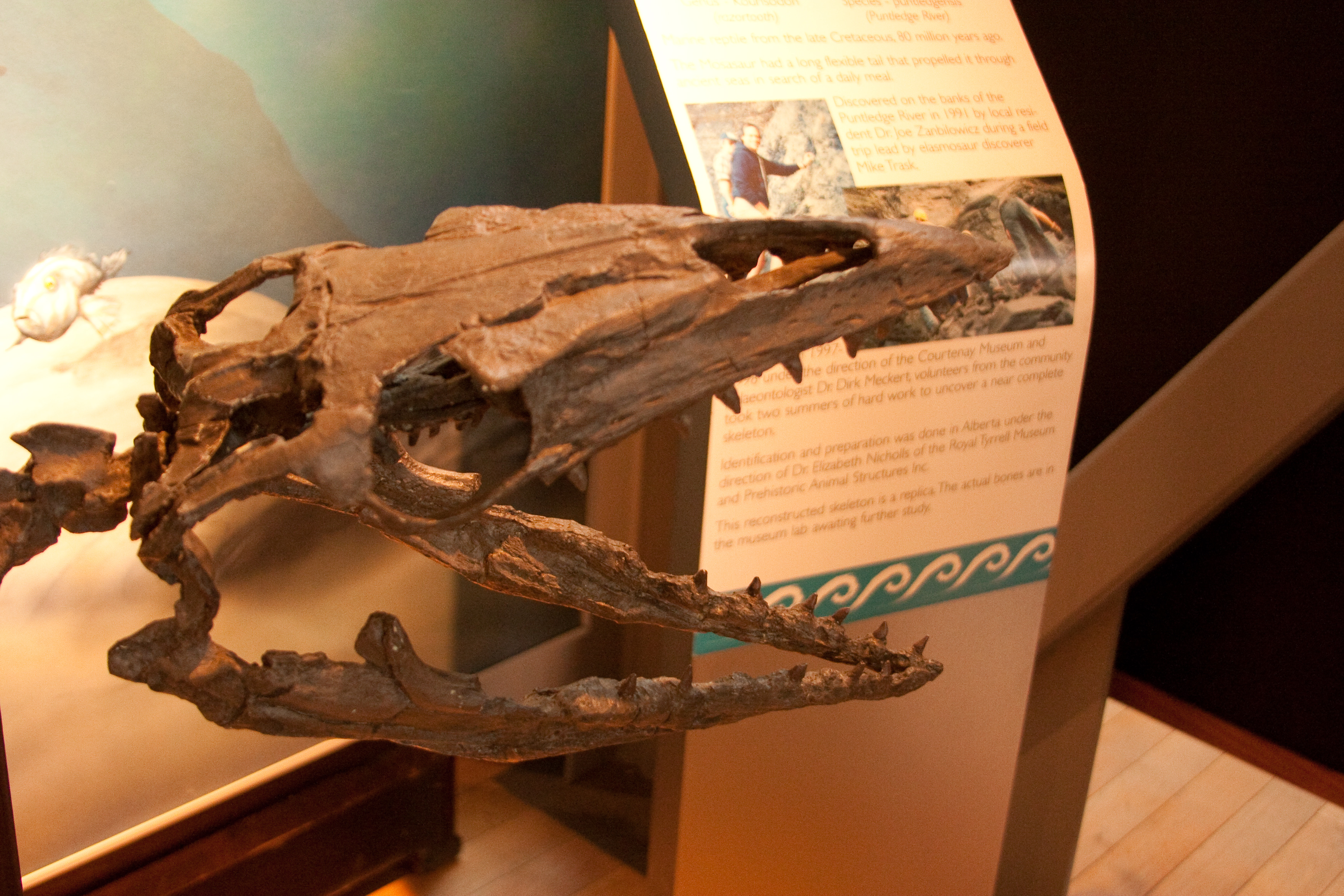
- Restored skull

Scientific classification
- Kingdom: Animalia
- Phylum: Chordata
- Class: Reptilia
- Order: Squamata
- Clade: †Mosasauria
- Family: †Mosasauridae
- Subfamily: †Mosasaurinae
- Genus: †Kourisodon; Nicholls and Meckert, 2002

Species
- K. puntledgensis Nicholls and Meckert, 2002 (type)

= Kourisodon =

Kourisodon Temporal range: Late Santonian - Late Maastrichtian 84–66 Ma

Extinct genus of lizards

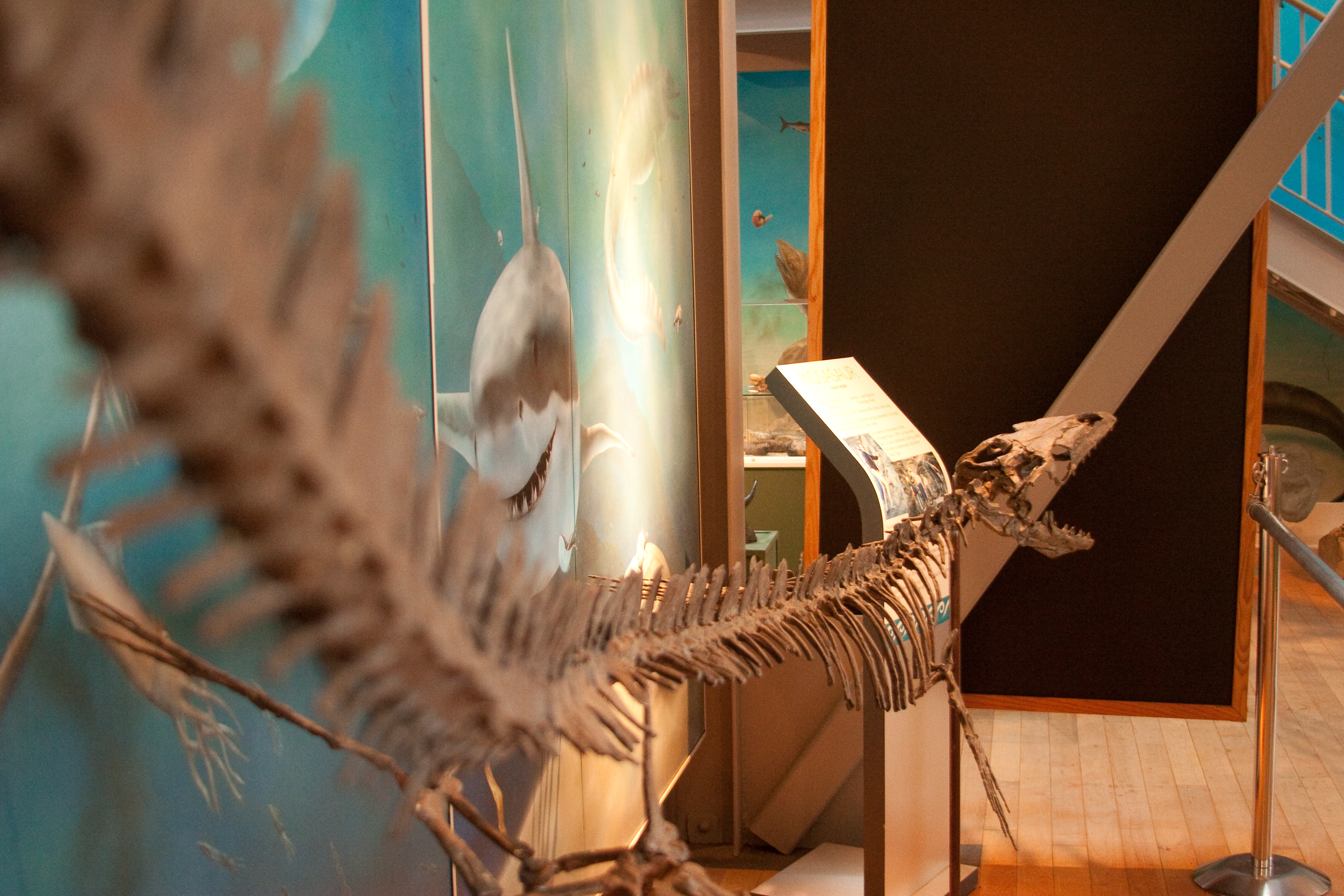
Restored skeleton

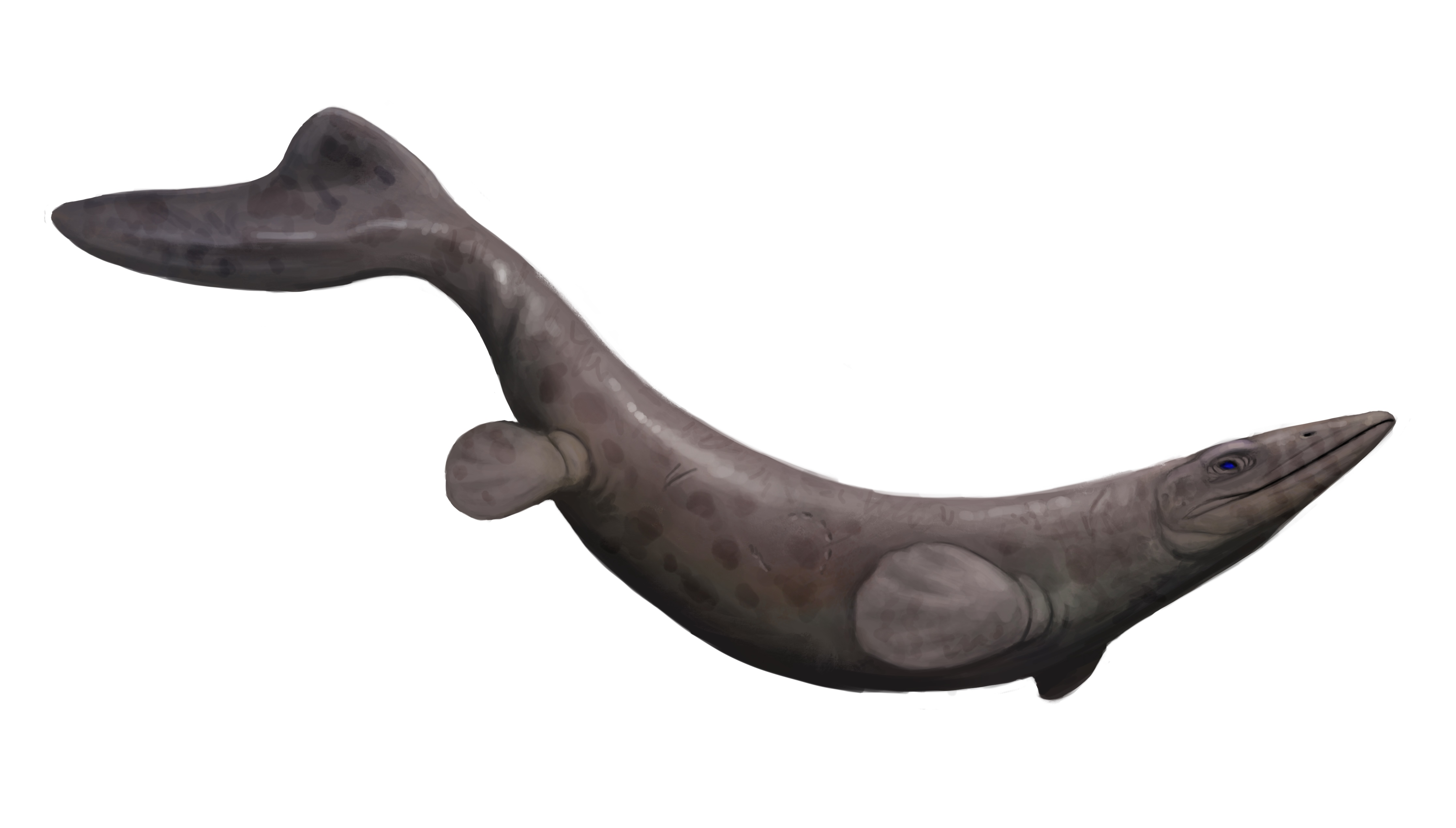
Life reconstruction

Kourisodon (from the Greek κουρίς kourís + ὀδών odon, "razor tooth") is an extinct genus of mosasaur. Fossils have been found from Vancouver Island in British Columbia, Canada, as well as from the Izumi Group of Japan. These finds date back to the late Santonian stage and the late Campanian to the late Maastrichtian, respectively, of the Late Cretaceous. Kourisodon was originally described as a member of the "Leiodontini", more recently as a "Clidastine".

== Distribution ==
Kourisodon puntledgensis is known from a single locality located in the Santonian Pender Formation along the banks of the Puntledge River (after which it was named). K. puntledgensis was a small mosasaur, with an estimated length of about 3.75 meters (around 12.3 feet). It shared its environment with a variety of Elasmosaurids, turtles, and other mosasaurs, although it seems that no polycotylids were present in its Pacific environment.

In 2005, a fragmentary skeleton from exposures of the Izumi Group on Shikoku Island, Japan, was assigned to Kourisodon sp. This specimen demonstrated longer maxillary teeth among other differences from K. puntledgensis, which the authors interpreted to mean that this individual belonged to a second species, although this new species has not yet been formally named. Other fragmentary remains from the Izumi Group have been tentatively assigned to K. sp., some of which represent juvenile animals.

A 12' 3" complete replica of the Puntledge River specimen is on display at the Canadian Fossil Discovery Centre in Morden, Manitoba.
