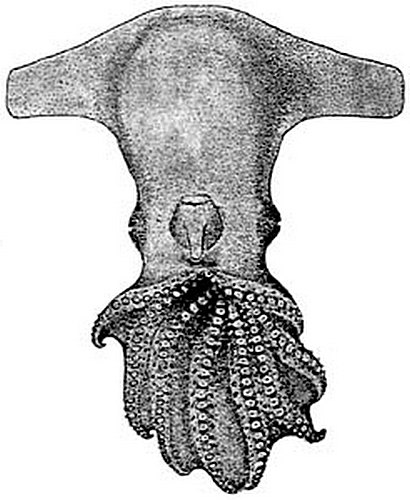

Conservation status
- Least Concern (IUCN 3.1)

Scientific classification
- Kingdom: Animalia
- Phylum: Mollusca
- Class: Cephalopoda
- Order: Octopoda
- Family: Cirroctopodidae
- Genus: Cirroctopus
- Species: C. mawsoni

Binomial name
- Cirroctopus mawsoni (Berry, 1917)

Synonyms
- Grimpoteuthis mawsoni

= Cirroctopus mawsoni =

Species of octopus

Cirroctopus mawsoni is a species of octopus known from only one specimen, which was collected by the Australasian Antarctic Expedition in the waters off Adélie Land between 530 and 550 meters deep. It was described by Samuel Stillman Berry as Stauroteuthis mawsoni, and dedicated to the leader of the expedition, Douglas Mawson.

Subsequently, Adolf Naef placed it as the type species of genus Cirroctopus. It may be synonymous with Cirroctopus glacialis.
