= Steve O'Shea =

New Zealand marine biologist

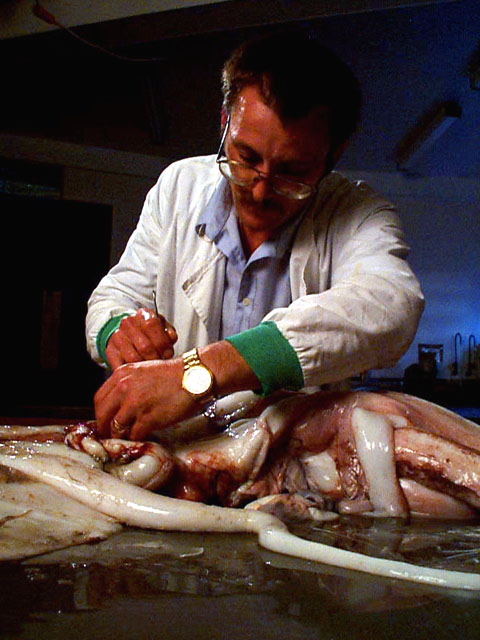
- O'Shea dissecting a 30-kilogram giant squid in 1999
- Born: 14 December 1965 (age 60); Auckland, New Zealand
- Scientific career
- Thesis: New Zealand Octopoda (Mollusca: Cephalopoda) : systematics (1998)

Steve O'Shea (born 14 December 1965 in Auckland, New Zealand) is a marine biologist and environmentalist known for his research on giant squid.

O'Shea obtained his degrees from Auckland university. He undertook a Bachelor of Science between 1984 and 1988. He graduated with an M.Sc. in 1990. The title of his 1998 doctoral thesis was New Zealand Octopoda (Mollusca: Cephalopoda) : systematics. He began work with the giant squid whilst working for the National Institute of Water and Atmospheric Research (NIWA) in New Zealand in 1996. He became the Director of the Earth and Oceanic Sciences Research Institute at the Auckland University of Technology in 2005, and was a Discovery Channel Quest Scholar. In 2009 he resigned from his Discovery Quest position to focus his research on coastal conservation, environmental matters and postgraduate supervision and teaching; despite this he has remained active in squid research, but is best known (in the popular press) for his involvement with large cephalopod taxa, particularly giant and colossal squids, and their preservation. In 2011 he resigned from his position at the Auckland University of Technology.

O'Shea has published extensively on cephalopods, fisheries, whale diet and shallow subtidal coastal ecology. He lived in Sydney during the 2010s, and currently resides in Paris, France where he runs a small editing business.

== Media appearances ==
O'Shea has appeared in over 13 documentaries on squid, whales and the oceans.

== Species named by Steve O'Shea ==
- Cirroctopus hochbergi O'Shea, 1999
- Cirroteuthis kirrilyae Verhoeff & O'Shea, 2025
- Grimpoteuthis abyssicola O'Shea, 1999
- Grimpoteuthis angularis Verhoeff & O'Shea, 2022
- Grimpoteuthis innominata O'Shea, 1999
- Grimpoteuthis greeni Verhoeff & O'Shea, 2022
- Luteuthis dentatus O'Shea, 1999
- Luteuthis shuishi O'Shea & Lu, 2002
- Octopus kaharoa O'Shea, 1999
- Opisthoteuthis chathamensis O'Shea, 1999
- Opisthoteuthis mero O'Shea, 1999
- Opisthoteuthis robsoni O'Shea, 1999
- Robsonella mernoo (O'Shea, 1999)
- Thaumeledone marshalli O'Shea, 1999
- Thaumeledone zeiss O'Shea, 1999
- Vulcanoctopus clyderoperi (O'Shea, 1999)
- Vulcanoctopus tegginmathae (O'Shea, 1999)

== Eponymy ==
Six marine species have been named after O'Shea to honour his contribution to science:

- Awhiowhio osheai (sponge)
- Brucerolis osheai (isopod)
- Calvetia osheai (bryozoan)
- Gonodactylellus osheai (mantis shrimp)
- Magnoteuthis osheai (squid)
- Vulcanolepas osheai (deep-sea barnacle)
