= Vulcanolepas =

Scientific classification
- Kingdom: Animalia
- Phylum: Arthropoda
- Class: Thecostraca
- Subclass: Cirripedia
- Order: Scalpellomorpha
- Family: Neolepadidae
- Genus: Vulcanolepas; Southward & Jones, 2003

Species
- Vulcanolepas buckeridgei Chan & Chang, 2018; Vulcanolepas fijiensis; Vulcanolepas osheai (Buckeridge, 2000); Vulcanolepas parensis Southward, 2005

Genus of crustaceans

Vulcanolepas is a genus of crustaceans belonging to the family Neolepadidae.

The species of this genus are found in Malesia and New Zealand.
