= Luteuthis shuishi =

Conservation status
- Data Deficient (IUCN 3.1)

Scientific classification
- Kingdom: Animalia
- Phylum: Mollusca
- Class: Cephalopoda
- Order: Octopoda
- Family: Grimpoteuthidae
- Genus: Luteuthis
- Species: L. shuishi

Binomial name
- Luteuthis shuishi O'Shea and Lu, 2002

Species of octopus

Luteuthis shuishi is a species of octopus that lives in the South China Sea, which is known only from one female specimen collected at a depth of 767 meters. It has short arms and is quite gelatinous. The octopus's total length is about 300 millimeters.
