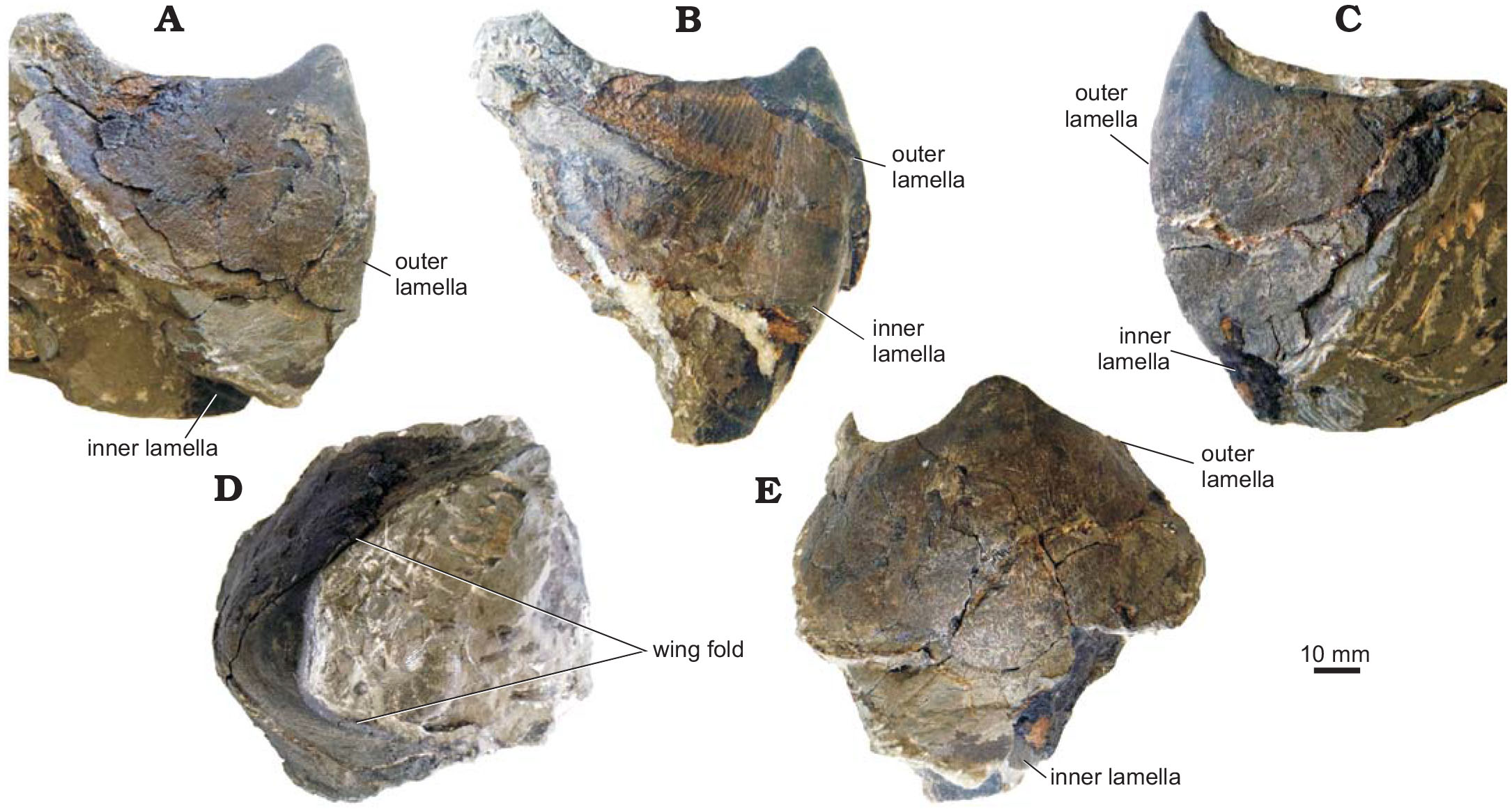
- A specimen of N. haggarti, originally assigned to N. hikidai

Scientific classification
- Kingdom: Animalia
- Phylum: Mollusca
- Class: Cephalopoda
- Order: Octopoda
- Suborder: Cirrata
- Genus: †Nanaimoteuthis; Tanabe et al., 2008

Type species
- †Nanaimoteuthis jeletzkyi Tanabe et al., 2008

Other species
- N. haggarti (Tanabe et al., 2008)

Synonyms
- Paleocirroteuthis Tanabe et al., 2008

= Nanaimoteuthis =

Nanaimoteuthis Temporal range: Cenomanian–Campanian

Extinct genus of octopus

Nanaimoteuthis is a genus of extinct octopus from the Late Cretaceous of Canada and Japan known only from isolated beaks. The species N. haggarti may have been among the largest cephalopods ever to live, with an estimated total length potentially between 6.6 and 18.6 metres (22 and 61 ft), though some researchers have expressed doubt on the upper end of the estimate.

== Discovery and naming ==
The type species, Nanaimoteuthis jeletzkyi, was named by Kazushige Tanabe and colleagues in 2008 and assigned it to the order Vampyromorphida. The holotype, CDM 2006.1.1, was discovered in the Pender Formation of the Nanaimo Group on Vancouver Island, Canada. Tanabe and colleagues named two other additional species of cirrate octopus, Paleocirroteuthis pacifica and P. haggarti, also known from the Pender Formation. Two additional species, N. yokotai and N. hikidai, were later named based on beak material from the Yezo Group of Hokkaido, Japan.

In 2026, Ikegami and colleagues synonymized Nanaimoteuthis and Paleocirroteuthis, with the former having priority, and reclassified the genus as a cirrate octopus based on the morphology of the beak. P. pacifica was suggested to be a junior synonym of N. jeletzkyi, while P. haggarti was reclassified as the other species of the genus, N. haggarti. The formerly referred species N. hikidai was reinterpreted as a junior synonym of N. haggarti, and N. yokotai was identified as an indeterminate species within the genus, as the latter does not preserve a lower jaw to compare with other species.

== Description ==
In previous publications, based on the proportions of extant vampire squids, the mantle length of N. yokotai was estimated to be around 54 centimetres (21 in), and that of N. hikidai around 70 centimetres (28 in). Furthermore, press releases and news articles cited an estimated total length of 1.1 metres (3 ft 7 in) for N. jeletzkyi from Hokkaido, and mantle length of 1.6 metres (5 ft 3 in), total length of 2.4 metres (7 ft 10 in) for N. hikidai.

In 2026, Ikegami and colleagues described isolated lower jaws of both species of Nanaimoteuthis, and measured the hood length of N. jeletzkyi at 39.6 mm (1.56 in) and N. haggarti at 86.4 mm (3.40 in) respectively, the latter of which is around 1.5 times larger than the hood length of the largest giant squid. They estimated the mantle length of N. jeletzkyi at 0.67–1.84 metres (2 ft 2 in – 6 ft 0 in), suggesting a total length of the animal of 2.8–7.7 metres (9 ft 2 in – 25 ft 3 in). They also estimated the mantle length of N. haggarti at 1.58 metres (5 ft 2 in) (based on Cirroteuthis muelleri) to 4.43 metres (14.5 ft) (based on Stauroteuthis syrtensis), leading to a total length range of 6.6 and 18.6 metres (22 and 61 ft). Other researchers doubted that the upper end of the length estimate was accurate, including Christian Klug, a cephalopod palaeontologist at the University of Zurich, who stated that the estimates were "quite extreme", and noted that there is a level of uncertainty about the animal due to only the jaws fossilizing.

== Paleoecology ==
Based on the wear patterns of the N. jeletzkyi and N. haggarti specimens, Ikegami et al. concluded that these cephalopods fed on animals with harder skeletons than their chitinous jaws. The authors ruled out abrasion (the destruction of rocks by coastal waves) as a possible cause, as all specimens studied were found in sediments formed in deep, low-energy conditions. Researchers suggested that huge finned octopuses, which they compared to the mythical kraken, competed with vertebrates in the North Pacific Ocean and were the top predators there during the Late Cretaceous epoch. The authors noted that, as a result of convergent evolution, cephalopods and vertebrates acquired jaws and lost their exoskeletons, leading to the appearance of apex predators in both groups. Other paleontologists not involved in the study, including Adiël Klompmaker and Jakob Vinther, stated that the fossils do not definitively prove that Nanaimoteuthis was an apex predator competing with and consuming larger vertebrates.
