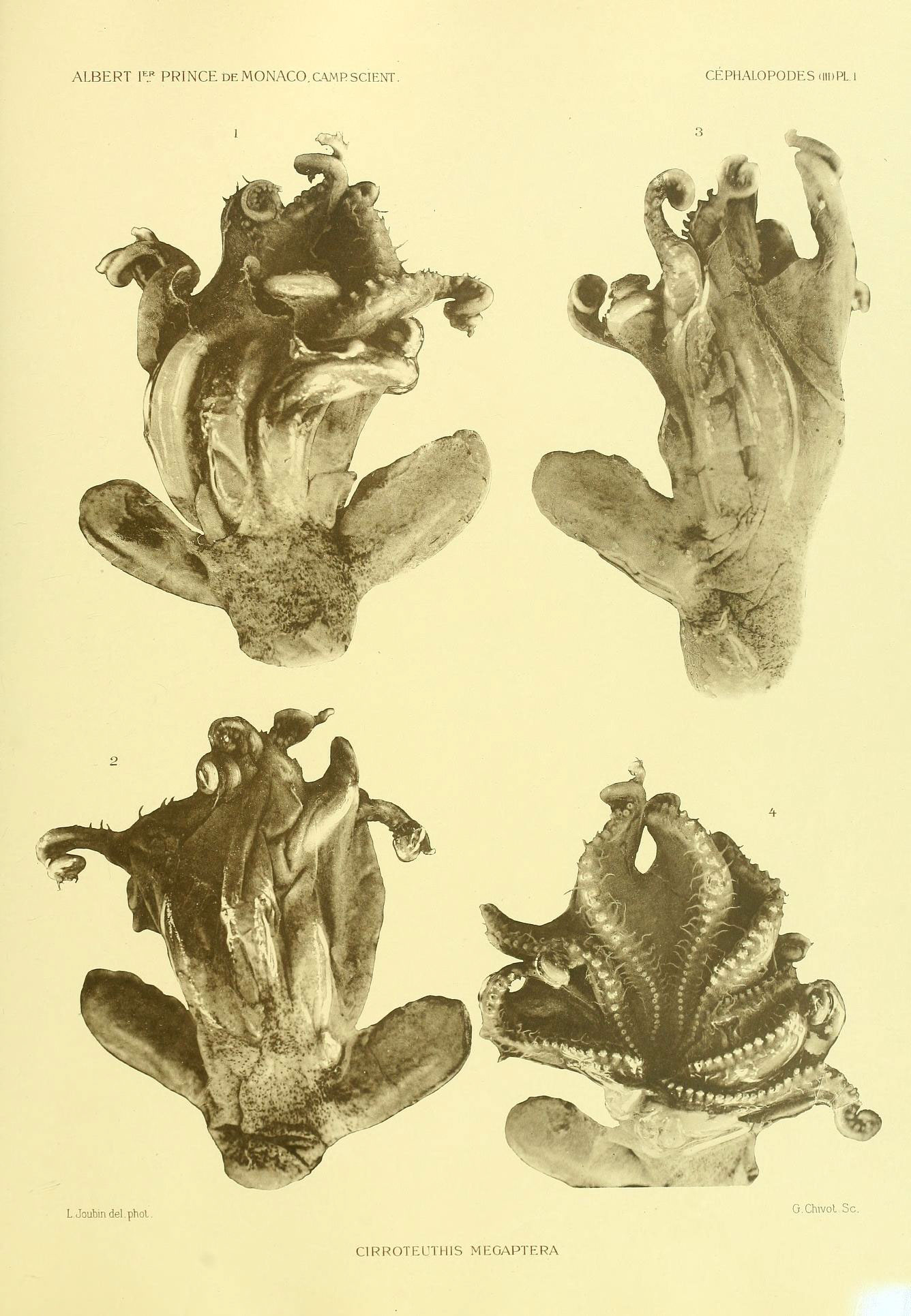
- Images of Grimpoteuthis megaptera from 1889.

Conservation status
- Data Deficient (IUCN 3.1)

Scientific classification
- Kingdom: Animalia
- Phylum: Mollusca
- Class: Cephalopoda
- Order: Octopoda
- Family: Grimpoteuthidae
- Genus: Grimpoteuthis
- Species: G. megaptera

Binomial name
- Grimpoteuthis megaptera Verrill, 1885

Synonyms
- Cirrhoteuthis megaptera; Cirroteuthis megaptera

= Grimpoteuthis megaptera =

Species of octopus

Grimpoteuthis megaptera is a species of octopus known from five specimens, collected by Addison Emery Verrill. Between two and three of these specimens may belong to different species.

== Description and habitat ==
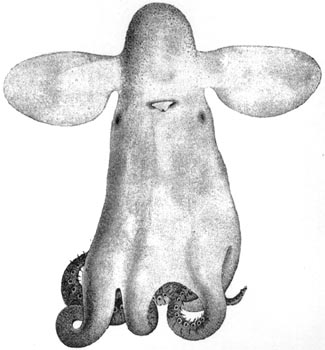
Grimpoteuthis megaptera

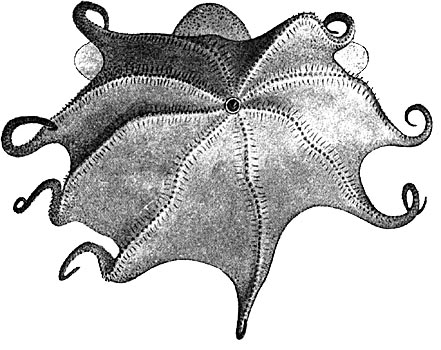
Oral view of G. megaptera

Grimpoteuthis megaptera lives in the Atlantic Ocean off of Martha's Vineyard in the United States. It was found 4,600 meters deep.

Its full length reaches 107 millimeters. Its eyes are small, as are its suckers and cirri. They can be distinguished between other species by its gill morphology, sucker count (52-70), and whether it has a radula and posterior salivary glands. The species exhibits high degrees of variability, which may be influenced by sexual dimorphism and preservation methods.

The octopus' arms and web, when viewed orally, are brown. G. megaptera has yellow suckers and a blue-white mantle and fins. The mantle is spotted with irregular brown-purple markings.
