= Grimpoteuthis imperator =

Scientific classification
- Domain: Eukaryota
- Kingdom: Animalia
- Phylum: Mollusca
- Class: Cephalopoda
- Order: Octopoda
- Family: Grimpoteuthidae
- Genus: Grimpoteuthis
- Species: G. imperator

Binomial name
- Grimpoteuthis imperator Ziegler & Sagorny, 2021

Species of octopus

Grimpoteuthis imperator, also known as the Emperor Dumbo octopus, is a species of deep-sea octopus in the family Grimpoteuthidae. The species is known from a single male specimen found in the Emperor Seamounts in the north Pacific off the coast of Japan in 2021. It was found at depths of 3900–4400m. The species was described using non-invasive methods such as CT scan and 3D imaging to preserve the only known specimen but to still be able to describe the species.

== Initial research ==
The single cirrate specimen was collected in the North Pacific Ocean during scientific cruise SO-249 BERING (R/V SONNE) using a chain bag dredge. When discovered, the animal was dead and was immediately transferred to a bucket of cold seawater. Several small tissue samples were collected from a single damaged arm. These tissue samples were then placed inside small plastic vials of fixative.

It has been suggested that the species lives close to the sea floor, as the web between the tentacles is shorter than in species known to float free in the water column. Presumably a longer web would constitute a hindrance to movements on the bottom.
