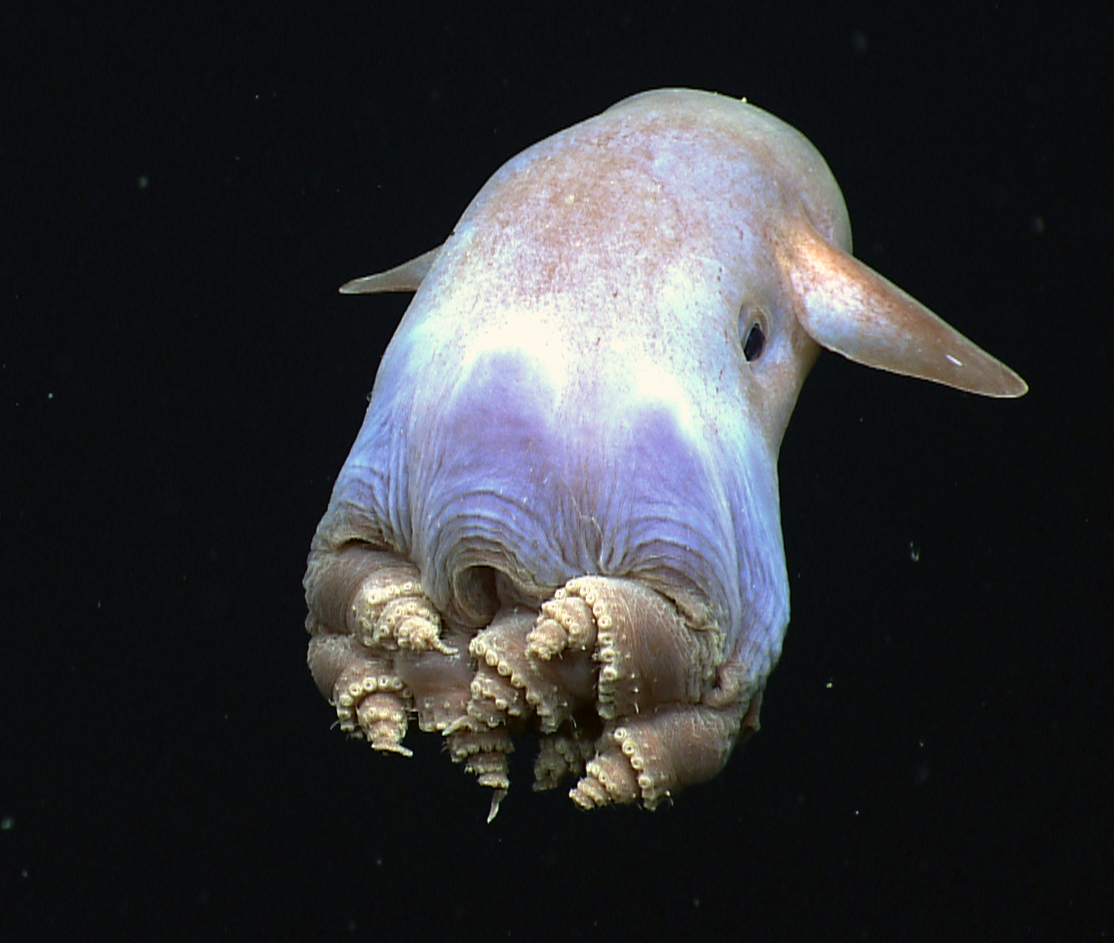

Scientific classification
- Kingdom: Animalia
- Phylum: Mollusca
- Class: Cephalopoda
- Order: Octopoda
- Family: Grimpoteuthidae
- Genus: Grimpoteuthis; Robson, 1932

Type species
- Grimpoteuthis umbellata (P. Fischer, 1884)

Species
- 17, see text

Synonyms
- Enigmatiteuthis O'Shea, 1999

= Grimpoteuthis =

Genus of cephalopods

Grimpoteuthis is a genus of pelagic cirrate (finned) octopods known as the dumbo octopus. The name "dumbo" originates from their resemblance to the title character of Disney's 1941 film Dumbo, having two prominent ear-like fins which extend from the mantle above each eye. There are 17 species recognized in the genus. The Dumbo octopus has a gelatinous body and uses fin propulsion for movement, which also helps it to conserve energy in its extreme deep-sea environment. These unique physical traits distinguish it from other octopuses, which primarily rely on jet propulsion. Prey include crustaceans, bivalves, worms and copepods. The lifespan of Grimpoteuthis species unknown, but is likely to be several years based on estimates from other cirrate octopods.

== Range and habitat ==
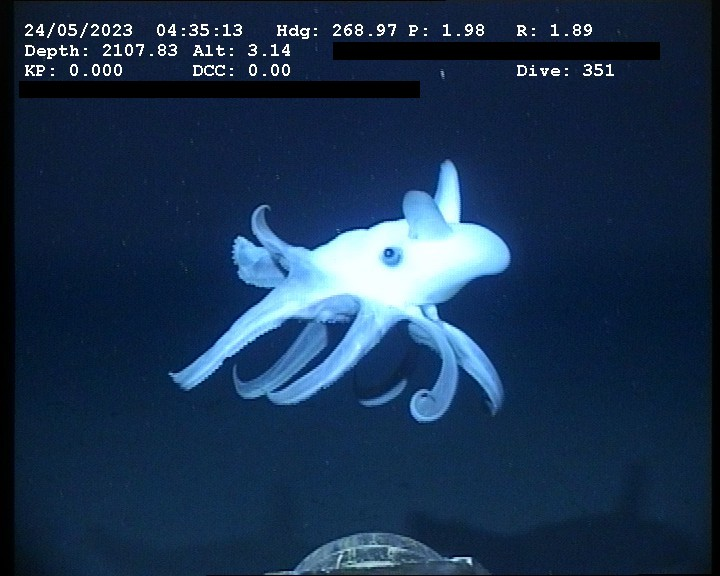
Grimpoteuthis 2108m off Guyana.

Species of Grimpoteuthis are assumed to have a worldwide distribution, living in the cold, abyssal depths ranging from 1,000–7,000 metres (3,300–23,000 ft). Specimens have been found off the coasts of Oregon, the Philippines, Martha's Vineyard, the Azores, New Zealand, Australia, California, Papua and New Guinea, Argentina, Uruguay, and in the Gulf of Mexico.

A fairly recent observation was on 21 June 2022 at 1,250 metres (4,100 ft) by the vessel Normand Ocean, which inspects drilling platforms with underwater drones; the vessel was examining chains and risers on the Aasta Hansteen platform outside Trøndelag, Norway. Another recent observation as of 2023 was on 24 May 2023 at 2108meters, this time in Guyana by the vessel Far Samson, which also uses underwater drones.

Further to this, the most recent known recorded observation was on 5th March 2025 by the Vessel "Boka Falcon" with a Workclass Remotely Operated Vehicle working at a depth of 960m in the Gulf Of Guinea approximately 65km South West of Abidjan, Ivory Coast. Two separate sightings approximate 20 minutes apart were observed.

Dumbo octopuses are the deepest living octopuses known, with some specimens captured or observed at hadal depths. One Grimpoteuthis specimen was captured 60 kilometres (37 mi) southeast of Grand Cayman at 7,279 metres (23,881 ft), but this depth is uncertain (as the specimen may have been captured while the net was descending to this depth).

In 2020, Grimpoteuthis was spotted 6,957 metres (22,825 ft) deep in the Java Trench, confirming the hadal distribution of this genus.

== Species and taxonomy ==
As noted below, many species collected on the Challenger expedition were initially classified in the genera Cirroteuthis and Stauroteuthis. Several species formerly classified as Grimpoteuthis were later moved to genera Cirroctopus and Opisthoteuthis. A new family, Grimpoteuthididae (alternatively spelled Grimpoteuthidae), has been proposed to accommodate Grimpoteuthis and those of genera Enigmatiteuthis, Cryptoteuthis, and Luteuthis. The persistent confusion and disparity about the taxonomy of these species has been attributed to the poor quality and limited number of specimens available for study.

Species name	Reference	Geographic range	Depth range (meters)	Taxonomic notes
Grimpoteuthis abyssicola	O'Shea (1999)	Tasman Sea (off New Zealand and southeastern Australia)	2821–3180m	Known from two specimens.
Grimpoteuthis angularis	Verhoeff & O'Shea (2022)	(off New Zealand)	628 m	Known from a single specimen. Internal shell form distinct from others in genus.
Grimpoteuthis bathynectes	Voss & Pearcy (1990)	North Pacific (Tufts and Cascadia abyssal Plains, off Oregon)	3932m	
Grimpoteuthis boylei	Collins (2003)	Northeast Atlantic (Porcupine and Madeira abyssal plains)	4845–4847m	
Grimpoteuthis challengeri	Collins (2003)	Northeast Atlantic (Porcupine abyssal plain)	4828–4838m	
Grimpoteuthis discoveryi	Collins (2003)	Northeast Atlantic	2600–4870m	
Grimpoteuthis feitiana	Tang, Zheng & Zhang, 2025	Caroline Seamount, western Pacific Ocean	1240 m	Known from one specimen
Grimpoteuthis greeni	Verhoeff & O'Shea (2022)	Southern Australia	480–1993m	Known from three specimens.
Grimpoteuthis hippocrepium	Hoyle (1904)	East Pacific (off Malpelo Island)	3334m	Previously assigned to genus Stauroteuthis; known from a single, "sadly mutilated" individual according to Hoyle. The internal shell form is similar to G. abyssicola.
Grimpoteuthis imperator	Ziegler & Sagorny (2021)	Emperor Seamounts, North Pacific	3913–4417m	Known from a single specimen.
Grimpoteuthis innominata	O'Shea (1999)	South Pacific (east of New Zealand)	2000m	Alternatively classified as Enigmatiteuthis
Grimpoteuthis meangensis	Hoyle (1886)	West Pacific (off Meangis Islands, near Philippines)	925 m	Previously assigned to genera Cirroteuthis and Stauroteuthis
Grimpoteuthis megaptera	Verrill (1885)	Northwest Atlantic (southeast of Martha's Vineyard)	4600m	Previously assigned to genus Cirroteuthis
Grimpoteuthis pacifica	Hoyle (1886)	South Pacific (off Papua New Guinea)	4500m	Previously assigned to genus Cirroteuthis
Grimpoteuthis plena	Verrill (1886)	Northwest Atlantic	2000m	Previously assigned to genus Cirroteuthis
Grimpoteuthis tuftsi	Voss & Pearcy (1990)	North Pacific (Tufts and Cascadia abyssal plains off Oregon)	3900m	
Grimpoteuthis umbellata	Fischer (1883)	North Atlantic (off Morocco, Canary Islands, and the Azores)	2235m	Previously assigned to genus Cirroteuthis
Grimpoteuthis wuelkeri	Grimpe (1920)	Northeast and northwest Atlantic	2055m	

== Movement, characteristics, and food supply ==
Observations of animals in the Atlantic reveal that Grimpoteuthis often rest on the seafloor with the arms and web spread out and uses its arms to slowly crawl along the seafloor. When disturbed, the webbing and arms are contracted to propel the animal off the seafloor and using the mantle fins for rapid locomotion.

The cushiony cartilage that can be found in the proximal position of the fin of Grimpoteuthis is responsible for acting as a support for the thick muscles that allow for rapid locomotion.

Although it has been suggested that species of Grimpoteuthis are capable of jet-propulsion (while swimming using the fins), this has since been deemed unlikely.

Feeding behavior has not been directly observed in Grimpoteuthis, but presumably is similar to Opisthoteuthis which can trap small prey items in the webbing (either by enclosing the prey in the arm webbing or between the webbing and the seafloor) and then use the cirri (fingerlike projections along the arms) to move food to the mouth. Known prey items (from dissected animals) include benthic polychaetes, benthopelagic copepods, amphipods and isopods.

== Breeding ==
The cirrate octopuses are classified as 'continuous spawners': Females carry multiple eggs in various stages of maturation, and only lay one or two eggs at a time, with no seasonality in spawning (however, most of these aspects of reproductive biology have only been confirmed in Opisthoteuthis, not Grimpoteuthis). Mating in cirrate octopuses has never been observed, and unlike other octopuses, members of Cirrata lack a hectocotylus for the transfer of sperm packets. The Grimpoteuthis male uses its large suckers to pass sperm packets, each within an operculum, directly into the female's mantle cavity. The female will then store the sperm and uses it to fertilize her eggs when she is ready to lay them. Cirrate octopus eggs are large and have a tough casing surrounding the chorion (not found in other octopuses), which solidify on contact with the cold seawater. Grimpoteuthis in particular attach their eggs to deep sea corals (octocorals).

Unlike other octopuses, the female cirrate octopus does not guard or incubate the eggs. Grimpoteuthis hatchlings emerge as "fully competent" juveniles with all of the sensory and motor features to survive on their own.

Sexual dimorphism between males and females is less noticeable and consistent in Grimpoteuthis compared to other cirrate octopuses (such as Opisthoteuthis). In some species (e.g., G. bathynectes and G.. discoveryi), the males have enlarged suckers relative to the females, but no such enlargement is found in other Grimpoteuthis species.

== Threats ==
Species of Grimpoteuthis face few direct threats from humans largely due to living at depths of 1,000 meters (3,300 ft) and below. Natural predators of cirrate octopuses include large teleost fish and sharks, and even marine mammals such as sperm whales and seals, but these are mostly predators of other cirrate genera. Grimpoteuthis has only been recorded in the stomach contents of a shark.

The Grimpoteuthis do not have an ink sac (as is the case with all cirrate octopuses). Furthermore, the cirrate octopuses lack innervated chromatophores and therefore are not capable of changing color (despite some unreferenced statements to the contrary). How cirrate octopuses escape or avoid predators is largely unknown.
