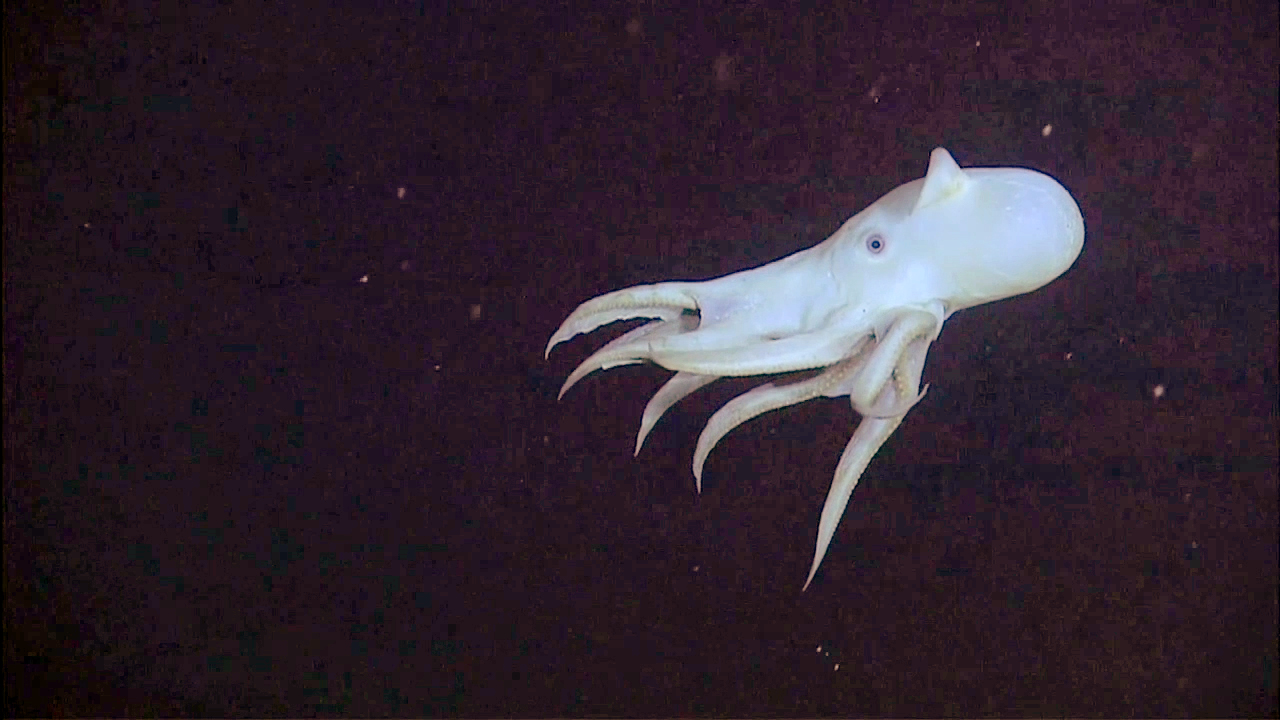

Conservation status
- Least Concern (IUCN 3.1)

Scientific classification
- Kingdom: Animalia
- Phylum: Mollusca
- Class: Cephalopoda
- Order: Octopoda
- Family: Grimpoteuthidae
- Genus: Grimpoteuthis
- Species: G. bathynectes

Binomial name
- Grimpoteuthis bathynectes Voss and Pearcy, 1990

= Grimpoteuthis bathynectes =

Species of octopus

Grimpoteuthis bathynectes is a deepwater species of Grimpoteuthis (Dumbo) octopus first described in 1990. It is known from 13 specimens.

== Description ==
Grimpoteuthis bathynectes in general form is distinguished from other Grimpoteuthis species by a suite of characteristics. Each of the dorsal arms have 47–58 suckers, with the suckers slightly larger and more globular in males (more tubular shaped in females). The pairs of cirri start between the third and fourth sucker, and at greatest length the cirri are roughly equal to the sucker diameter.

The internal shell (fin support) is roughly U-shaped, its ends flattened with small spikes. The octopus lacks a radula and posterior salivary gland (features found in some Grimpoteuthis), and has seven to nine gill lamellae on each gill. The mantle and head are gray, posterior edges of the fins are reddish brown the inside of the arm webbing (oral surface) is dark purple to reddish brown.

The diet and behavior of G. bathynectes has not been recorded, but is presumably similar to others in its genus.

== Habitat ==
G. bathynectes has only been collected from Tufts Abyssal Plain and Cascadia Abyssal Plain of the northeastern Pacific Ocean, from depths of 2800m to 4000 m.
