= Pender Formation =

Geologic formation in British Columbia, Canada

- Stratigraphic range: Cretaceous
- Type: Formation

Location
- Region: British Columbia
- Country: Canada

The Pender Formation is a geologic formation in British Columbia. It preserves fossils dating back to the Cretaceous period. Organisms that have been recovered from this formation include indeterminate Elasmosaurids, Mosasaurids, and a Chelonioidean, as well as the sea turtle Desmatochelys, the Mosasaurine Kourisodon, and the octopus Nanaimoteuthis.

== See also ==
- List of fossiliferous stratigraphic units in British Columbia
