= Grimpoteuthis innominata =

Conservation status
- Data Deficient (IUCN 3.1)

Scientific classification
- Kingdom: Animalia
- Phylum: Mollusca
- Class: Cephalopoda
- Order: Octopoda
- Family: Grimpoteuthidae
- Genus: Grimpoteuthis
- Species: G. innominata

Binomial name
- Grimpoteuthis innominata (O'Shea, 1999)

Synonyms
- Enigmatiteuthis innominata

Species of octopus

Grimpoteuthis innominata, commonly known as the small jellyhead, is a species of small, pelagic octopus described by Steve O'Shea in 1999 from two specimens, however several further specimens have since been identified. The genus Enigmateuthis was described to contain this species when described, but Martin Collins placed the species in the genus Grimpoteuthis due to uncertainty regarding the type specimen of Grimpoteuthis.

== Description and habitat ==
Grimpoteuthis innominata has been collected from the Chatham Rise to the east of New Zealand, with a bathymetric range approximately 1600 to 2400 meters depth, close to the seafloor (likely demersal).

The octopus is small, "fitting in two outstretched palms," and its colouring is dark red. This octopus' mantle reaches 43 millimeters long, and a total length up to 156 millimeters long on the type material, it has an internal shell shaped like the letter "U". Some additional specimens captured since its description are somewhat larger, with a mantle length up to 77 millimeters. Its lobe-like fins and the shape of its shell help separate it from other species of Grimpoteuthis living in the Pacific Ocean. There are between 50 and 60 suckers on each arm of the octopus, and the suckers of males are larger than those of females.
