= Porcupine Bank =

Area of the Atlantic Ocean

Coordinates: 53.3333°N 13.5000°W

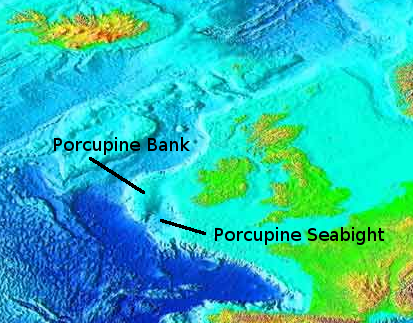
Northeast Atlantic bathymetry, with Porcupine Bank and the Porcupine Seabight labelled.

Porcupine Bank is a raised area on the Irish continental shelf, approximately 200 kilometres (120 mi) west of Ireland. It is 200 m below sea level at its highest.

== Etymology ==
The name comes from the bank's discovery in 1862 by HMS Porcupine, a British sail and paddle-wheel ship used mainly for surveying.

== Location and features ==
Porcupine Bank is located on Ireland's continental shelf, on the fringes of the Atlantic Ocean approximately 200 kilometres (120 mi) west of Ireland. The relatively raised area of seabed, 200 m below sea level at its highest, lies between the deep-water Porcupine Seabight and Rockall Trough.

Porcupine Bank has also been identified with Brasil (also called Hy-Brasil), a phantom island of Irish myth located at approximately the same place as the bank, which was recorded on maps throughout the late Middle Ages. In 1870, eight years after Porcupine Bank's discovery, a paper was read to the Geological Society of Ireland suggesting this identification. The suggestion has since appeared more than once, e.g., in an 1883 edition of Notes and Queries.

== Biological significance ==
The northern and western slopes of the bank feature species of cold-water corals.

According to Dr. Anthony Grehan of the National University of Ireland, Galway, the virtually untouched site could benefit dwindling fish stocks and possibly aid medical research.

"These are by far the most pristine, thriving and hence spectacular examples of cold-water coral reefs that I've encountered in almost ten years of study in Irish waters. There is also evidence of recent recruitment of corals and many other reef animals in the area suggesting this area is an important source of larvae supply to other areas further along the Porcupine Bank."

— Dr. Anthony Grehan
