= Grimpoteuthis wuelkeri =

Wülker's flapjack octopod

Conservation status
- Data Deficient (IUCN 3.1)

Scientific classification
- Kingdom: Animalia
- Phylum: Mollusca
- Class: Cephalopoda
- Order: Octopoda
- Family: Grimpoteuthidae
- Genus: Grimpoteuthis
- Species: G. wuelkeri

Binomial name
- Grimpoteuthis wuelkeri Grimpe, 1920

Synonyms
- Stauroteuthis wuelkeri

Species of octopus

Grimpoteuthis wuelkeri is a medium-sized octopus characterized from multiple specimens.

== Description and habitat ==
This octopus is known from the continental slope in the northern Atlantic Ocean at 2,055 meters deep. It is likely demersal.

At maximum, its body is 400 millimeters long, and its mantle is 115 millimeters long. Its fin span is around 70% of the octopus' total length. The shell is shaped like a letter "U".

Its arms have around 60 to 70 suckers each, and these suckers aren't sexually dimorphic. A web covers about 2/3 of its arms. It has a robust shell, with a thick basal portion, and strong attachments from their fins.
