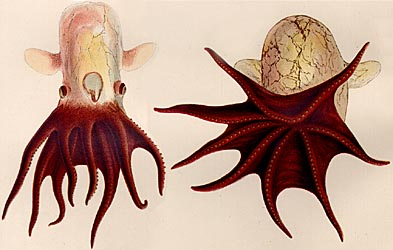
- Drawing of Grimpoteuthis hippocrepium by its discoverer, William Evans Hoyle.

Conservation status
- Data Deficient (IUCN 3.1)

Scientific classification
- Kingdom: Animalia
- Phylum: Mollusca
- Class: Cephalopoda
- Order: Octopoda
- Family: Grimpoteuthidae
- Genus: Grimpoteuthis
- Species: G. hippocrepium

Binomial name
- Grimpoteuthis hippocrepium Hoyle, 1904

= Grimpoteuthis hippocrepium =

Species of octopus

Grimpoteuthis hippocrepium is a species of octopus. It is only known from one specimen found in 1904, which was poorly preserved. Some characteristics of G. hippocrepium are unknown.

== Description and range ==
The type specimen of G. hippocrepium was found near Colombia in the eastern Pacific Ocean. This octopus has over 50 suckers on its arms, and a shell that is like a horseshoe in shape, while its body is around 80 millimeters long. It lives at about 3,332 meters deep. G. hippocrepium could be a demersal species. It is not used by humans.
