= Luteuthis dentatus =

Lu's Jellyhead

Conservation status
- Data Deficient (IUCN 3.1)

Scientific classification
- Kingdom: Animalia
- Phylum: Mollusca
- Class: Cephalopoda
- Order: Octopoda
- Family: Grimpoteuthidae
- Genus: Luteuthis
- Species: L. dentatus

Binomial name
- Luteuthis dentatus O'Shea, 1999

Species of octopus

Luteuthis dentatus, also known as Lu's jellyhead, is a medium-sized species of cirrate octopus found in the southwestern Pacific, originally described by Steve O'Shea.

== Description ==
Luteuthis dentatus reaches a relatively large size with disproportionately long arms. The male holotype specimen from off New Zealand had a total length of 524 mm, while a large female from off Macquarie Island had a total length of 590 mm. However, for the latter specimen, this length was following considerable shrinkage in ethanol, with the original length estimated to be 850 mm. The fins are very large with a red or pink tinge.

The species was given the name dentatus because it has a radula, a tooth-like structure used for tearing food into pieces. Few other cirrate species possess this feature.

== Distribution ==
Luteuthis dentatus was originally described from material collected in the waters around New Zealand, with two specimens being collected over a depth range of 991–1050 m.

The species has more recently been confirmed to also occur off Macquarie Island (Australian Antarctic Territories), with a single large specimen collected at 870–979 m depth.
