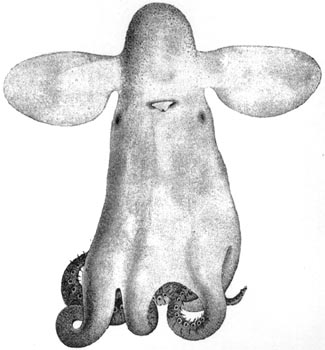
- Grimpoteuthis megaptera a representative of its family illustrating the well developed fins and arm webbing.

Scientific classification
- Kingdom: Animalia
- Phylum: Mollusca
- Class: Cephalopoda
- Order: Octopoda
- Suborder: Cirrina
- Family: Grimpoteuthidae; O'Shea, 1999

Type genus
- Grimpoteuthis

Genera
- Grimpoteuthis; Cryptoteuthis; Luteuthis

= Grimpoteuthidae =

Family of bentho-pelagic octopuses

Grimpoteuthidae are a family of bentho-pelagic octopuses, comprising three currently accepted genera. They have extensive arm webbing and relatively large fins allowing for powerful fin swimming.

== Description ==
Grimpoteuthidae have a strongly U-, V-, W-shaped internal shell (gladius remnant) that supports muscles for large fins. These fins are proportionally much larger than in the related Opisthoteuthidae, and allow for much stronger swimming using the fins alone (unlike Opisthoteuthids that mostly use the arm webbing for swimming). Unlike Cirroctopodidae and Opisthoteuthidae, Grimpoteuthids also have the optic nerves heading to each eye as a single bundle (in the other families this occurs as multiple separated nerve bundles). The extensive arm webbing is shared with Opisthoteuthidae and Cirroctopodidae.

== Taxonomy ==
The following genera and 19 species are currently accepted in this family. The family has consistently been supported in molecular studies as distinct from Opisthoteuthidae and Cirroctopodidae. Many species in the family are known from only a handful (or even single) specimens, and the taxonomy within the family is very uncertain with many species in Grimpoteuthis possibly being representatives of Cryptoteuthis or even new genera.

- Genus Cryptoteuthis Collins, 2004
  - Cryptoteuthis brevibracchiata
- Genus Grimpoteuthis Robson, 1932
  - Grimpoteuthis abyssicola, red jellyhead
  - Grimpoteuthis angularis, angle-shelled dumbo octopus
  - Grimpoteuthis bathynectes, Dumbo octopus
  - Grimpoteuthis challengeri
  - Grimpoteuthis discoveryi
  - Grimpoteuthis greeni, Green's dumbo octopus
  - Grimpoteuthis hippocrepium
  - Grimpoteuthis imperator, emperor dumbo octopus
  - Grimpoteuthis innominata, small jellyhead
  - Grimpoteuthis meangensis
  - Grimpoteuthis megaptera
  - Grimpoteuthis pacifica
  - Grimpoteuthis plena
  - Grimpoteuthis tuftsi
  - Grimpoteuthis umbellata
  - Grimpoteuthis wuelkeri – possibly same as G. umbellata or G. plena
- Genus Luteuthis O'Shea, 1999
  - Luteuthis dentatus, Lu's jellyhead
  - Luteuthis shuishi
