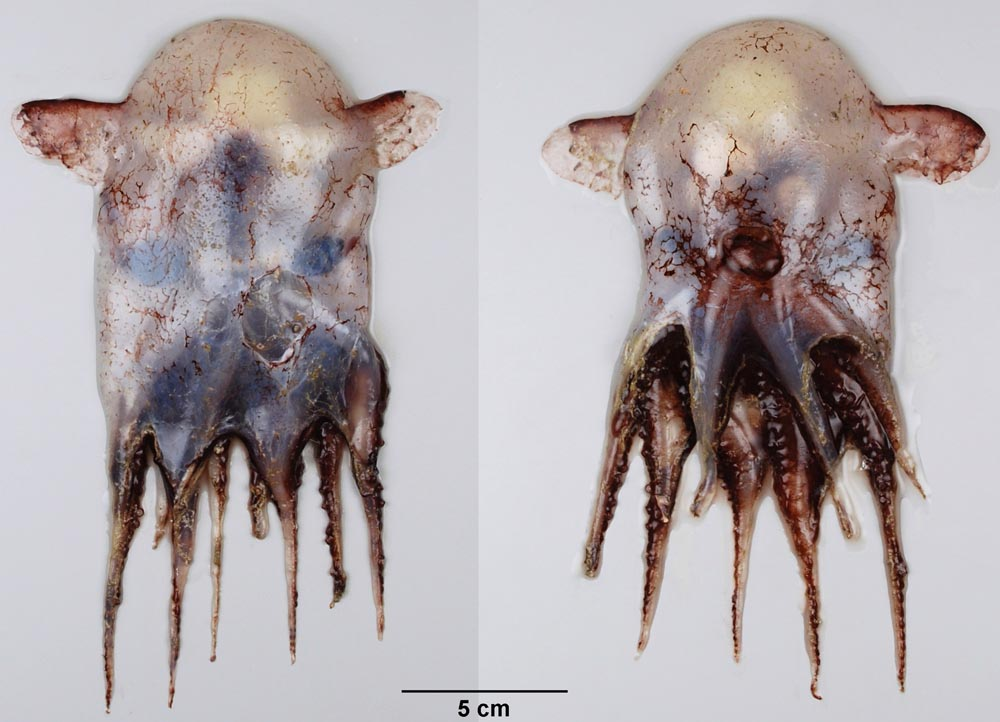
- Grimpoteuthis angularis Holotype specimen in fresh condition (misidentified as G. innominata).

Scientific classification
- Domain: Eukaryota
- Kingdom: Animalia
- Phylum: Mollusca
- Class: Cephalopoda
- Order: Octopoda
- Family: Grimpoteuthidae
- Genus: Grimpoteuthis
- Species: G. angularis

Binomial name
- Grimpoteuthis angularis (Verhoeff & O'Shea, 2022)

= Grimpoteuthis angularis =

Species of octopus

Grimpoteuthis angularis is a species of octopus in the family Grimpoteuthidae. It was first described by Tristan J Verhoeff and Steve O'Shea in 2022, based on a single specimen found in New Zealand.

== Taxonomy ==
The species was given the name angularis, referring to the octopus' angled shell. Verhoeff & O'Shea proposed that the common name of the species should be angle-shelled dumbo octopus. This species (as well as other Grimpoteuthis) may belong in its own family, the Grimpoteuthididae.

== Description and habitat ==
The shell of Grimpoteuthis angularis is V-shaped, notably different to other Grimpoteuthis; the relatively elongate cirri are also distinctive. The holotype was discovered on the Chatham Rise to the east of New Zealand, at a depth of 628 metres.
