= Cryptoteuthis =

Conservation status
- Data Deficient (IUCN 3.1)

Scientific classification
- Kingdom: Animalia
- Phylum: Mollusca
- Class: Cephalopoda
- Order: Octopoda
- Family: Grimpoteuthidae
- Genus: Cryptoteuthis; Collins, 2004
- Species: C. brevibracchiata

Binomial name
- Cryptoteuthis brevibracchiata Collins, 2005

Genus of octopuses

Cryptoteuthis brevibracchiata, the short-arm flapjack octopod, is a deepwater species of octopod. It is the only species in the monotypic genus Cryptoteuthis one of the cirrate octopuses of the family Grimpoteuthidae, the umbrella octopuses. It is known from a single specimen which was collected in the northeastern Atlantic Ocean. It has characteristics which are shared with two other genera, Opisthoteuthis and Grimpoteuthis, but is sufficiently distinctive from either of these to warrant the erection of a new genus.

== Description ==
Cryptoteuthis brevibracchiata is a bell-shaped octopus with a semi-gelatinous, semi-transparent body, except for the dark tips of the oral web and the tips of the fins. The fins are small and round, and their length is equal to half the width of the head. It has short arms, each with a single row of small, broad suckers and with a double row of cirri which are of moderate length, with each cirrus just longer than the diameter of the suckers. The longest arm has 48 suckers and the web is around half the length of the arms. The eyes are laterally positioned and the optic nerve passes through the white body in a single bundle. There are no posterior salivary glands, radula or ink sac. The digestive gland is entire. It has a simple U-shaped shell. The gills have 7 primary lamellae. The mantle length 35 mm and the total length is 121mm.

== Distribution and habitat ==
Cryptoteuthis brevibracchiata was described from a single specimen, an immature female, collected in the northeastern Atlantic Ocean near the Porcupine Seabight at 49°54 N, 12°21 W from a depth of between 2,274 and 2,300m, south west of Ireland. The habitat is unknown but this species is unlikely to be demersal and it shows adaptations which suggest that it may be a benthic species which a preference for soft substrates, like some related taxa, such as Grimpoteuthis.
