= Grimpoteuthis challengeri =

Conservation status
- Least Concern (IUCN 3.1)

Scientific classification
- Kingdom: Animalia
- Phylum: Mollusca
- Class: Cephalopoda
- Order: Octopoda
- Family: Grimpoteuthidae
- Genus: Grimpoteuthis
- Species: G. challengeri

Binomial name
- Grimpoteuthis challengeri Collins, 2003

Species of octopus

Grimpoteuthis challengeri is a species of large octopus living in the abyssal zone.

== Description ==
The octopus is 370 millimeters long in total, while its mantle reaches a length of up to 75 millimeters. It has long arms, and it has a web covering them that reaches 2/3 of the arm length. G. challengeri has between 63 and 72 suckers on its arms. Its shell is shaped like the letter "U".

Like other cirrate octopods, G. challengeri has fins on either side of its mantle that it uses to swim through the ocean. This octopus's fins are long. It also has a beak, as do other octopuses.

G. challengeri is a red-brown color when preserved, and its fins have a slight purple hue.

The octopus's lifespan is unknown. It may lay its eggs on the seafloor, instead of brooding them.

== Habitat ==
G. challengeri is known from multiple specimens collected in the Porcupine Abyssal Plain of the Northeast Atlantic Ocean, while another specimen was found in the northwest Atlantic. It lives 4,828 to 4,838 meters deep. It likely lives in the demersal zone.
