= Neolepadidae =

Scientific classification
- Domain: Eukaryota
- Kingdom: Animalia
- Phylum: Arthropoda
- Class: Thecostraca
- Subclass: Cirripedia
- Order: Scalpellomorpha
- Superfamily: Neolepadoidea
- Family: Neolepadidae; Yamaguchi, Newman & Hashimoto, 2004

Family of crustaceans

Neolepadidae is a family of crustaceans belonging to the order Scalpellomorpha.

Genera:

- Ashinkailepas Yamaguchi, Newman & Hashimoto, 2004
- Leucolepas Southward & Jones, 2003
- Neolepas Newman, 1979
- † Stipilepas Carriol, 2016
- Vulcanolepas Southward & Jones, 2003
