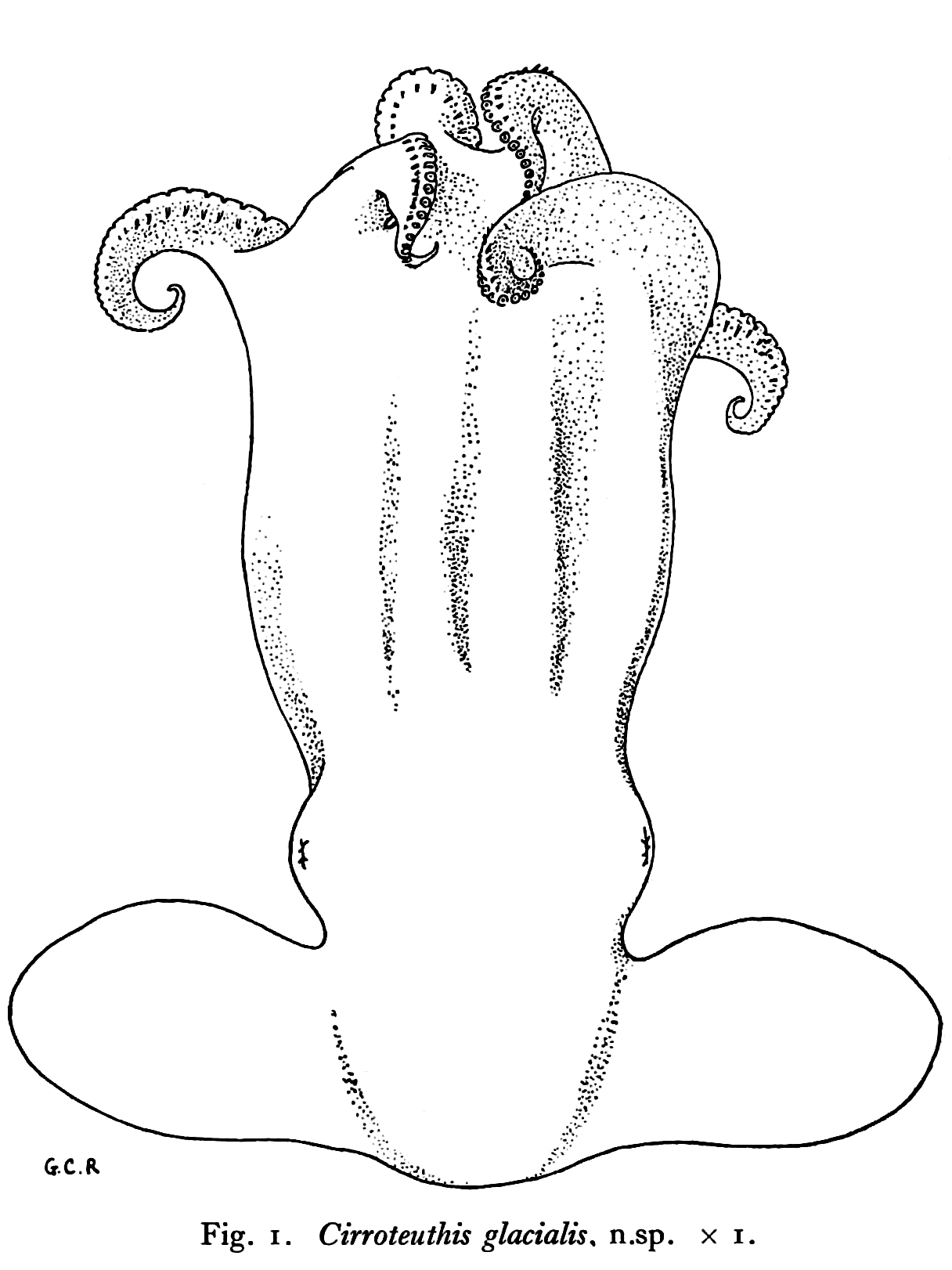

Conservation status
- Least Concern (IUCN 3.1)

Scientific classification
- Kingdom: Animalia
- Phylum: Mollusca
- Class: Cephalopoda
- Order: Octopoda
- Family: Cirroctopodidae
- Genus: Cirroctopus
- Species: C. glacialis

Binomial name
- Cirroctopus glacialis Robson, 1930

Synonyms
- Cirroteuthis glacialis Robson, 1930

= Cirroctopus glacialis =

Species of octopus

Cirroctopus glacialis is an octopus located in the Palmer Archipelago of Antarctica. Its shell is v-shaped, and it has a distinctive pigmentation pattern on its web's oral face. C. glacialis is thought to be demersal, like other members of the genus Cirroctopus. These octopuses are found between 333 and 914 meters deep. Their population is currently unknown.
