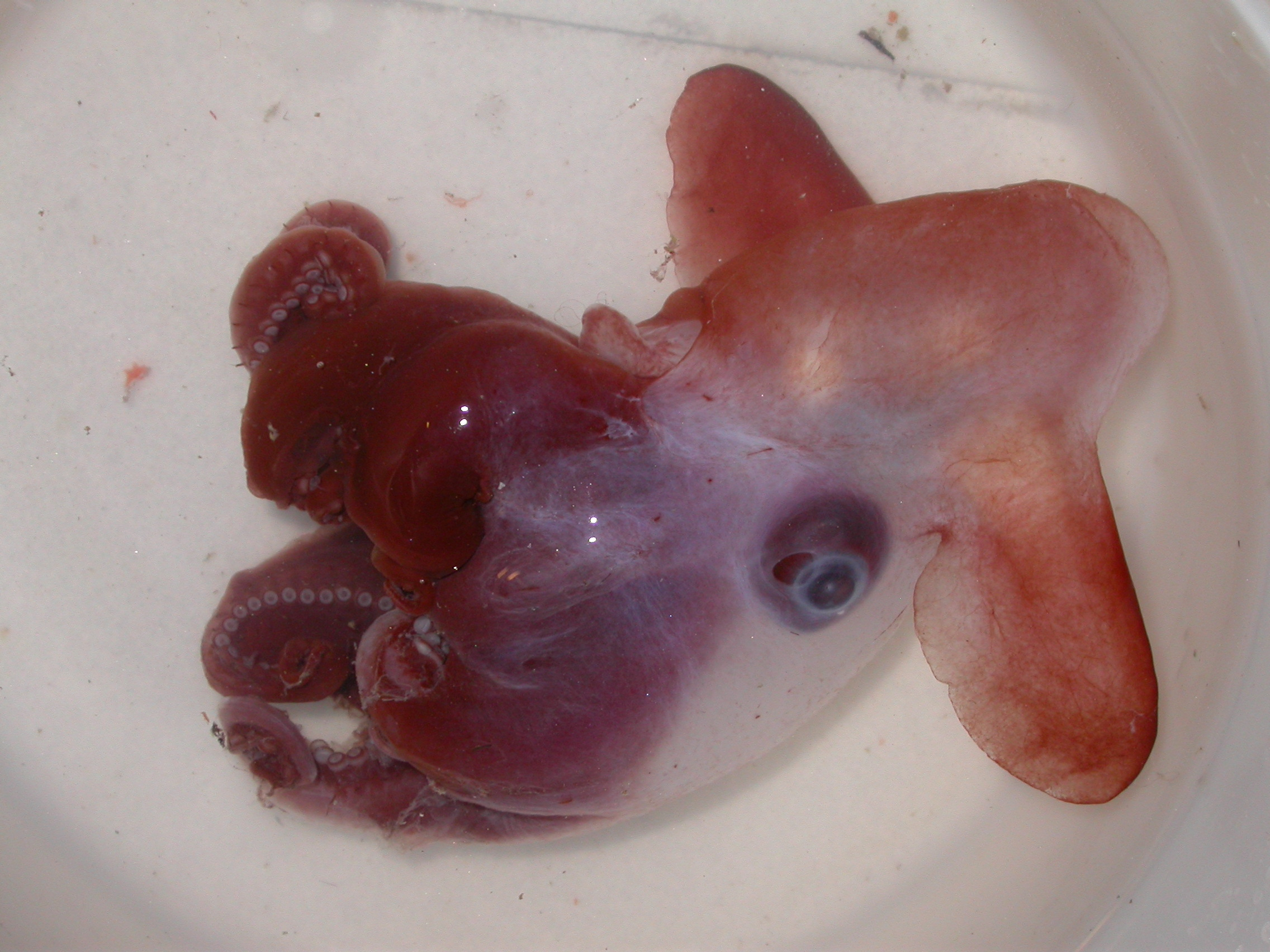
- Specimen collected in 2009

Conservation status
- Least Concern (IUCN 3.1)

Scientific classification
- Kingdom: Animalia
- Phylum: Mollusca
- Class: Cephalopoda
- Order: Octopoda
- Family: Grimpoteuthidae
- Genus: Grimpoteuthis
- Species: G. discoveryi

Binomial name
- Grimpoteuthis discoveryi Collins, 2003

= Grimpoteuthis discoveryi =

Species of octopus

Grimpoteuthis discoveryi is a small species of octopus known from more than 50 specimens. It was described in 2003, but specimens have been found as early as 1910. The type species was found at 49°35'N, 14°01'W, southwest of Ireland.

== Description ==
At maximum, Grimpoteuthis discoveryi's mantle is 58 mm (2.3 in) in length, and its body in total reaches 370 mm (15 in).

Its arms are long. G. discoveryi, like other cirrates, has a web covering its arms to some degree; this species' web reaches 2/3 of its arm length. The suckers on its arms number between 56 and 61. The suckers of female specimens are smaller than the suckers of males, and are also differently shaped. The range in mantle size are larger in females (32–58 mm (1.3–2.3 in)) than males (25–52 mm (0.98–2.05 in)). The posterior salivary glands and radula are both absent in this species, however, its anterior salivary glands are present. The species' body is white, and its eyes are dark grey or black when preserved. It is possible that G. discoveryi is actually two separate species.

== Habitat and population ==
This species has been found in the bathyal zone (also called the midnight zone), specifically from 2,600 to 4,870 m (8,530 to 15,980 ft) below the surface. It lives in the Porcupine Seabight of the northeast Atlantic Ocean. G. discoveryi may be a demersal species, occupying both rocky and soft seafloor. While its population is unknown, the species is classified as Least Concern because it lives at such depths, where human activity is unlikely to affect it.
