= Porcupine Seabight =

Deep-water oceanic basin on the continental margin of the northeastern Atlantic

Porcupine Seabight Basin
- Stratigraphic range: Paleozoic to Mesozoic
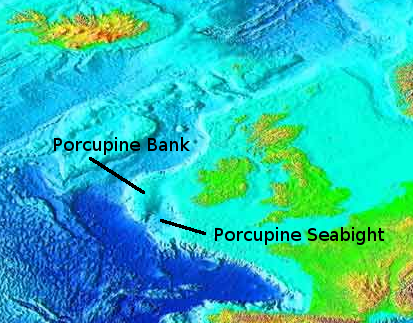
- Northeast Atlantic bathymetry, with Porcupine Bank and Porcupine Seabight
- Type: Oceanic Basin
- Unit of: Atlantic Borderland Basins
- Area: 60,000 km^{2}

Location
- Region: Southwest of Ireland

Type section
- Region: Territorial Waters
- Country: Ireland

The Porcupine Seabight or Porcupine Basin is a deep-water oceanic basin located on the continental margin in the northeastern portion of the Atlantic Ocean. It can be found in the southwestern offshore portion of Ireland and is part of a series of interconnected basins linked to a failed rift structure associated with the opening of the Northern Atlantic Ocean. The basin extends in a North-South direction and was formed during numerous subsidence and rifting periods between the Late Carboniferous and Late Cretaceous. It is bordered by the

- Goban Spur to the south
- Slyne Ridge to the north
- Porcupine Bank to the west
- Porcupine Abyssal Plain to the southwest

Due to subsidence, water depths range from 3000 m in the south near its mouth to 400 m in the north. The Porcupine Basin lies on the Caledonian metamorphic basement and preserves up to 12 km of sedimentary strata from Late Palaeozoic to Quaternary which includes significant hydrocarbon reservoirs. Sediment was likely sourced from the uplifted Caledonian metamorphic rocks of the Porcupine Median Ridge.

The basin lent its name to Operation Seabight, an Irish drug-bust of November 2008.

== Geologic history ==
The basin was formed during numerous subsidence and rifting periods between the Late Carboniferous and Late Cretaceous. Repeated stages of uplift and subsidence were responsible for sediment input, the formation of accommodation space and the creation of steep basin margins:

1. Initial rifting occurred in the Triassic, with a series of minor rifting episodes.
2. Main rifting developed in the Mid to Late Jurassic, and lasted around 20 to 30 million years.
3. Major thermal subsidence, or uplift.
4. Minor rifting in the Early Cretaceous.
5. Irregular subsidence in the Tertiary, from possible lithospheric stretching by rifting or mantle plume.

Extreme stretching of the lithosphere has been documented in the Porcupine Basin. This stretching is especially found in the southern part of the basin as a result of rotation of the Porcupine Ridge away from the Irish shelf.

- Crustal thickness in this area was found to be 7.5 ± 2.5 km.
- Lithospheric stretching of β>6.
  Geoseismic section through the Porcupine Basin

There are a number of unconformities found within the basin. Folding, uplift and related erosion during the Jurassic to Cretaceous produced the regional Base Cretaceous Unconformity in the northern section. Accommodation for the Early Cretaceous succession was not only generated by thermal subsidence following the Late Jurassic crustal extension, but also by compressional deformation during the latest Jurassic–earliest Cretaceous.

Inverted structures found in the basin formed may be related to the initial closure of the Alpine Tethys. The latest Jurassic to Cretaceous uplift, inversion and erosion observed in many basins in Western Europe may also be associated with this event.

== Ecology ==
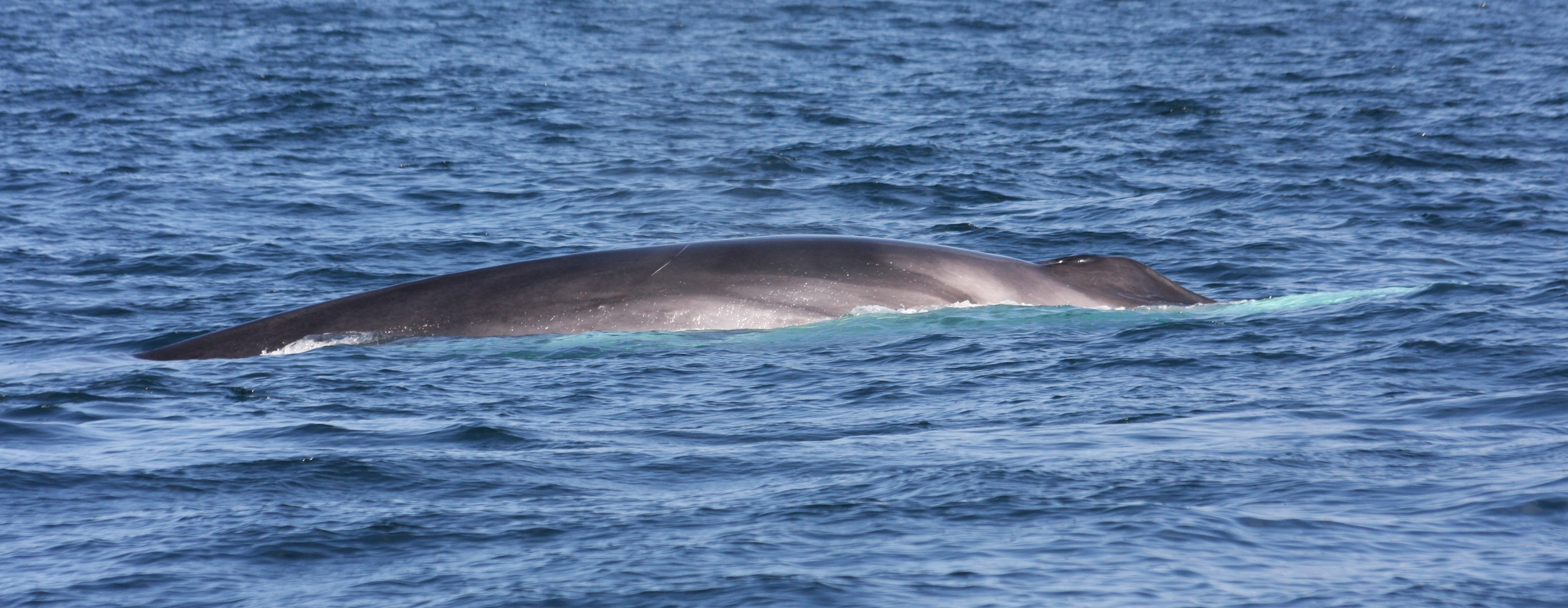
Endangered fin whale swimming in the Bight

A large number and variety of sea life and cetaceans migrate through the area, which is regarded as a prominent habitat for them. This includes many fin whales and blue whales, the first confirmed sighting of the latter in Irish waters being made here as recently as 2008.

== Carbonate mounds ==
The Porcupine Seabight contains some of the most well investigated deep-water carbonate mounds in the world. Carbonate mounds, which can reach heights of up to 600 m, are formed from the accumulation of cold-water corals that trap fine-grained sediment.

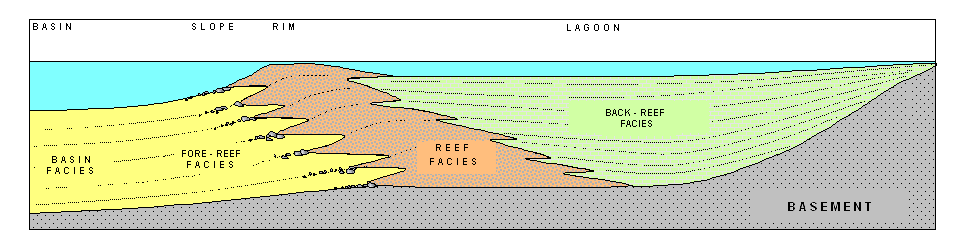
Generalized cross-section of a typical carbonate platform.

These mounds can be found at depths of 500 to 1000 m over areas of a few square kilometers. Three distinct mound provinces are located in the Porcupine Seabight:

1. Belgica Mound Province (eastern slope)
2. Hovland Mound Province (central northern portion)
3. Magellan Mound Province (northern portion).

More than a thousand mounds have been identified in the Porcupine Seabight. The mounds are most common in the northern section, near the Hovland and Magellan Provinces. These carbonate mounds are still not fully understood. Their formation and growth patterns have been hotly debated and multiple hypotheses have been proposed. One hypothesis connects their formation to the seepage of hydrocarbons, either along faults or from former gas-hydrate layers, as a response to glacial-interglacial changes in current patterns and sea levels. Another hypothesis relates their distribution to nutrient fluxes driven by specific oceanic conditions, notably the interaction of internal waves, formed at the boundary between different water masses, with the continental slope.

== Hydrocarbon exploration ==
- 31 wells drilled in total since 1977 by
  - Amoco, BP, Chevron, ExxonMobil, Marathon Oil and Royal Dutch Shell
- Three prospective wells flowed hydrocarbons, these being
  - Burren, Connemara and Spanish Point
- Drilling has met with no commercial success
- Just one well (Dunquin) has been drilled since 2003.

Modelling of hydrocarbon generation shows that the main Jurassic source rocks in the Porcupine Basin are mature to overmature. Hydrocarbon generation started in Late Cretaceous times for the deepest Jurassic sequences, and is still ongoing today along the edges of the basin. The carbonate mounds found in the basin may in fact be surface expressions of an underlying active petroleum system.

There are likely to be multiple potential fluid migration pathways within the basin. The presence of oil shown at different levels of the stratigraphy attests to the ability of fluids to move from deep to shallower levels in the Mesozoic and Cenozoic. Major igneous activity, of Early Cretaceous and Palaeogene times, is also likely to have produced fluid circulation patterns and some additional fluid transport channels along the flanks of volcanic centres, through associated dyke systems and compaction-associated faults above the volcanic centres.

The overall morphology of the basin, shallowing towards the margins and towards the northern section, is likely to have facilitated fluid migration in Cenozoic times towards these shallower regions. All of these point towards the movement of mantle-derived fluids within the basin, directed towards the basin margins.

== See also ==
- List of abyssal plains and oceanic basins
- List of oceanic landforms
- Solid Earth
