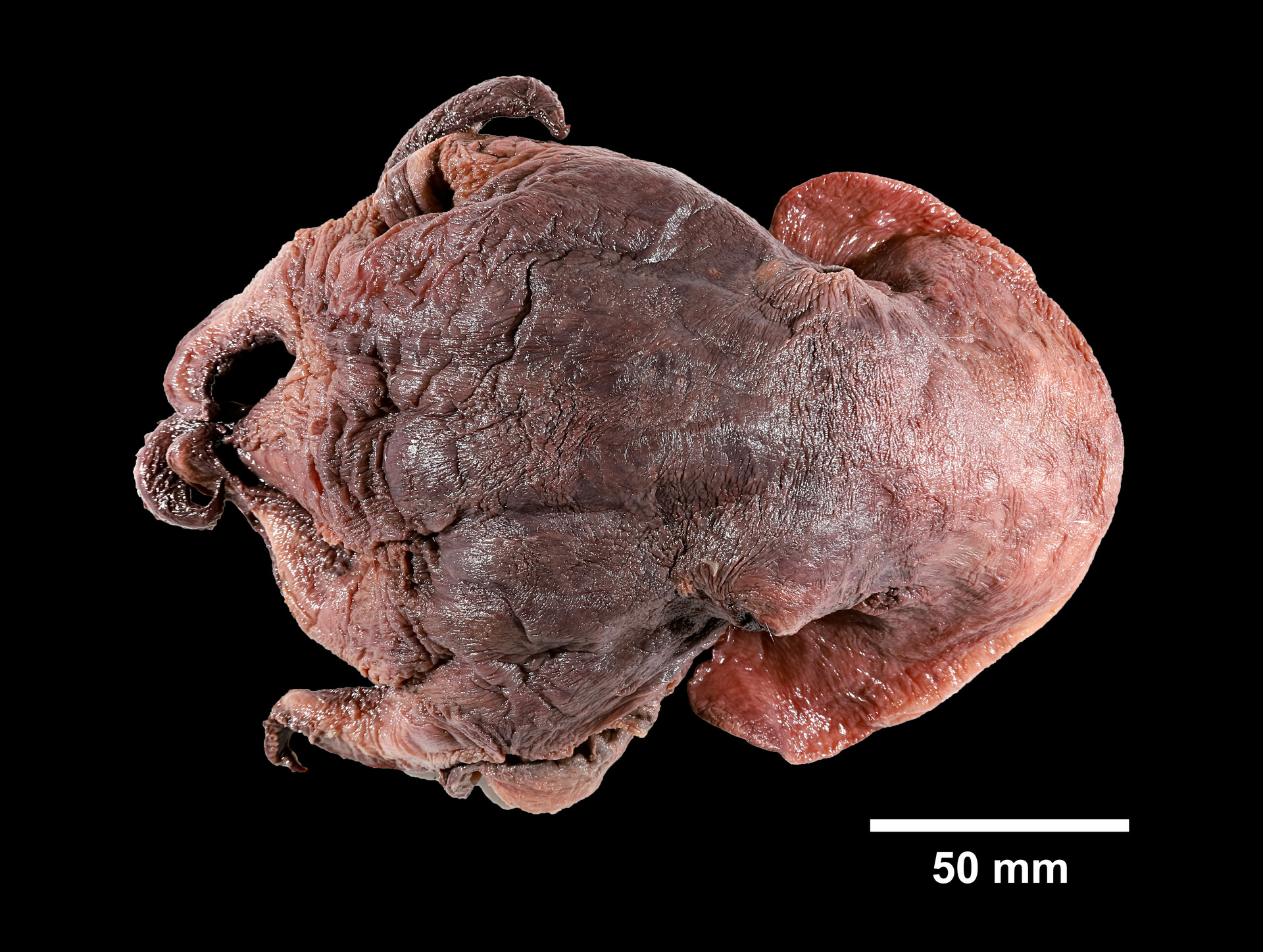
- Preserved octopus of genus Cirroctopus found near the Antarctic Peninsula

Scientific classification
- Domain: Eukaryota
- Kingdom: Animalia
- Phylum: Mollusca
- Class: Cephalopoda
- Order: Octopoda
- Suborder: Cirrata
- Family: Cirroctopodidae; Collins & Villenueva, 2006
- Genus: Cirroctopus; Naef, 1923

Type species
- Cirroctopus mawsoni (Berry, 1917)

Species
- Cirroctopus antarctica (Kubodera & Okutani, 1986); Cirroctopus glacialis (Robson, 1930); Cirroctopus hochbergi O'Shea, 1999; Cirroctopus mawsoni (Berry, 1917)

= Cirroctopus =

Genus of octopuses

Cirroctopus is a genus of four species of octopuses within the monotypic family Cirroctopodidae. Members of this genus have larger fins than other cirrate octopuses, and tend to be more muscular. They are found in the southern hemisphere, where they live at depths of over 300m.
