= Cirrate shell =

Internal shell of cirrate octopuses

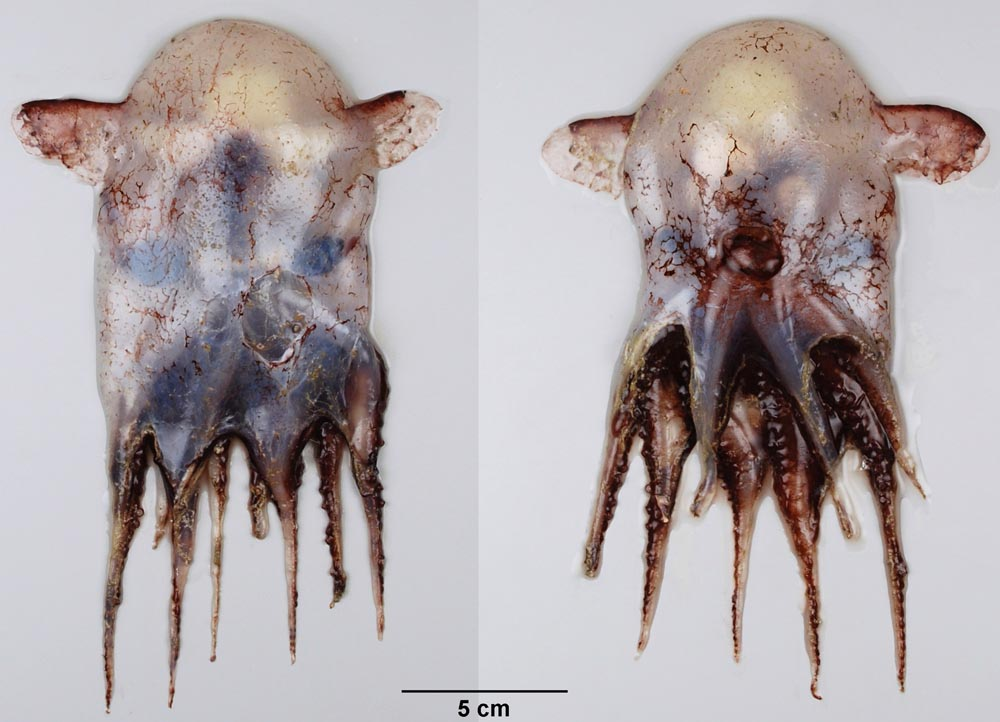
Dorsal (left) and ventral aspects of a mature female Grimpoteuthis angularis (73 mm ML).

Cirrate octopuses possess a well-developed internal shell that supports their muscular swimming fins. This is in contrast to the more familiar, finless, incirrate octopuses, in which the shell remnant is either present as a pair of stylets or absent altogether.

The cirrate shell is quite unlike that of any other living cephalopod group and has its own dedicated set of descriptive terms. It is usually roughly arch- or saddle-shaped and is rather soft, being similar in consistency to cartilage. Each of the eight extant cirrate genera is characterised by a distinct shell morphology outlined below (below taxonomy updated per WoRMS):

- Superfamily Cirroteuthoidea
  - Cirroteuthidae
    - Cirroteuthis — saddle-shaped, with large wings
    - Cirrothauma — butterfly-shaped
  - Stauroteuthidae
    - Stauroteuthis — U-shaped
- Superfamily Opisthoteuthoidea
  - Opisthoteuthidae
    - Opisthoteuthis (also Exsuperoteuthis & Insigniteuthis)— U-shaped, lateral wings usually tapering to fine points but termination complex in certain species
  - Cirroctopodidae
    - Cirroctopus — V-shaped, lateral wings tapering to fine points
  - Grimpoteuthidae
    - Grimpoteuthis — U-shaped, lateral wings ends expanded in a broad lobe (with offset spike present or absent).
    - Luteuthis — W-shaped, lateral wings ends expanded (with offset spike present).
    - Cryptoteuthis — U-shaped, each lateral wing ending in broad lobe with pointed projection.

The comparatively simple shells of Opisthoteuthidae and Stauroteuthidae are thought to approximate the ancestral shape, with those of Cirroteuthidae being more derived. The shell of Cirroctopus appears transitional in form between those of incirrate octopuses and other cirrates, and resembles the reduced shell of the Late Cretaceous Palaeoctopus newboldi. The paired, rod-shaped stylets of incirrates are evolutionarily derived from the lateral wings and horns of the cirrate shell.
