= Cephalopod fin =

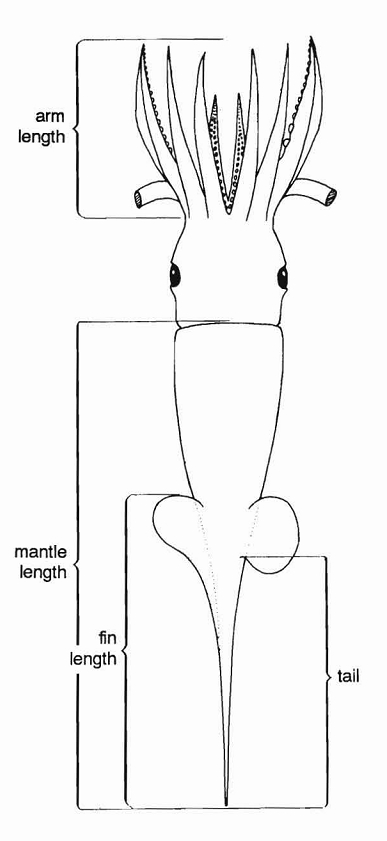
Standard measurements for squid, showing the location of the fins and tail in different configurations

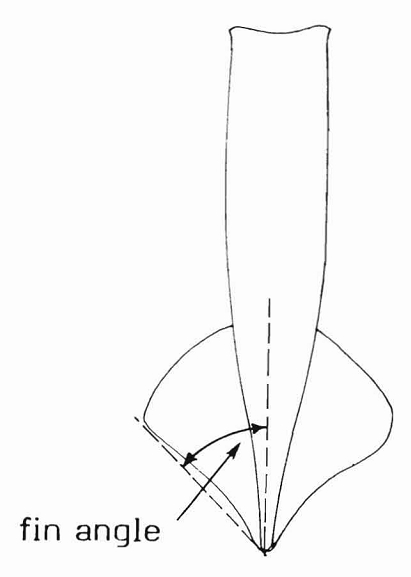
Measurement of fin angle in a squid with sagittate fins

Cephalopod fins, sometimes known as wings, are paired flap-like locomotory appendages. They are found in ten-limbed cephalopods (including squid, bobtail squid, cuttlefish, and Spirula) as well as in the eight-limbed cirrate octopuses and vampire squid. Many extinct cephalopod groups also possessed fins. Nautiluses and the more familiar incirrate octopuses lack swimming fins. An extreme development of the cephalopod fin is seen in the bigfin squid of the family Magnapinnidae.

Fins project from the mantle and are often positioned dorsally. In most cephalopods, the fins are restricted to the posterior end of the mantle, but in cuttlefish and some squid they span the mantle's entire length.

Fin attachment varies greatly among cephalopods, though in all cases it involves specialised fin cartilage (which reaches its greatest development in Octopodiformes). A fin may be attached to the internal shell or shell remnant (such as the gladius), to the opposite fin, to the mantle, or a combination of these.

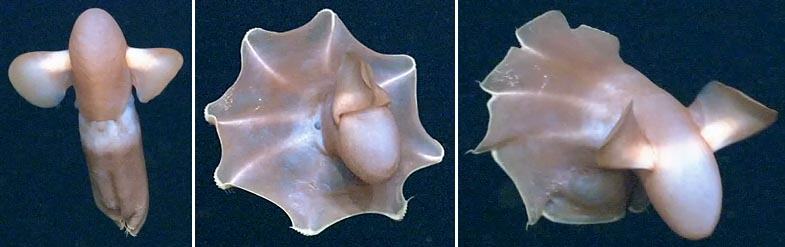
Time series showing up-and-down fin movement in an individual of the cirrate octopod Cirroteuthis muelleri

== Tail and secondary fins ==
Certain squid species possess a tail, which is an extension of the body past the fins. The tail may be said to start at "the point where a hypothetical line, continuous with the broad posterior edge of the fin, crosses the midline of the body". This tail may be lost with age (as in most paralarval chiroteuthids) or remain through sexual maturity (as in Grimalditeuthis). Grimalditeuthis and larval Chiroteuthis are unusual in that they possess a pair of flotation devices or "secondary fins" attached to the tail. The vampire squid (Vampyroteuthis infernalis) also has two pairs of fins during a brief period of its ontogeny, and secondary fins have been reported in the extinct Trachyteuthis.

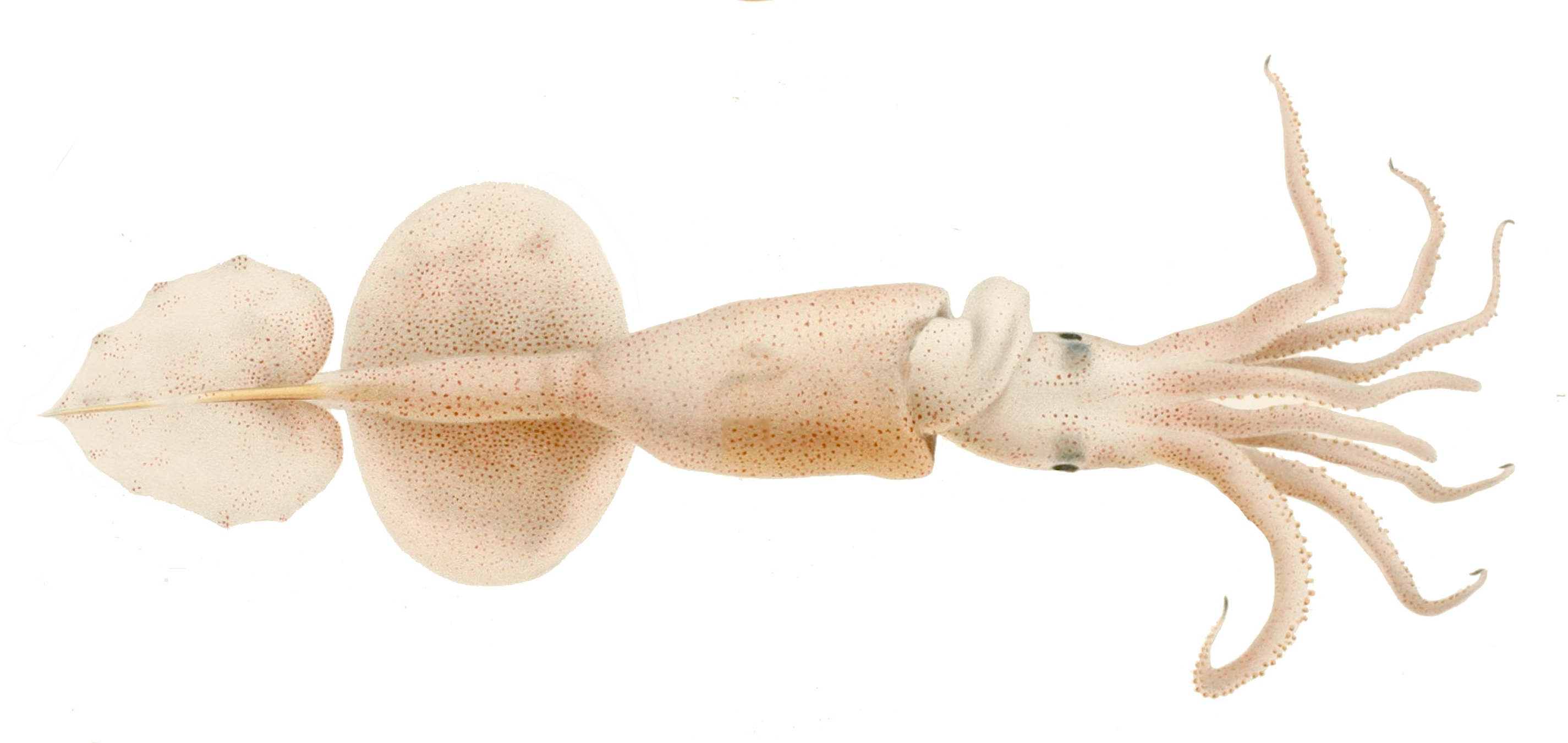
Adult Grimalditeuthis bonplandi with "secondary fins" supported on a well-developed tail

== Fin morphology and placement ==
Cephalopod fin morphology is highly variable. The fins may be large and muscular, extending for the entire length of the mantle, or greatly reduced (sometimes less than 10% ML) and restricted to the mantle's posterior end. Fin placement in cephalopods is often termed normal, terminal, or subterminal, depending on their position with respect to the muscular mantle.

Eight major fin shapes can be distinguished among the Decapodiformes: sagittate (the most common shape in squid), rhomboid, circular/elliptical, lanceolate, ear-shaped, ribbed, lobate, and skirt-like.

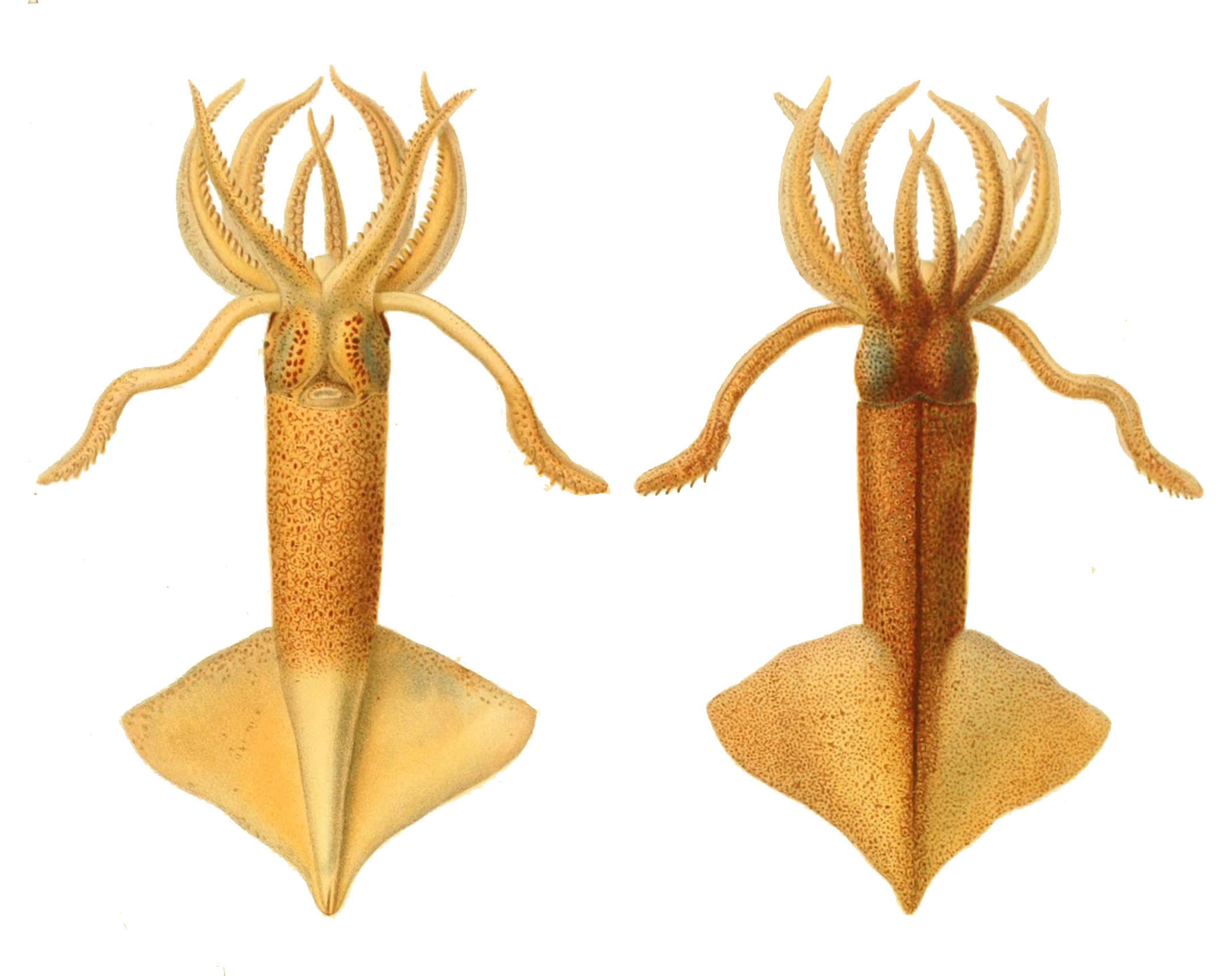
Ventral (left) and dorsal aspects of Onychoteuthis banksii, showing classic sagittate fins

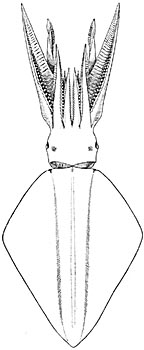
The diamondback squid, Thysanoteuthis rhombus, has full-length rhomboid fins

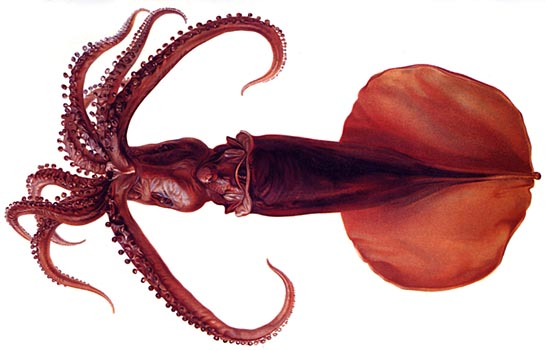
Mastigoteuthis magna has very large circular fins, characteristic of its family, Mastigoteuthidae

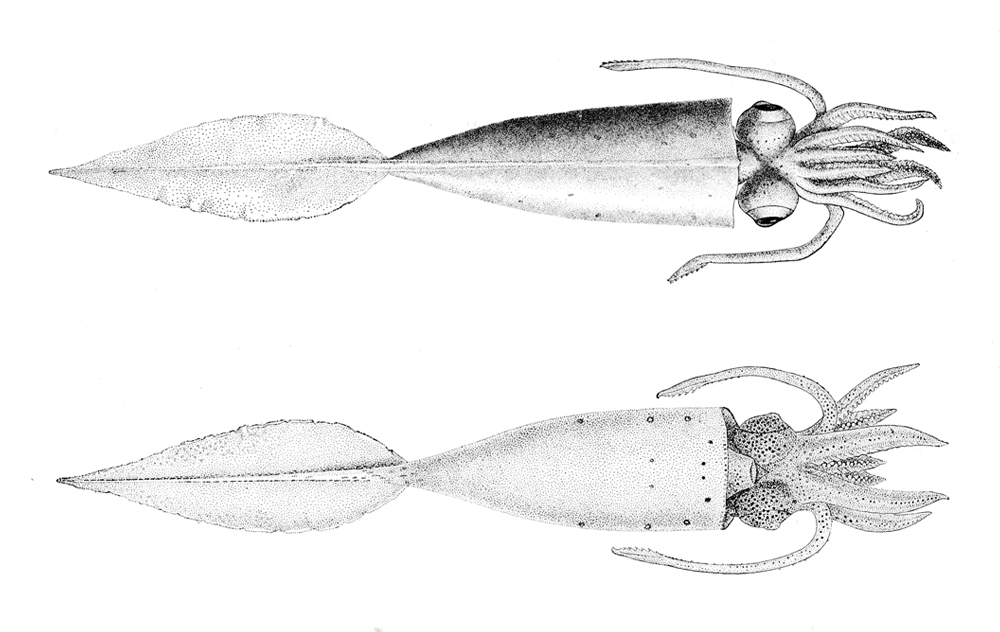
Galiteuthis phyllura in dorsal (top) and ventral views, showing its lanceolate fins
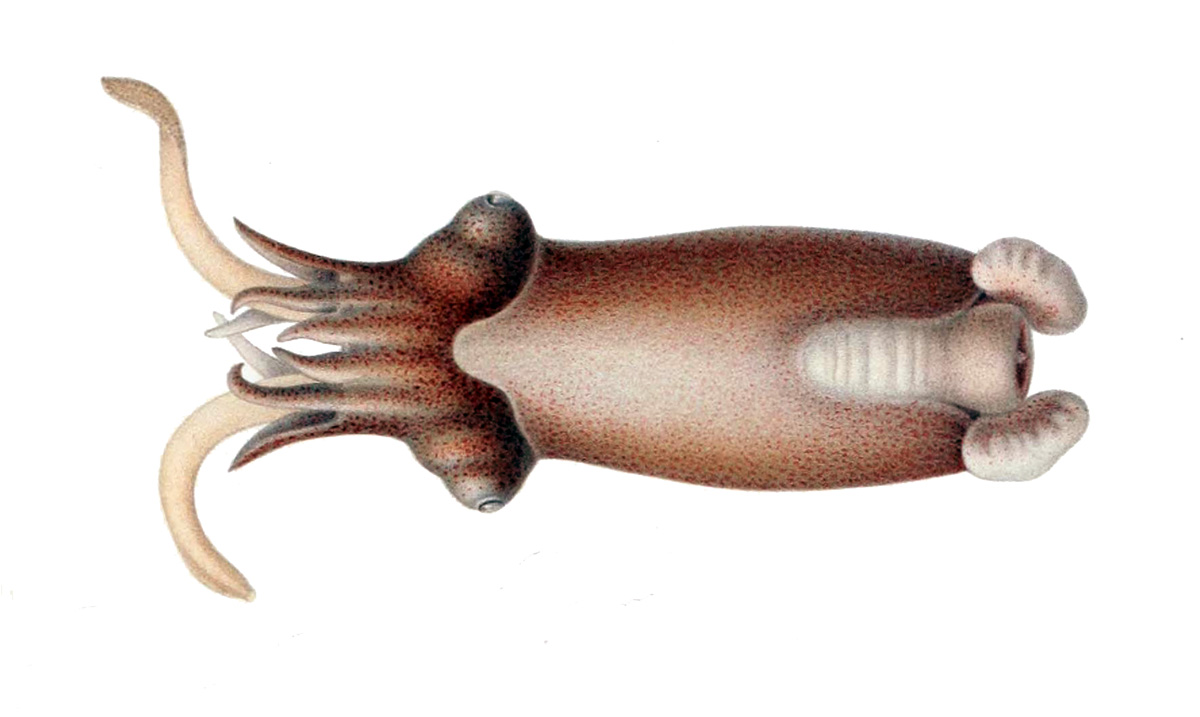
Spirula spirula has small ear-shaped fins on either side of a terminal photophore

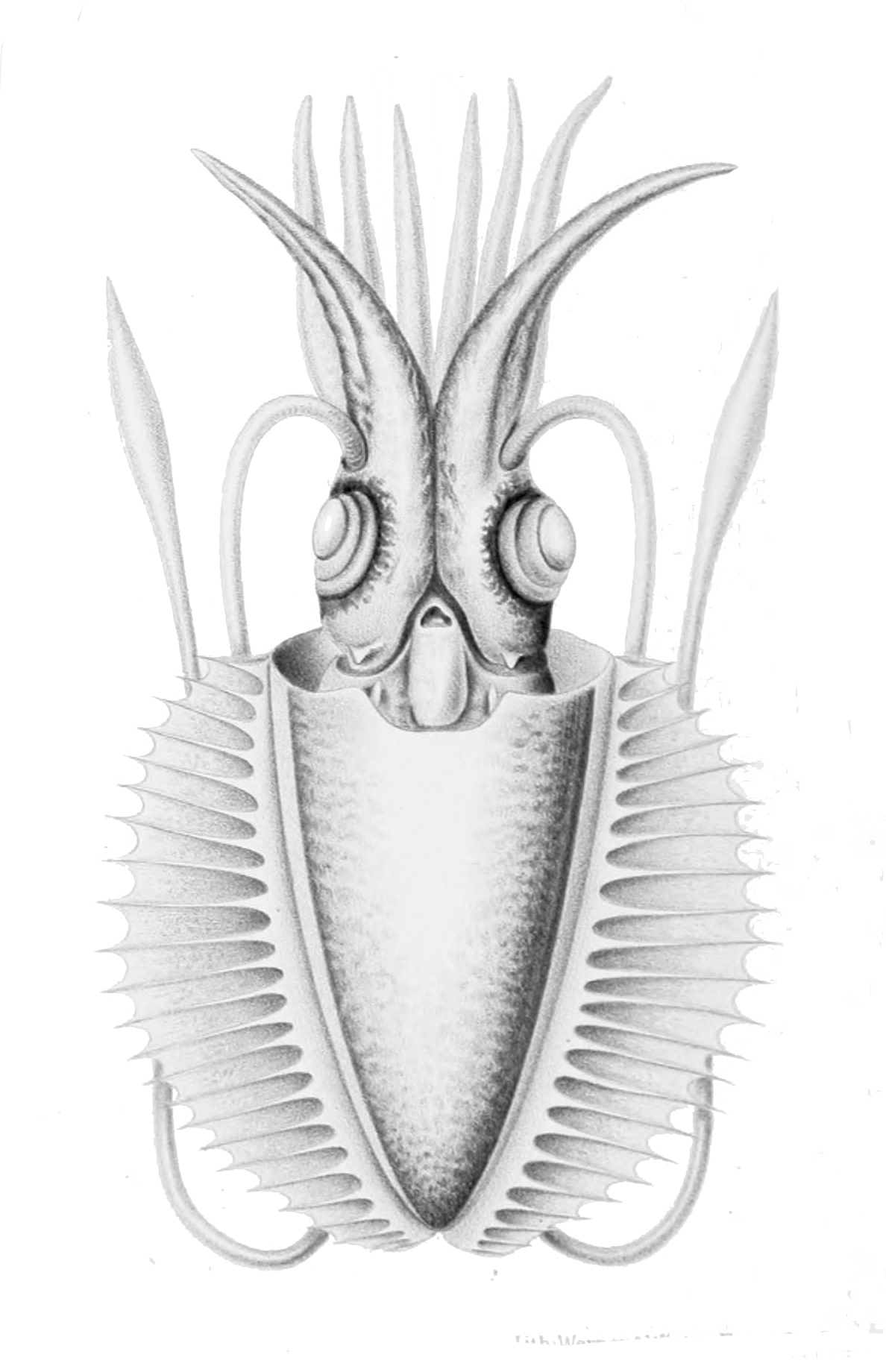
The highly distinctive ribbed fins of Chtenopteryx sicula

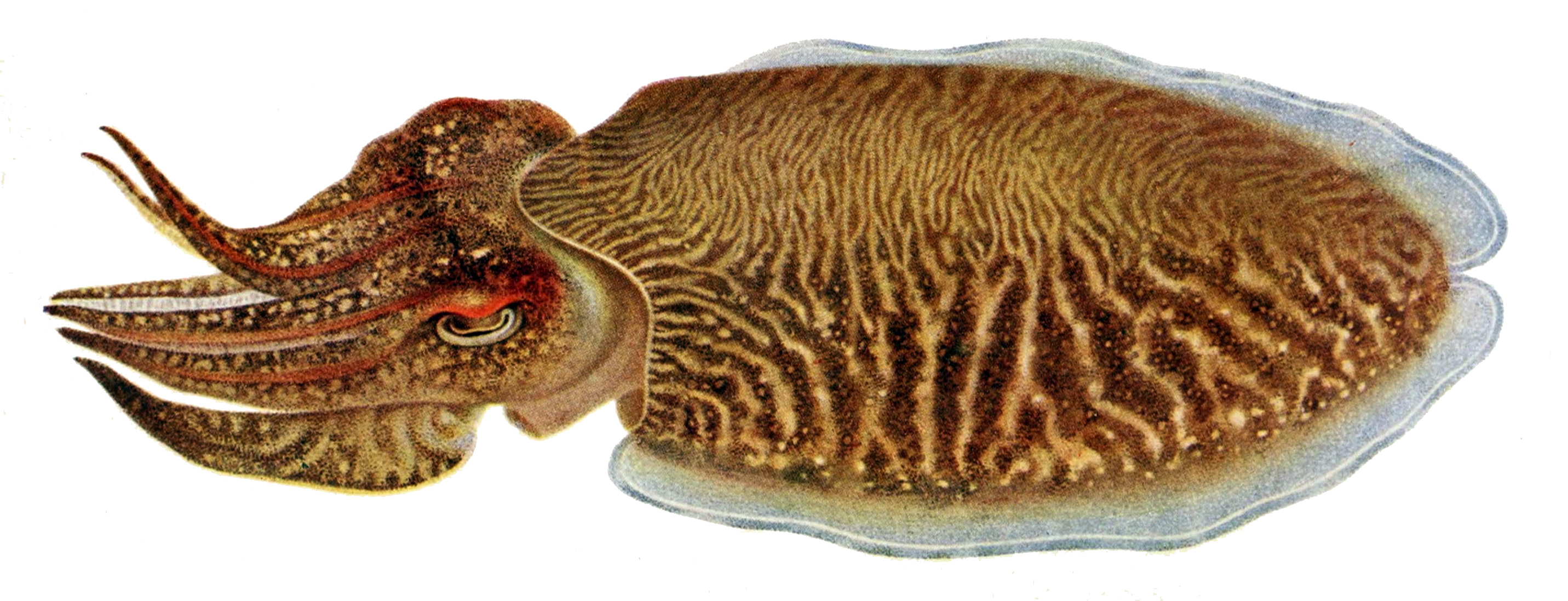
Skirt-like fins spanning the length of the mantle are characteristic of sepiids, such as this Sepia officinalis
