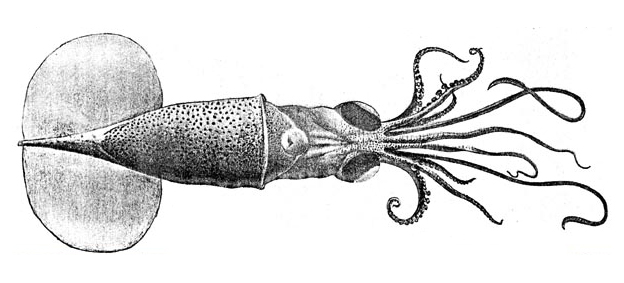
- Planctoteuthis danae

Scientific classification
- Kingdom: Animalia
- Phylum: Mollusca
- Class: Cephalopoda
- Order: Oegopsida
- Family: Chiroteuthidae
- Genus: Planctoteuthis; Pfeffer, 1912

Type species
- Doratopsis exophthalmica Chun, 1908

Species
- See text

Synonyms
- Valbyteuthis Joubin, 1931

= Planctoteuthis =

Genus of squids

Planctoteuthis is a genus of chiroteuthid squid comprising five species, occurring worldwide in lower mesopelagic to bathypelagic depths in tropical to temperate waters. It has been suggested that members of Planctoteuthis are neotenic, retaining characteristics of the doratopsis developmental stage. This is marked in the retention of the paralarval tentacular club, unique among subadult chiroteuthids. Members lack both photophores and a funnel valve. The genus was originally placed within the monotypic family Valbyteuthidae, under the name Valbyteuthis. Similarities between the paralavae of Valbyteuthis and Chiroteuthis led to its inclusion in the family Chiroteuthidae. Eventually, Valbyteuthis was incorporated as a junior synonym of Planctoteuthis, citing previous descriptions of the paralarvae.

== Species ==
- Planctoteuthis danae
- Planctoteuthis exopthalmica
- Planctoteuthis levimana
- Planctoteuthis lippula
- Planctoteuthis oligobessa
