= Long-armed squid =

Long-armed squid may refer to various long-limbed squid of the suborder Oegopsina:

- Bigfin squid, various species of the family Magnapinnidae
- Chiroteuthis veranii, a squid of the family Chiroteuthidae
