= Vérany =

Vérany, sometimes Verany, is a French family name originally from the Varennes area. Notable people with the surname include:

- Jean Baptiste Vérany (1800–1865), French pharmacist and naturalist and malacologist
- Pierre Verany, French record producer
