= Asperoteuthis mangoldae =

- Asperoteuthis mangoldae paratype (100 mm ML)

Conservation status
- Data Deficient (IUCN 3.1)

Scientific classification
- Kingdom: Animalia
- Phylum: Mollusca
- Class: Cephalopoda
- Order: Oegopsida
- Family: Chiroteuthidae
- Genus: Asperoteuthis
- Species: A. mangoldae

Binomial name
- Asperoteuthis mangoldae Young, Vecchione & Roper, 2007

Species of mollusc

Asperoteuthis mangoldae, previously known as Asperoteuthis sp. A, is a chiroteuthid squid known only from the waters off the Hawaiian Islands. It differs from the closely related Asperoteuthis acanthoderma in lacking integumental tubercles and elongate fins. This species also possesses a characteristic curved groove in its funnel locking apparatus.

A. mangoldae is known from 18 specimens and was formally described in 2007. The holotype was collected in 1972 in an opening-closing trawl at a depth of 820–870 m (2,690–2,850 ft) in Hawaiian waters. The coordinates of the type locality are 21°25′N 158°20.5′W. The species was filmed alive for the first time in July 2019, recorded off Jarvis Island by the EV Nautilus at a depth of 930 m (3,050 ft). It was identified as A. mangoldae by Michael Vecchione, an American zoologist who contributed to the description of the species.

The specific name honors Swiss marine biologist Dr. Katharina Mangold-Wirz (1922–2003), who worked at the Laboratoire Arago, Université Pierre et Marie Curie in Banyuls-sur-Mer, France. Dr Mangold spent a part of her career studying cephalopods in Hawaii.
