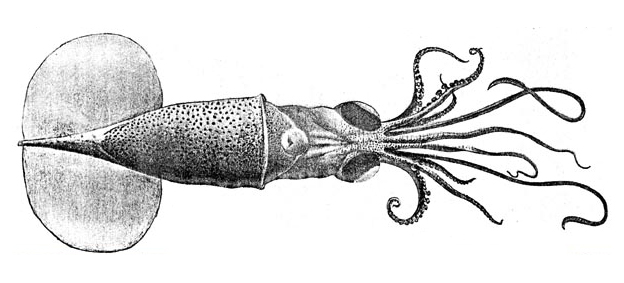

Conservation status
- Least Concern (IUCN 3.1)

Scientific classification
- Kingdom: Animalia
- Phylum: Mollusca
- Class: Cephalopoda
- Order: Oegopsida
- Family: Chiroteuthidae
- Genus: Planctoteuthis
- Species: P. danae

Binomial name
- Planctoteuthis danae (Joubin, 1931)

Synonyms
- Valbyteuthis danae Joubin, 1931

= Planctoteuthis danae =

Species of squid

Planctoteuthis danae, or Dana's chiroteuthid squid, is a species of chiroteuthid squid. It is distinguished from further members of Planctoteuthis by a fin length greater than half of the mantle. During the paralarval stage, the species occurs in depths of 200–300 m (660–980 ft), progressing to 200–800 m (660–2,620 ft) at 10–15 mm (0.39–0.59 in) ML; larger specimens have been captured from 700 m (2,300 ft) to in excess of 1,000 m (3,300 ft). The type locality of P. danae is in the Gulf of Panama, and it has also been recorded from the eastern Pacific Ocean and North Atlantic Ocean.
