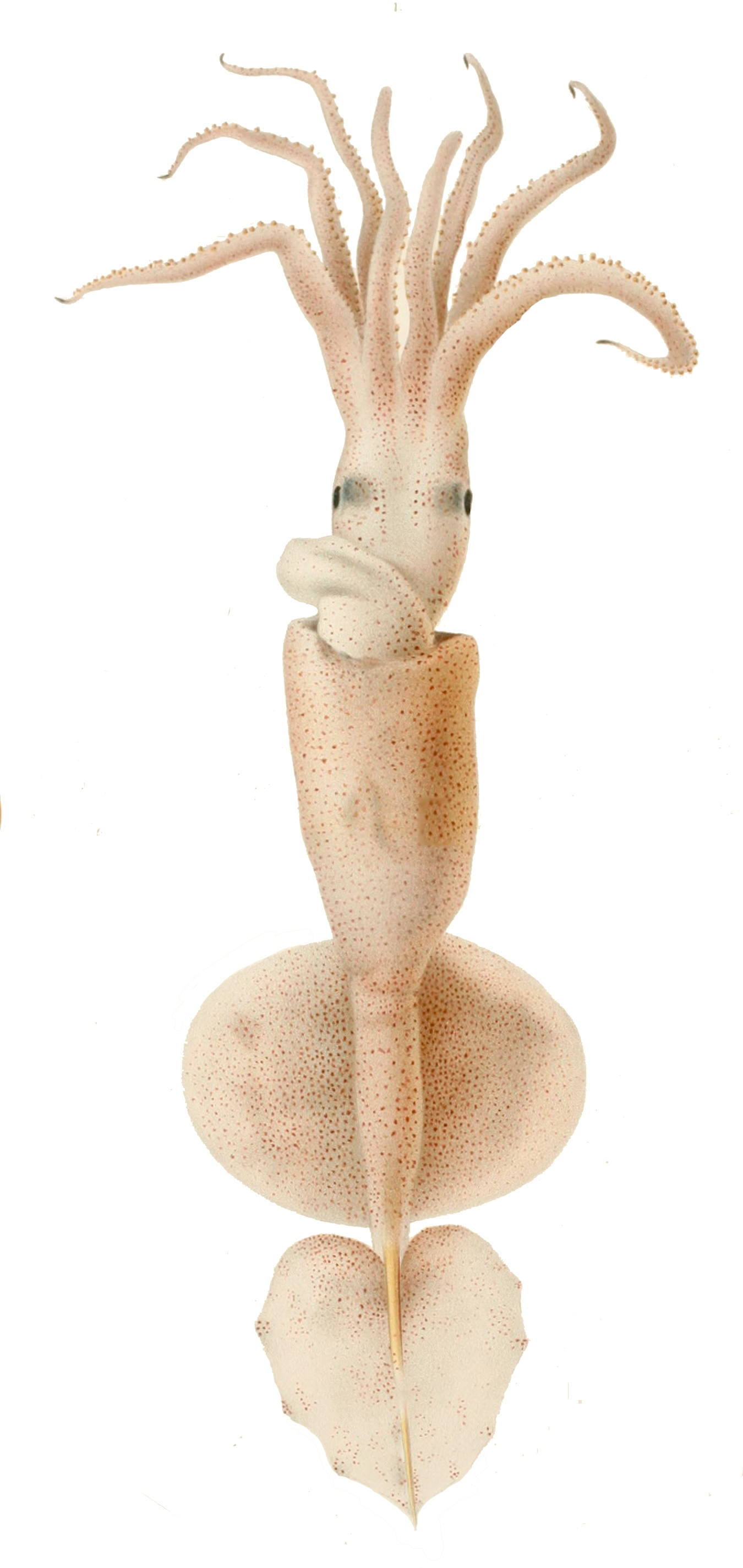

Conservation status
- Least Concern (IUCN 3.1)

Scientific classification
- Kingdom: Animalia
- Phylum: Mollusca
- Class: Cephalopoda
- Order: Oegopsida
- Family: Chiroteuthidae
- Genus: Grimalditeuthis; L. Joubin, 1898
- Species: G. bonplandi

Binomial name
- Grimalditeuthis bonplandi (Vérany, 1839)

Synonyms
- Loligopsis bonplandi Vérany, 1836; Grimalditeuthis richardi Joubin, 1898; Doratopsis sagitta Chun, 1908

= Grimalditeuthis =

Genus of squids

Grimalditeuthis bonplandi is a squid named after the Grimaldi family, reigning house of Monaco. Prince Albert I of Monaco was an amateur teuthologist who pioneered the study of deep sea squids by collecting the 'precious regurgitations' of sperm whales. The specific name bonplandi refers to the French scientist Aimé Bonpland.

The squid was observed alive in the wild for the first time in 2005 in a study.

Grimalditeuthis bonplandi is a bioluminescent species. This species shows an interesting case of aggressive mimicry, with the tips of the long tentacles having the appearance of a small harmless squid. It lures fish and other squids by dangling the tips of the tentacles very far away from its body, then quickly snatching the fooled prey into its death. Intact tentacles suspected to be from this species have been found inside the longnose lancetfish.

== Distribution ==
This squid has been infrequently encountered, but it is believed to exist worldwide. It lives in the mesopelagic and bathypelagic zone at depths of 200–1500 m below sea level.

== Morphology ==
G. bonplandi's maximum mantle length is 25 cm. It differs from its family Chiroteuthidae by having a longer neck and a different body and fin shape. Its mantle locking apparatus is also fused. It is one of the many squids that is bioluminescent. Its photophores are present only in the tips of the female squid's tentacles.

== See also ==
- Anglerfish
- Alligator snapping turtle
- False cleanerfish
- Spider-tailed horned viper
