= Asperoteuthis lui =

Conservation status
- Data Deficient (IUCN 3.1)

Scientific classification
- Kingdom: Animalia
- Phylum: Mollusca
- Class: Cephalopoda
- Order: Oegopsida
- Family: Chiroteuthidae
- Genus: Asperoteuthis
- Species: A. lui

Binomial name
- Asperoteuthis lui Salcedo-Vargas, 1999

Species of squid

Asperoteuthis lui is a chiroteuthid squid of the genus Asperoteuthis. This species was discovered from the stomach contents of a ling, a species of fish. The damaged specimen did not include a funnel or a mantle, but had multiple arms, one tentacle, and eyes. It was initially identified as a species of giant squid of the genus Architeuthis.
