= Jean-Baptiste Barla =

French botanist

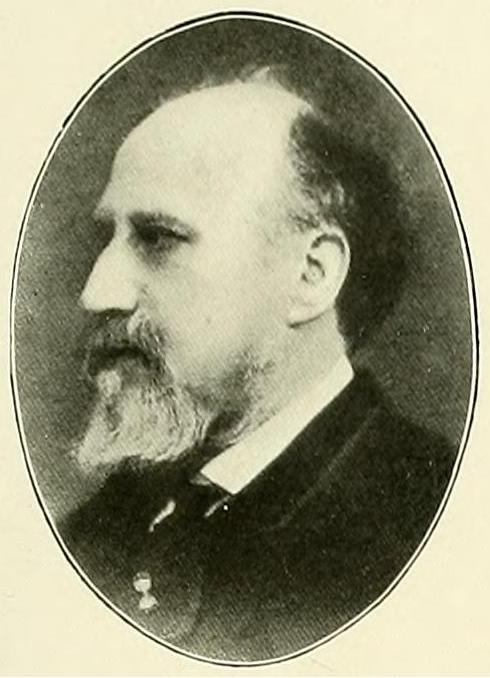
Jean-Baptiste Barla

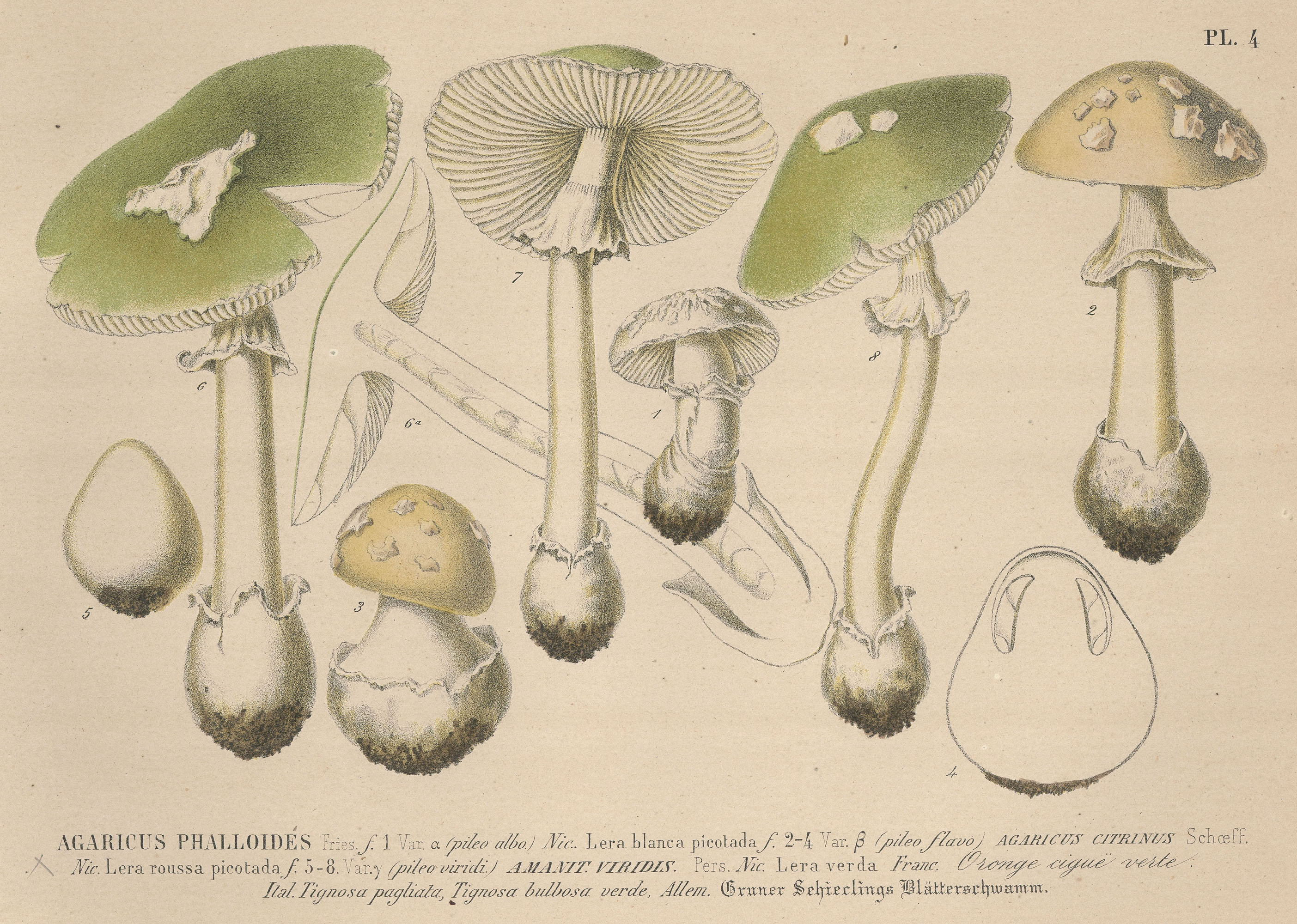
Agaricus plate from Les Champignons De La Province De Nice

Jean-Baptiste Barla (3 May 1817, Nice – 6 November 1896) was a French botanist.

Barla was a man of independent means and dedicated himself to investigate the fungi and orchids of the South of France. "Cette végétation exceptionelle, doit évidemment sa richesse et sa variété à la configuration topographique, toute particulière, du bassin des Alpes-Maritimes. Dans ce pays favorisé par la nature, croissent la plupart des orchidées de France, d'Italie, d'Allemange, etc." (Introduction to illustrée de Nice et des Alpes-Maritimes).

In 1846 with Jean Baptiste Vérany (1800–1865) he founded the Muséum d'histoire naturelle de Nice where wax casts of thousands of mushrooms he made or had made were exhibited.

== Works ==
Partial list:

- 1855 Tableau comparatif des champignons comestibles et vénéneux de Nice Nice Impr. Canis Frères..
- 1859 Les Champignons De La Province De Nice Nice Impr. Canis Frères.
- 1885 Liste des champignons nouvellement observés dans le département des Alpes-Maritimes. Sous-Genre I.- Amanita. Bull. Soc. Mycol.France 1: 189-194.
- 1886 Liste des champignons nouvellement observés dans le département des Alpes-Maritimes. Bull. Soc. Mycol. France 2(3): 112–119.
- 1868 Flore illustrée de Nice et des Alpes-Maritimes. Iconographie des Orchidées. Nice, Caisson et Mignon. Dedicated to the Italian botanist Filippo Parlatore, reprinted 1996.
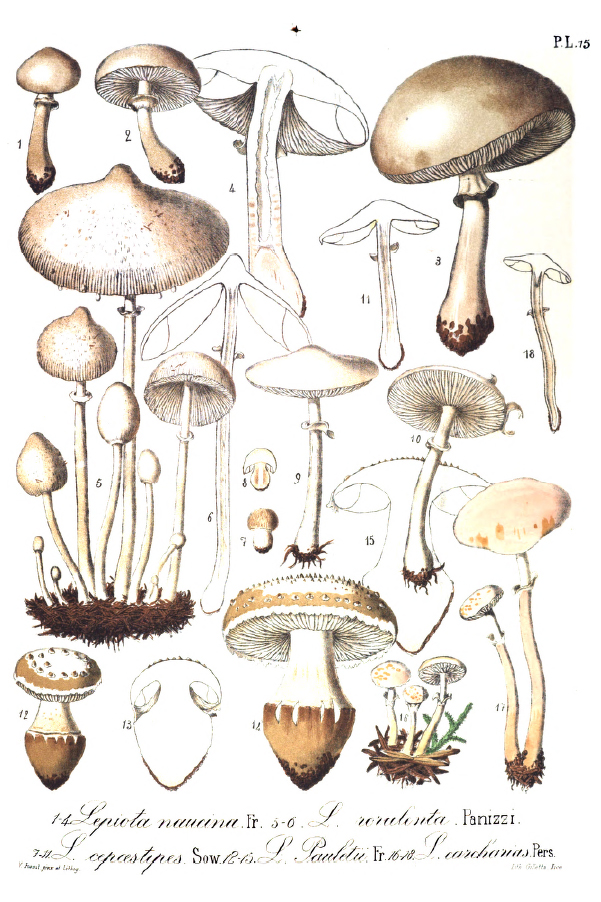
Lepiota species illustrated in Flore mycologique illustrée

Published exsiccata (herbarium duplicate specimens series)

- before 1888 Mycologia Nicaeensis exsiccata
