= Asperoteuthis nesisi =

Conservation status
- Data Deficient (IUCN 3.1)

Scientific classification
- Domain: Eukaryota
- Kingdom: Animalia
- Phylum: Mollusca
- Class: Cephalopoda
- Order: Oegopsida
- Family: Chiroteuthidae
- Genus: Asperoteuthis
- Species: A. nesisi

Binomial name
- Asperoteuthis nesisi Arkhipkin & Laptikhovsky, 2008

Species of squid

Asperoteuthis nesisi is a chiroteuthid squid of the genus Asperoteuthis. It is native to the waters off South Georgia and, more generally, the Southwest Atlantic. Asperoteuthis nesisi has a thin mantle and arms, and peculiar integumental tubercles on its head and mantle. The largest arm suckers possess twelve to fourteen sharp, triangular teeth.
