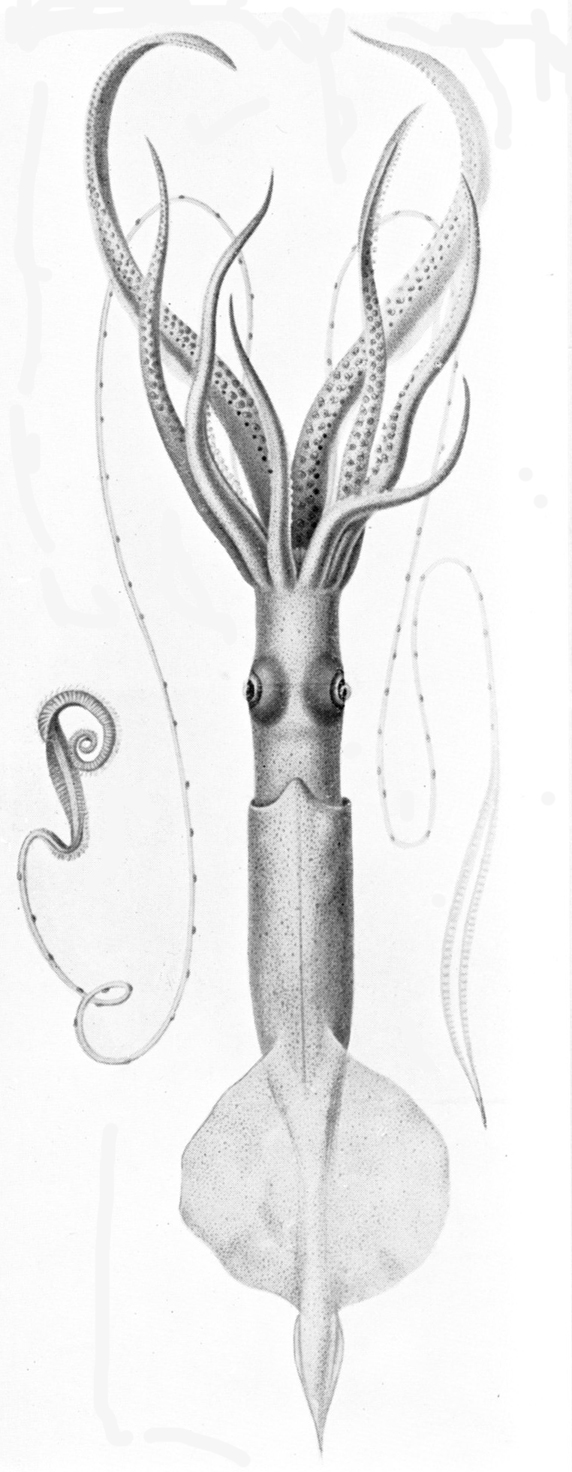

Scientific classification
- Kingdom: Animalia
- Phylum: Mollusca
- Class: Cephalopoda
- Order: Oegopsida
- Family: Chiroteuthidae
- Genus: Chiroteuthis
- Species: C. imperator

Binomial name
- Chiroteuthis imperator Chun, 1908

= Chiroteuthis imperator =

Species of squid

Chiroteuthis imperator, or the emperor squid, is a species of chiroteuthid squid. It lives off the coast of Sumatra in the Indo-Pacific Ocean. It grows to a mantle length of 30 cm (12 in), and has incredibly long arms which give it a total length of probably 1.6 m (5 ft 3 in).
