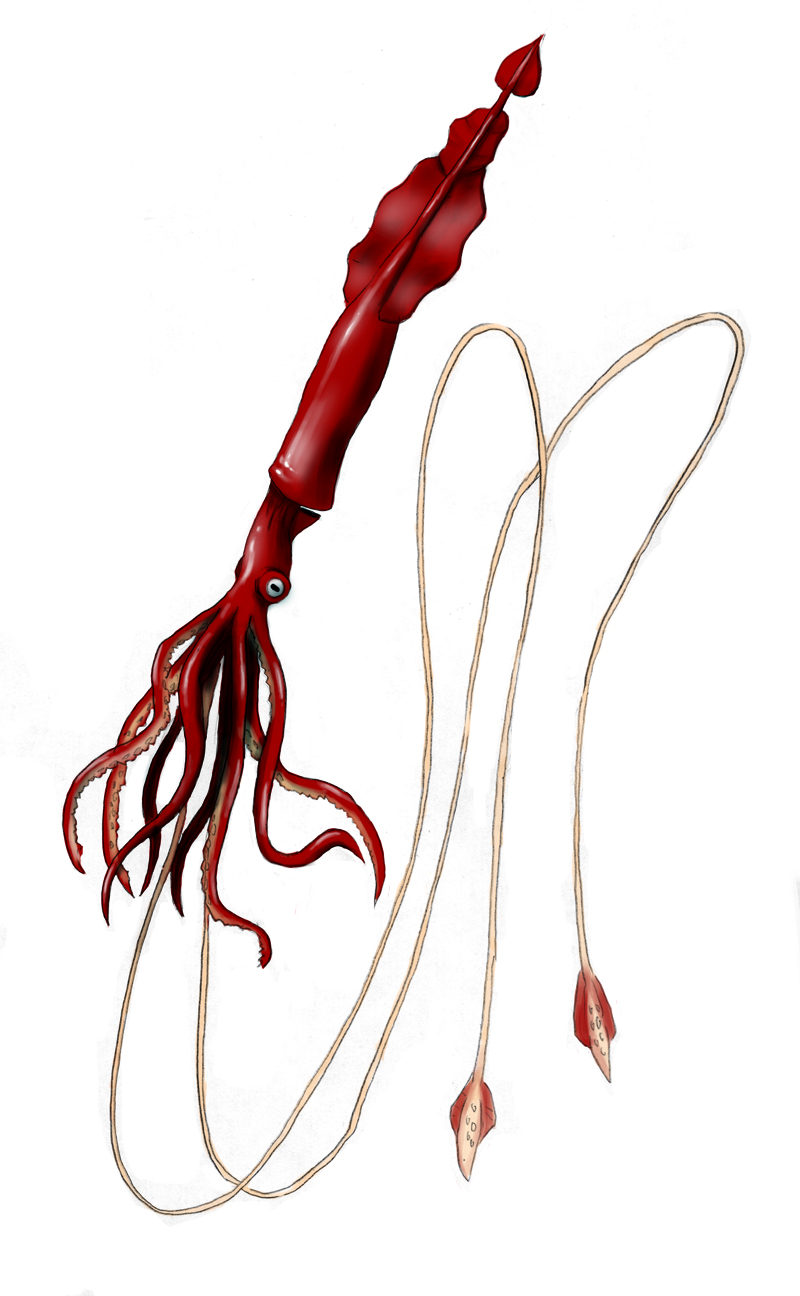
- Asperoteuthis acanthoderma

Scientific classification
- Domain: Eukaryota
- Kingdom: Animalia
- Phylum: Mollusca
- Class: Cephalopoda
- Order: Oegopsida
- Family: Chiroteuthidae
- Genus: Asperoteuthis; Nesis, 1980

Type species
- Chiroteuthis acanthoderma Lu, 1977

Species
- see text

= Asperoteuthis =

Genus of squids

Asperoteuthis is a genus of chiroteuthid squid comprising four species:

- Asperoteuthis acanthoderma Lu, 1977
- Asperoteuthis lui Salcedo-Vargas, 1999
- Asperoteuthis mangoldae Young, Vecchione & Roper, 2007
- Asperoteuthis nesisi Arkhipkin & Laptikhovsky, 2008
