= Katharina Mangold-Wirz =

Swiss marine biologist (1922-2003)

Katharina Maria Mangold-Wirz (23 May 1922 - 22 November 2003) was a Swiss marine biologist and malacologist who worked at Université Pierre et Marie Curie's Laboratoire Arago in Banyuls-sur-Mer, France.

Mangold-Wirz was born Katharina Maria Wirz on 23 May 1922 in Basel to Eduard Wirz (1891–1970), a teacher, historian and writer, and Clara Wirz-Burgin. She graduated from high school in Basel in 1940 and went to Basel University to study medicine with the ambition of being a brain surgeon. Specialists in Switzerland discouraged her from pursuing this ambition as she was "too short, female and appeared frail!" She switched to studying zoology from 1943 to 1948, achieving a D.Phil. with her thesis on non-human brains supervised by Adolf Portmann and published in 1950 in Acta Anatomica. She was awarded a 3-year scholarship at the Janggen-Pöhn Foundation of St Gallen to carry out research on Opisthobranchs from 1950 in Villefranche-sur-Mer and Banyuls-sur-Mer. In 1951 she was appointed as a researcher at the Centre National de la Recherché Scientifique and her focus from then was on the biology of cephalopods. Portmann was her mentor until he died in 1982.

In 1958 she married Walter Mangold, in 1961 was awarded the Doctorat ès Sciences (Doctorat d'état) from the University of Paris, and had her thesis published in Vie et Meileu. In that year she was also promoted to Research Fellow at the Centre National de la Recherché Scientifique, and in 1966 she was appointed as a Senior Researcher. In 1969 overseas recognition came with her appointment as a visiting Research Professor at the Memorial University of Newfoundland. Further recognition came in 1983 when she was elected as the first president of the Cephalopod International Advisory Council at their meeting in Banyuls-sur-Mer. She continued as an active scientist after retiring from academia in 1987. In 1989 she co-authored the cephalopod volume of the textbook with Grassé, Traité du Zoologie and in 1993 was appointed an honorary life member of the Cephalopod International Advisory Council. She died in Basel on 22 November 2003.

The octopus Microeledone mangoldi and the squid Asperoteuthis mangoldae are named in her honour.
