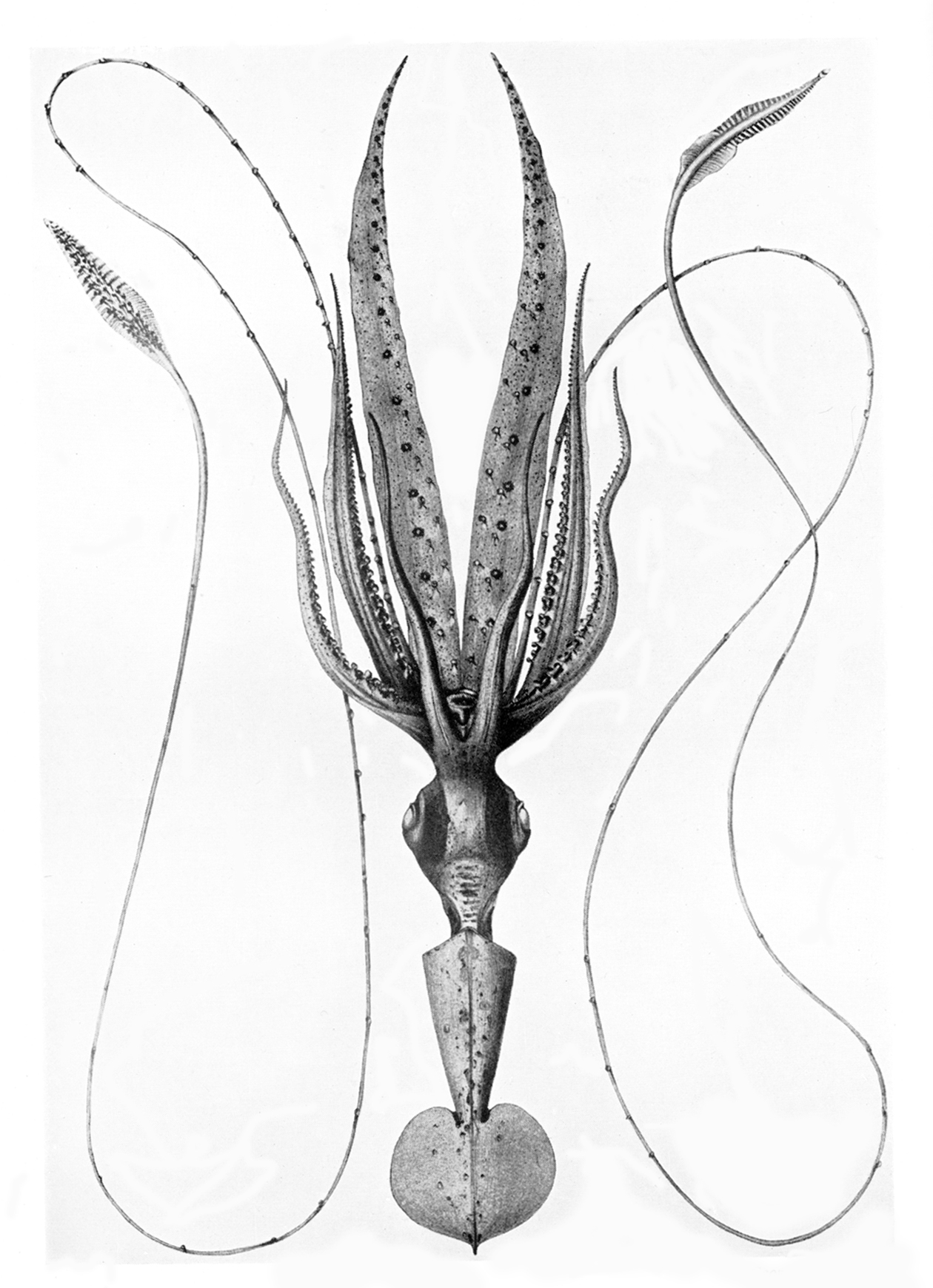

Conservation status
- Least Concern (IUCN 3.1)

Scientific classification
- Kingdom: Animalia
- Phylum: Mollusca
- Class: Cephalopoda
- Order: Oegopsida
- Family: Chiroteuthidae
- Genus: Chiroteuthis
- Species: C. veranii

Binomial name
- Chiroteuthis veranii (Férussac, 1835)

Subspecies
- C. v. lacertosa Verrill, 1881; C. v. veranii (Férussac, 1834)

Synonyms
- Loligopsis veranii Férussac, 1834; Chiroteuthis veranyi (Férussac, 1834); Loligopsis vermicolaris Rüppell, 1844; Loligopsis perlatus Risso, 1854; Chiroteuthis lacertosa Verrill, 1881; Chiroteuthis diaphana (Verrill, 1884); Leptoteuthis diaphana Verrill, 1884

= Chiroteuthis veranii =

Long-armed squid

Species of squid

Chiroteuthis veranii, commonly known as the long-armed squid, is a species of chiroteuthid squid. It grows to a mantle length of 12.5 cm (4.9 in) and a total length of 130 cm (51 in).

The type specimen was collected in the Mediterranean Sea by Jean Baptiste Vérany and is deposited at the Muséum d'histoire naturelle de Nice in Nice, France.

To wield its exceptionally long arms, this squid species builds up internal fluid pressure by contracting its muscles, which allows it to expel two long tentacles at a high speed in order to catch prey.

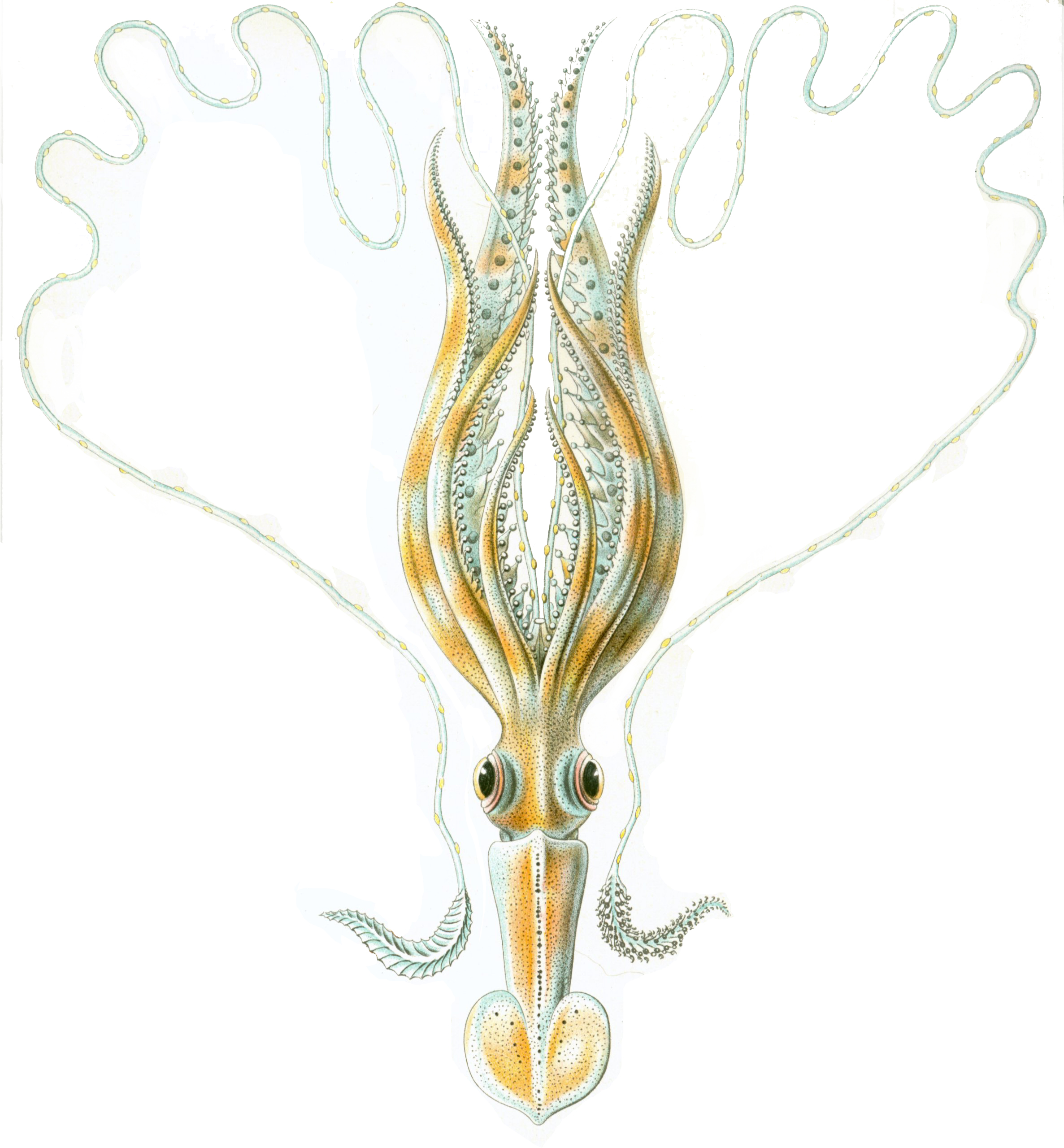
Chiroteuthis veranyi by Ernst Haeckel
