= Asperoteuthis acanthoderma =

- A specimen of A. acanthoderma found floating at the surface off Little Cayman in May 2008. The squid measured over 7 feet (2.1 m) in length.

Conservation status
- Least Concern (IUCN 3.1)

Scientific classification
- Kingdom: Animalia
- Phylum: Mollusca
- Class: Cephalopoda
- Order: Oegopsida
- Family: Chiroteuthidae
- Genus: Asperoteuthis
- Species: A. acanthoderma

Binomial name
- Asperoteuthis acanthoderma (Lu, 1977)

Synonyms
- Asperoteuthis famelica Berry, 1909; Chiroteuthis acanthoderma Lu, 1977; ? Mastigoteuthis B Clarke, 1980

Species of squid

Asperoteuthis acanthoderma, the thorny whiplash squid, is a large species of squid belonging to the family Chiroteuthidae. It is characterised by the tiny, pointed tubercules present on its skin and a Y-shaped groove in the funnel locking apparatus.

The largest recorded specimen measured 78 cm (2.56 ft) in mantle length (ML), although its original total length is unknown as it was missing the very delicate feeding tentacles. A smaller specimen, 45 cm (1.48 ft) ML, had tentacles 12 times the length of its mantle, giving a total length of almost 5.5 m (18 ft). This makes A. acanthoderma one of the longest known cephalopods.

The type specimen of A. acanthoderma was collected in the Celebes Sea and is deposited at the Zoologisk Museum of Københavns Universitet in Copenhagen. A. acanthoderma is also known from waters off the Cayman Islands, the Florida Keys, Okinawa, and Hawaii.

The first known specimen from the Atlantic Ocean was found by a charter fisherman while floating in 250 m (820 ft) deep water off the southern coast of Key West, Florida on 20 February 2007. It measured 73 cm (2.40 ft) ML and is thought to have been 4.9 to 7.3 m (16 to 24 ft) long when intact. Although an incomplete specimen, missing most of its tentacles, it weighed 6 kg (13 lb) and measured 2 m (6.6 ft) in total length.

In 2007, teuthologist Richard E. Young stated that "probably fewer than 10" specimens of A. acanthoderma had ever been reported. However, since 2006 there has been an influx of new specimens from the Caribbean Basin and Atlantic. Four specimens were recorded between 2006 and 2007 (two from the Florida Keys, one off Grand Cayman, and one off Little Cayman). This was followed by another specimen from Little Cayman in May 2008 and another from Grand Cayman in September 2009. A large specimen around 2 m (6.6 ft) long was found floating at the surface off the Cayman Islands in 2013. It was transported to the University of South Florida St. Petersburg on a Royal Caribbean cruise and later transferred to the National Museum of Natural History in Washington, D.C.

This squid is known to be eaten by the sperm whale, blue shark, silky shark, swordfish, and wandering albatross.

== See also ==
- Cephalopod size
