= Muséum d'histoire naturelle de Nice =

Natural History Museum of Nice
- French: Muséum d'histoire naturelle de Nice
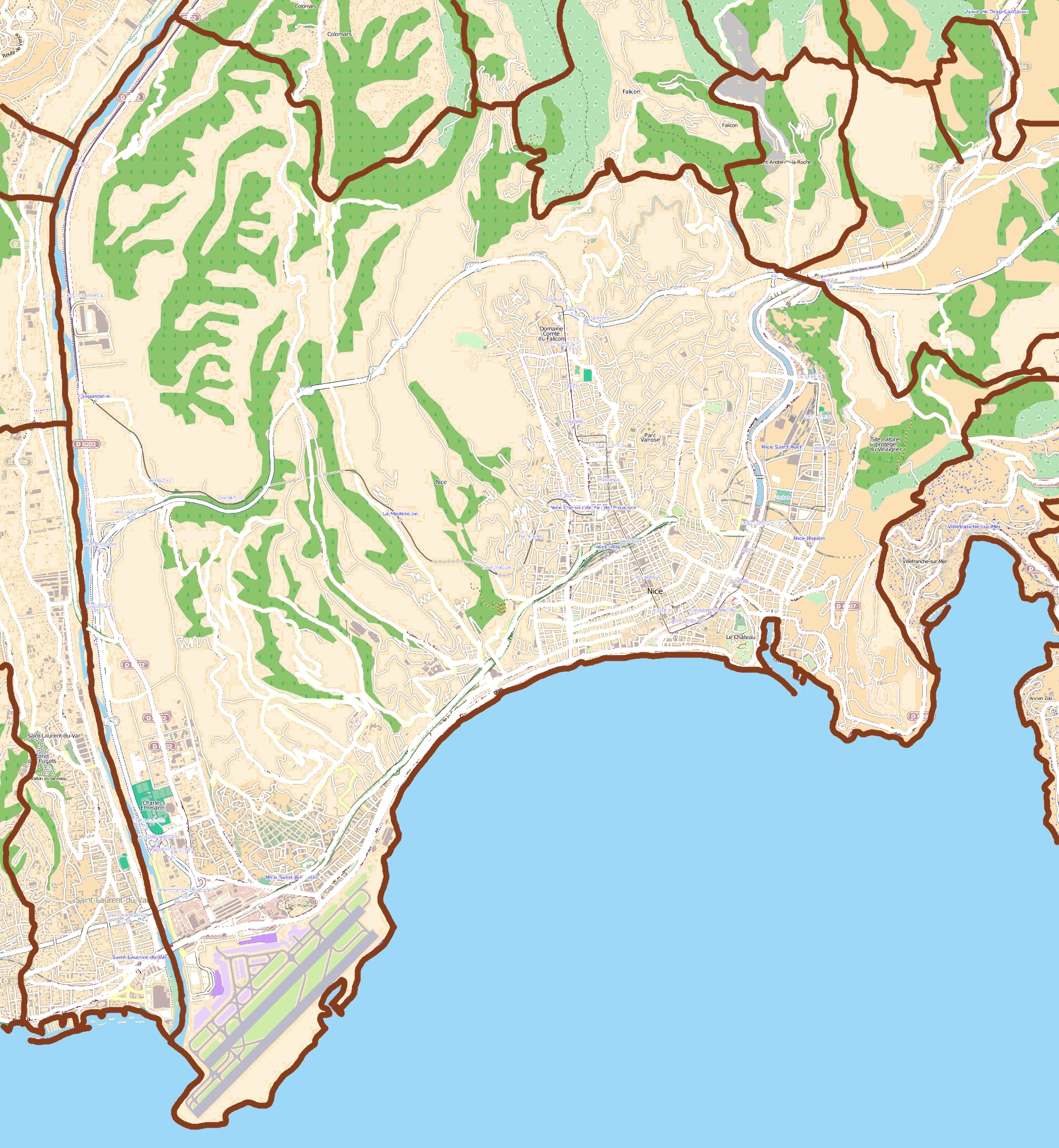
- Location within Nice
- Established: 1846
- Location: 60 du boulevard Risso, Place Garibaldi; Nice, France
- Coordinates: 43.701667°N 7.279444°E
- Type: Natural-history museum
- Website: mhnnice.org (in French)

The Natural History Museum of Nice (French: Muséum d'histoire naturelle de Nice) is a French natural-history museum located in Nice.

== Origins ==
The museum was founded in 1846 by Jean Baptiste Vérany (1800–1865), a French pharmacist and naturalist who specialized in the study of cephalopods, and Jean-Baptiste Barla (1817–1896), a French botanist.

== Collections ==
It has extensive collections mainly from the Mediterranean region but also from Africa, the Indian Ocean and South America.

Currently, following the upgrading of the exhibition halls, only the museum space built at the beginning of the 20th century is open to the public and constitutes the establishment's permanent exhibition hall. Periodically, a few temporary exhibitions are scheduled at Parc Phœnix, at the Louis-Nucéra library, at the Maison de la nature in the Grande Corniche departmental park. The museum was to be relocated to a future Cité des Sciences et de la Nature, including a new building for the museum and the Phoenix Park, with an opening scheduled for 2013. The project has been postponed indefinitely.

== Location ==
The museum's address is 60 du boulevard Risso, just behind Place Garibaldi near the MAMAC (Musée d'Art Moderne et d'Art Contemporain), Nice, France.

== See also ==
- List of museums in France
- List of natural history museums
