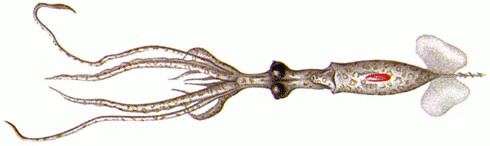
- Planctoteuthis sp.

Scientific classification
- Kingdom: Animalia
- Phylum: Mollusca
- Class: Cephalopoda
- Order: Oegopsida
- Superfamily: Chiroteuthoidea
- Family: Chiroteuthidae; Gray, 1849

Genera
- Asperoteuthis; Chiroteuthis; Grimalditeuthis; Planctoteuthis; New Genus B New Genus C

= Chiroteuthidae =

Family of squids

The Chiroteuthidae are a family of deep-sea squid, generally small to medium in size, rather soft and gelatinous, and slow moving. They are found in most temperate and tropical oceans, but are known primarily from the North Atlantic, North Pacific, and Indo-Pacific. The family is represented by approximately 12 species and four subspecies in four genera, two of which are monotypic. They are sometimes known collectively as whip-lash squid, but this common name is also applied to the Mastigoteuthidae, which are sometimes treated as a subfamily (Mastigoteuthinae) of Chiroteuthidae.

The monotypic genus Grimalditeuthis was once (and may still be) given its own family, Grimalditeuthidae. Generally speaking, chiroteuthids are not well represented by described specimens, because they are so often damaged during capture.

== Description ==
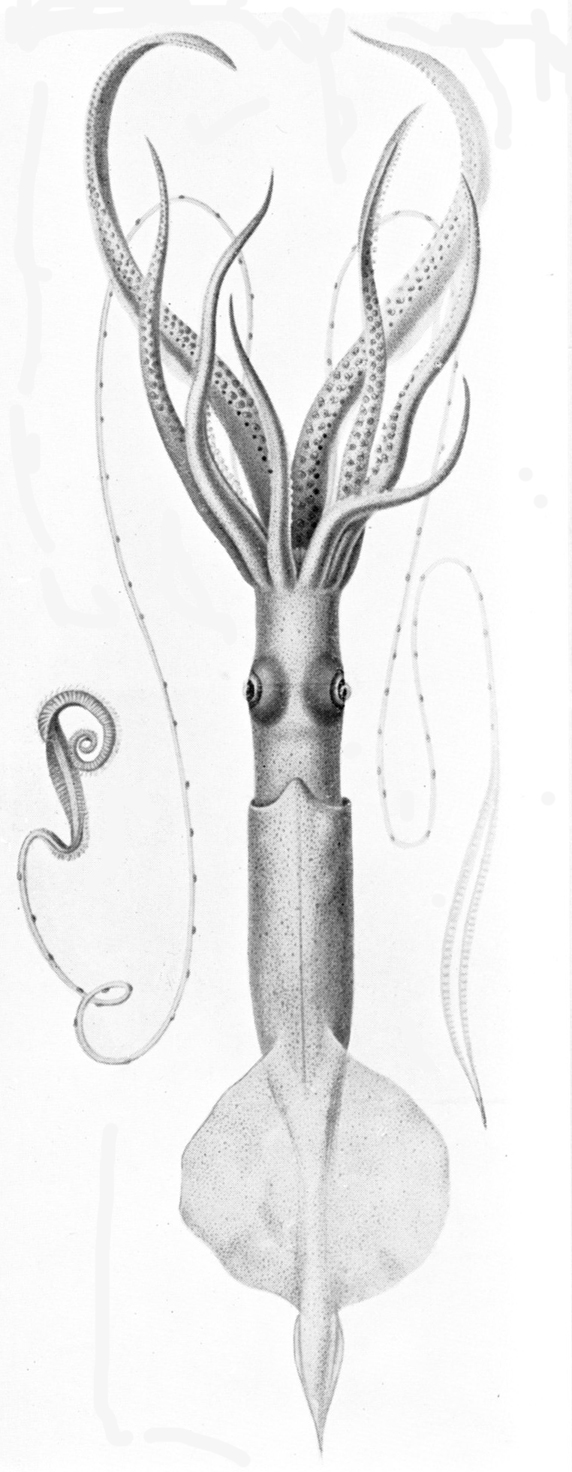
Chiroteuthis imperator

The Chiroteuthidae are most notable for their unique paralarval stage, known as the doratopsis stage. Although morphology varies greatly within the family, the Chiroteuthidae are distinguished by their extremely elongated bodies and (in most species) tentacles; the latter may be up to four times the mantle length in Asperoteuthis acanthoderma. The head is atop an elongated neck and the brachial pillar is well-developed, the eyes are large; in some Planctoteuthis and all Chiroteuthis species, the fourth pair of arms possess both greater girth and length than the other arms. The fragile, gelatinous body is conical and the neck cylindrical; the fins range from oval to elliptical, about 50% of the mantle length. The suckers of the arms occur in two series, and those of the clubs in four (but are absent in subadult Grimalditeuthis and absent proximally in Asperoteuthis). The club is elongated and—with the exception of Planctoteuthis species—is subdivided by symmetrical, protective membranes into two or three parts.

The funnel locking apparatus is oval; its cartilage is ear-shaped with one or two projections and a central depression. In Grilmalditeuthis, the apparatus is fused (but nuchal articulation is free); in Chiroteuthis both the tragus and antitragus are present, while in Planctoteuthis, only the antitragus is present. Also absent in Planctoteuthis are the funnel valve, tentacle pads, and distal suckers on the fourth arms.

Some species (excluding Planctoteuthis) are bioluminescent, with photophores (light-producing organs) variably present on the inner surface of the ventral arms, on the ventral surface of the eyes (one to three patches or bands), on the ink sac, and near the club terminus. A number of chambers containing ammonium chloride are contained within the arms, head, and mantle. With a lower density than the surrounding seawater, the ammonium chloride helps chiroteuthids to conserve energy reserved for swimming by maintaining the body's neutral buoyancy. The eyelid sinus is indistinct, occipital folds are absent, and long stalks support the olfactory papillae. The largest species reach a mantle length of about 78 cm. Body coloration is typically beige to sepia, but Asperoteuthis acanthoderma is noted for its deep violet color.

== Life history ==
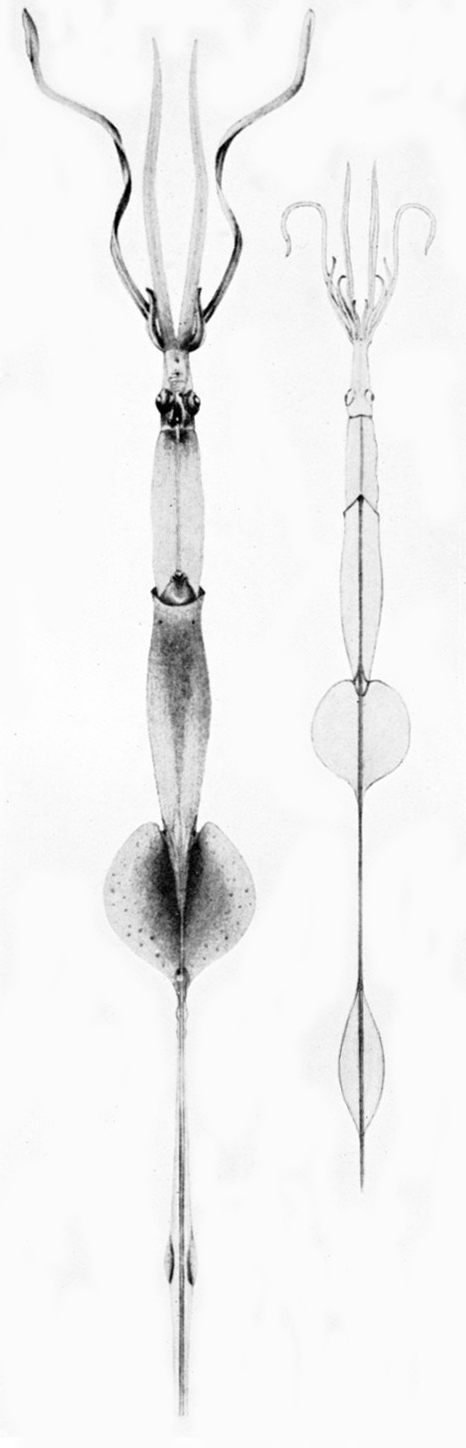
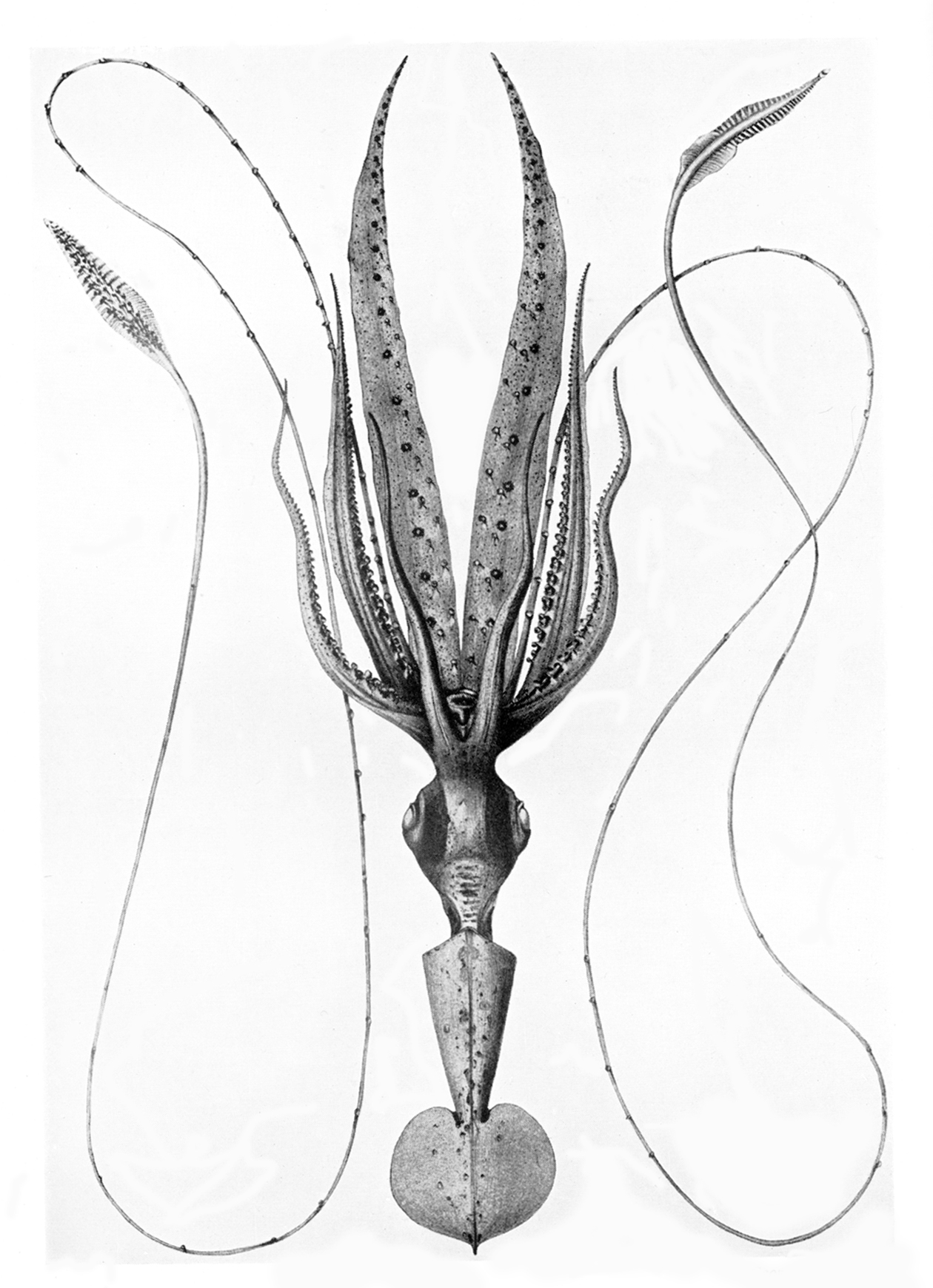
Left: Immature specimens of Chiroteuthis veranyi: In this paralarval form, the pen is longer than the mantle and 'neck' combined
Right: A mature Chiroteuthis veranyi: This species has some of the longest tentacles in proportion to its size of any known cephalopod.

Little is known of chiroteuthid reproduction. The distinctive doratopsis paralarvae are thought to remain within the first few hundred meters of the water column, where they likely feed on zooplankton and slowly undergo a marked transformation to subadults. During the doratopsis stage, the paralarval chiroteuthid possesses a greatly elongated gladius (internal shell) extending well beyond the fins; this supports a long, trailing, tail-like structure that is further adorned with—depending on the species—either a pair of large oval or heart-shaped "secondary fins", a series of small flaps running the length of the tail, or a series of oval "bulbs" made buoyant by low-density fluids. Some species' paralarvae also have eyes projecting ventrally. The elongated neck and brachial pillar are chambered, and vesicular tissue is present in the posterior end of the mantle and (in advanced stages) in the arms.

Although lost during maturation in most species, some adults (e.g., Grimalditeuthis) retain their tails. During the paralarva's transformation into a subadult, its arms also become elongated (but remain subequal in some species) along with other changes in body proportions; photophores are developed, and the paralarval club is resorbed and replaced with an adult form. Planctoteuthis species retain their paralarval clubs; together with a lack of photophores, this feature causes some authors to suggest Planctoteuthis species are actually mature doratopsids, arising from neoteny. The time frame of the doratopsis stage, including the onset or loss of specific features, is unknown.

== Species ==
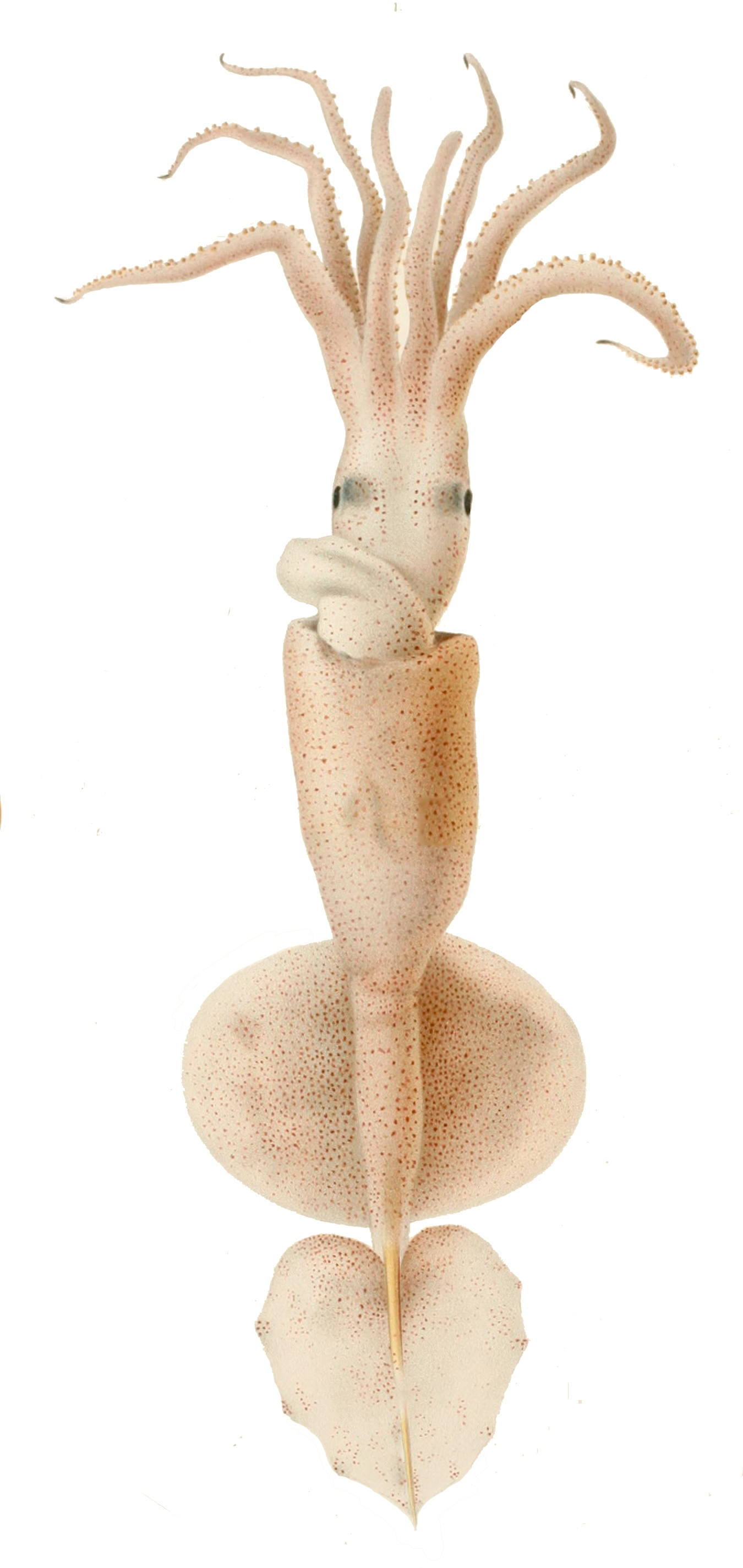
Grimalditeuthis bonplandi

- Genus Asperoteuthis
  - Asperoteuthis acanthoderma
  - Asperoteuthis lui
  - Asperoteuthis mangoldae
  - Asperoteuthis nesisi
- Genus Chiroteuthis
  - Chiroteuthis sp. B2
  - Subgenus Chiroteuthis
    - Chiroteuthis calyx
    - Chiroteuthis joubini
    - Chiroteuthis spoeli
    - Chiroteuthis veranyi, long-armed squid
      - Chiroteuthis veranyi lacertosa
      - Chiroteuthis veranyi veranyi
  - Subgenus Chirothauma
    - Chiroteuthis atlanticus *
    - Chiroteuthis imperator
    - Chiroteuthis mega
    - Chiroteuthis picteti
      - Chiroteuthis picteti picteti
      - Chiroteuthis picteti somaliensis
- Genus Grimalditeuthis
  - Grimalditeuthis bonplandi
- Genus Planctoteuthis
  - Planctoteuthis danae
  - Planctoteuthis exopthalmica
  - Planctoteuthis levimana
  - Planctoteuthis lippula
  - Planctoteuthis oligobessa
- Genus "New Genus B"
- Genus "New Genus C"

The species listed above with an asterisk (*) is questionable and needs further study to determine if it is a valid species or a synonym.
