= Jean Baptiste Vérany =

French pharmacist and zoologist

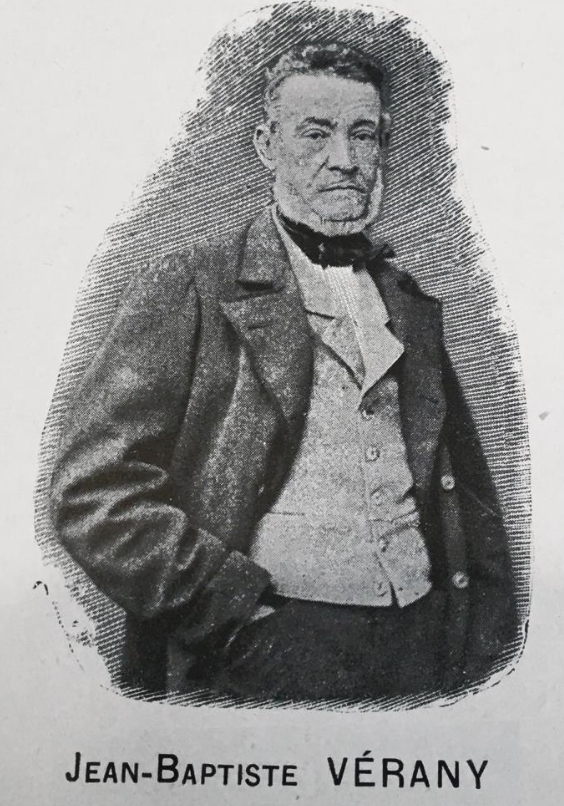
Jean Baptiste Vérany (1800s)

Chevalier Jean Baptiste Vérany (28 February 1800, in Nice – 1 March 1865) was a French pharmacist and naturalist who specialised in the study of cephalopods. He was also a talented scientific illustrator, known for his depictions of cephalopods.

== Life and work ==
Vérany was born in Nice to pharmacist Trophime and Thérèse Vérany. He went to the University of Torino to follow his father's profession and became a pharmacist in 1819 and returned to work with his father. He had attended the course of Georges Cuvier in Paris and was closely associated with the Turin zoology professor Franco Bonelli for whom he collected specimens. He also collaborated with Rudolf Wagner of the University of Erlangen. In 1826 he left the pharmacy business and became an assayer of gold and silver while also working on natural history. In 1836 he went on an expedition to South America aboard the Euridice. He examined sea organisms including squids during this period and also collected some bird specimens from Brazil and Paraguay. He began to illustrate the cephalopods from around 1839, describing six new species from the Mediterranean caught near Nice. His illustrations became more well known when they were included in Férussac and d'Orbigny's "Histoire naturelle etparticulière des Céphalopodes Acétabuiféres" (1835-1848) which had 144 plates of which five were made by Vérany, drawn from the living animals and in colour. His last art work was made in 1862. Vérany's illustrations were used by the Blaschka glass model makers and probably also inspired the illustrations of Ernst Haeckel. His illustration of an octopus also inspired Victor Hugo who wrote a novel in 1866 Les Travailleurs de la mer which helped create the mythical monster octopus.

In 1846, with Jean-Baptiste Barla (1817–1896), he founded the Muséum d'histoire naturelle de Nice. Vérany discovered and described many species. André Étienne d'Audebert de Férussac named Chiroteuthis veranyi for him. He died of an "apoplectic attack".

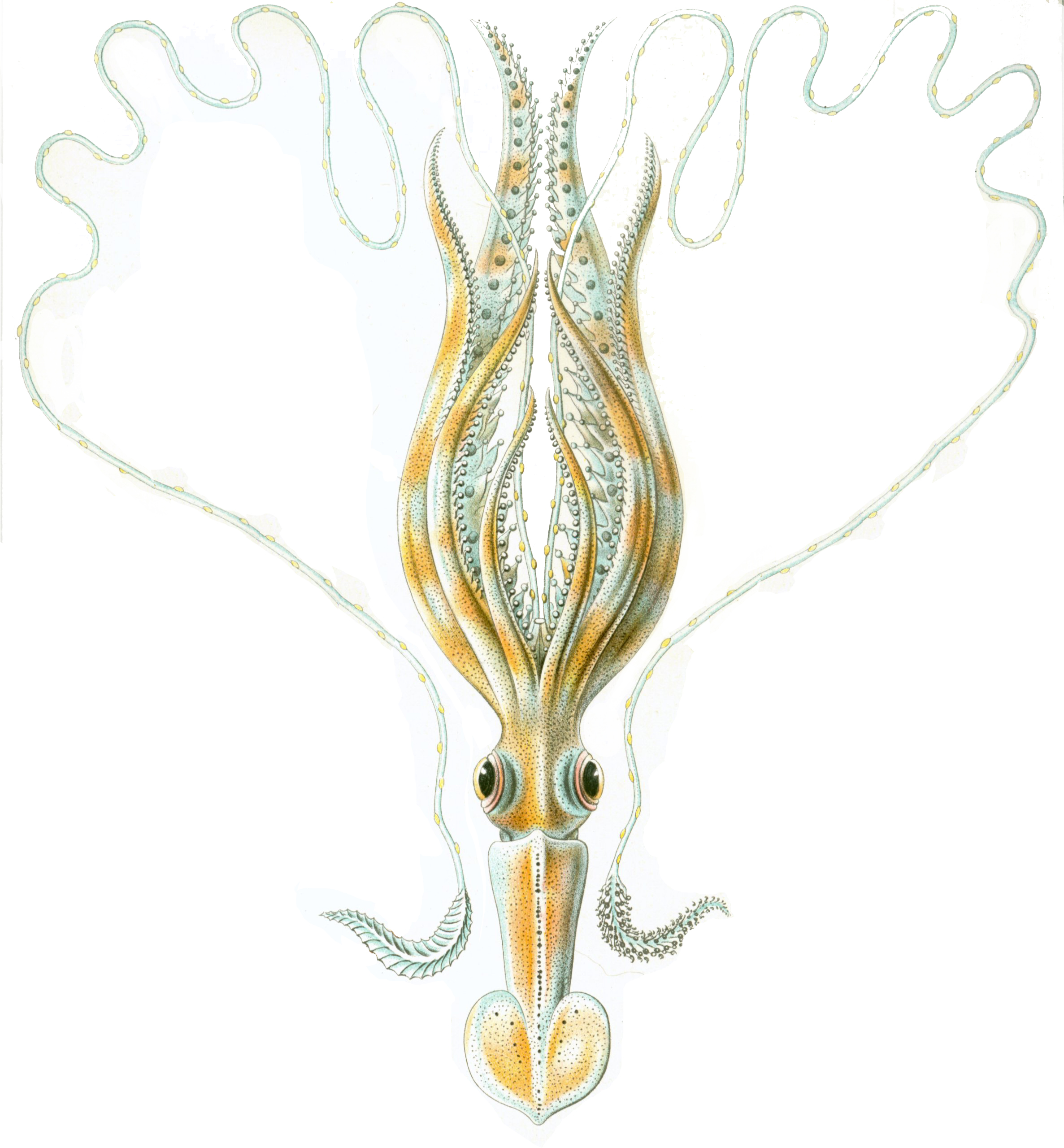
Chiroteuthis veranii

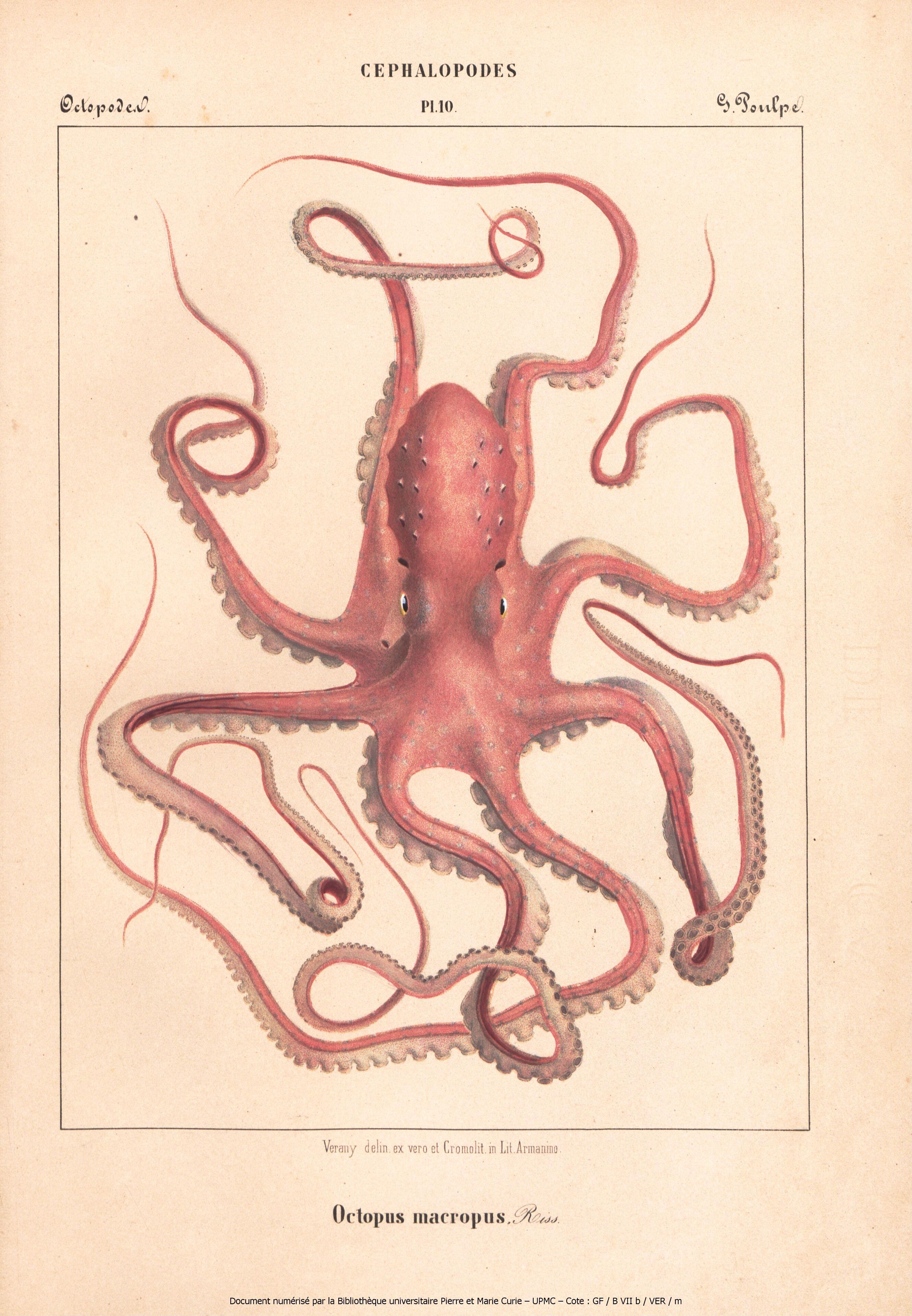
Callistoctopus macropus

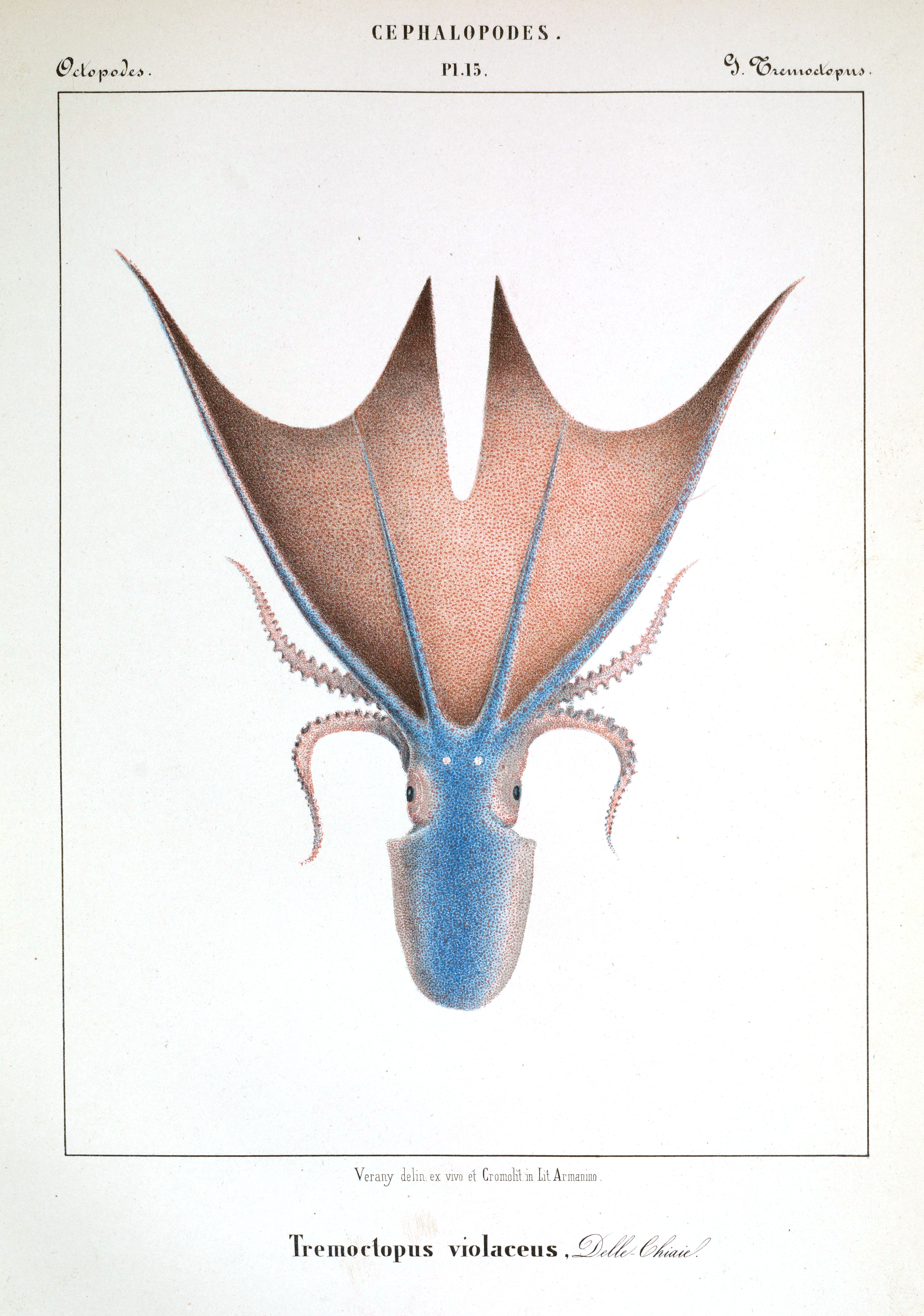
Tremoctopus violaceus

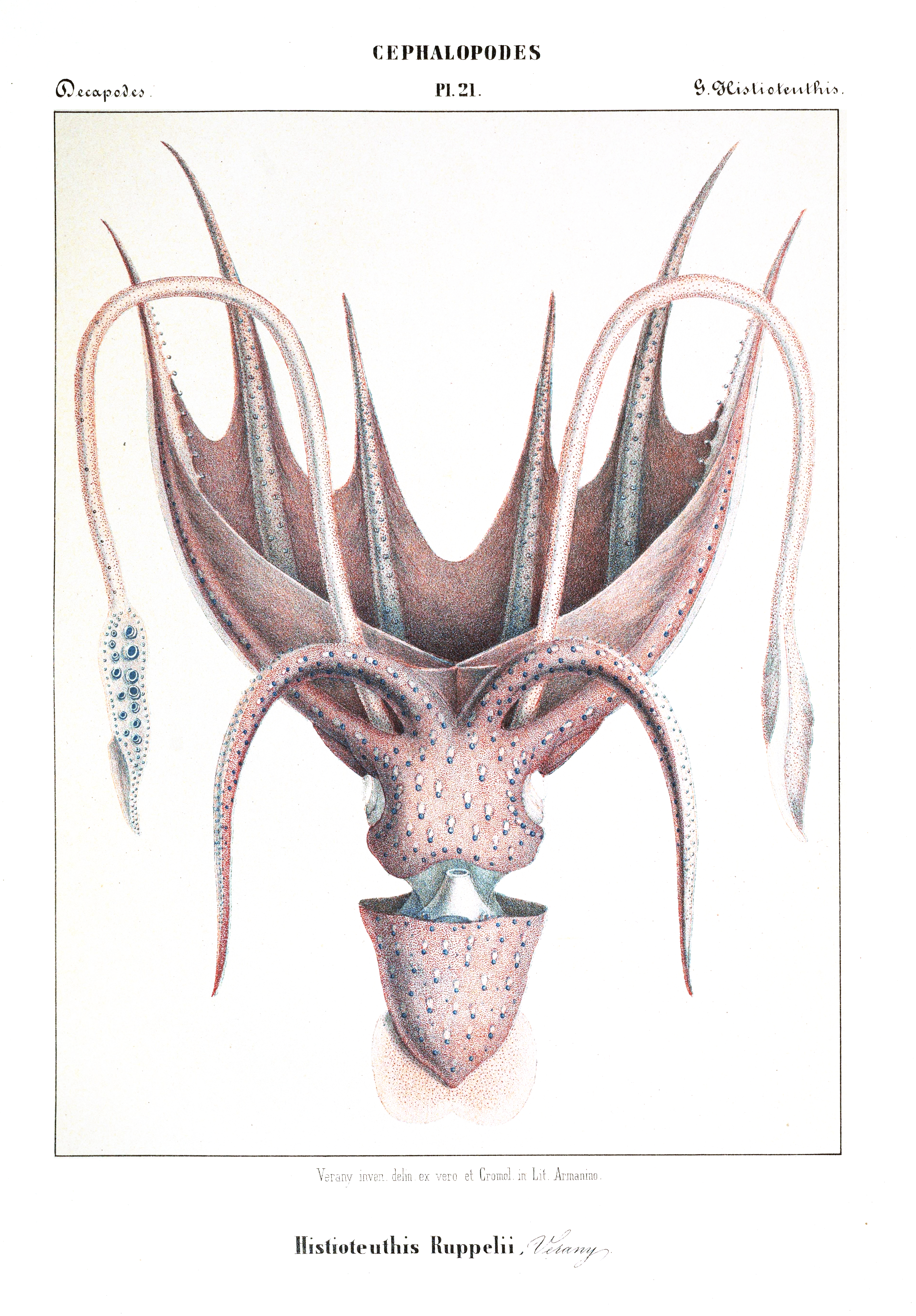
Histioteuthis bonnellii

== Works ==
Partial list:

- 1842 – Illustrations. Isis von Oken, pp. 252–253.
- 1844 – Description de deux genres nouveaux de mollusques nudibranches. Revue Zoologique par la Societe Cuvierienne, pp. 302–303.
- 1845 – Janus spinolae. Guerin Magazin de Zoologie, series 2, 7:121-122, pl. 136.
- 1846 – Descrizione di Genova e del Genovesato 1(2): Regno Animale Molluschi, pp. 90–110, pls. 2-4.
- 1846 – Catalogo degli animali invertebrati marini del golfo di Genova e Nizza. Est. dulla Guida di Genova 3: 1-30
- 1849 – Description d'un nouveau genre et d'une nouvelle espece de Mollusque. Revue et Magazin de Zoologie pure et appliquee (2), 1:593-594, pl. 17.
- 1850 – Lomanotus, eine neue Gattung und Art Molluske. Tagsberichte uber die Fortschritte der Natur- und Heilkunde, Abth. fur zoologie und palaeontologie 1(16):89-96.
- 1853 – Catalogue des Mollusques cephalopodes, pteropodes, Gasteropodes nudibranches, etc. des environs de Nice. Journal de Conchyliologie 4:375-392.
- 1862 – Zoologie des Alpes-Maritimes. Statistique générale du département par J. Roux.
- 1862 – Zoologie des Alpes-Maritimes ou catalogue des animaux observes dans la département, Nice, Imprimerie et Librairie Ch. Cauvin, pp. 1–102. Nudibranchia pp. 86–90.
- 1851 – Céphalopodes de la Méditerranée. Mollusques Méditerranéens Observes, Decrits, Figures et Chromolithographies a apres le vivant ouvrage dedii ASM le roi Charles Albert, I:1-132.
- 1865 – Notice sur les Mollusques Nudibranches et description des six nouvelles Eolides de la Mediterranee. Annales de la Societe des Lettres, Sciences et Arts des Alpes-Maritimes 1:241-252.
