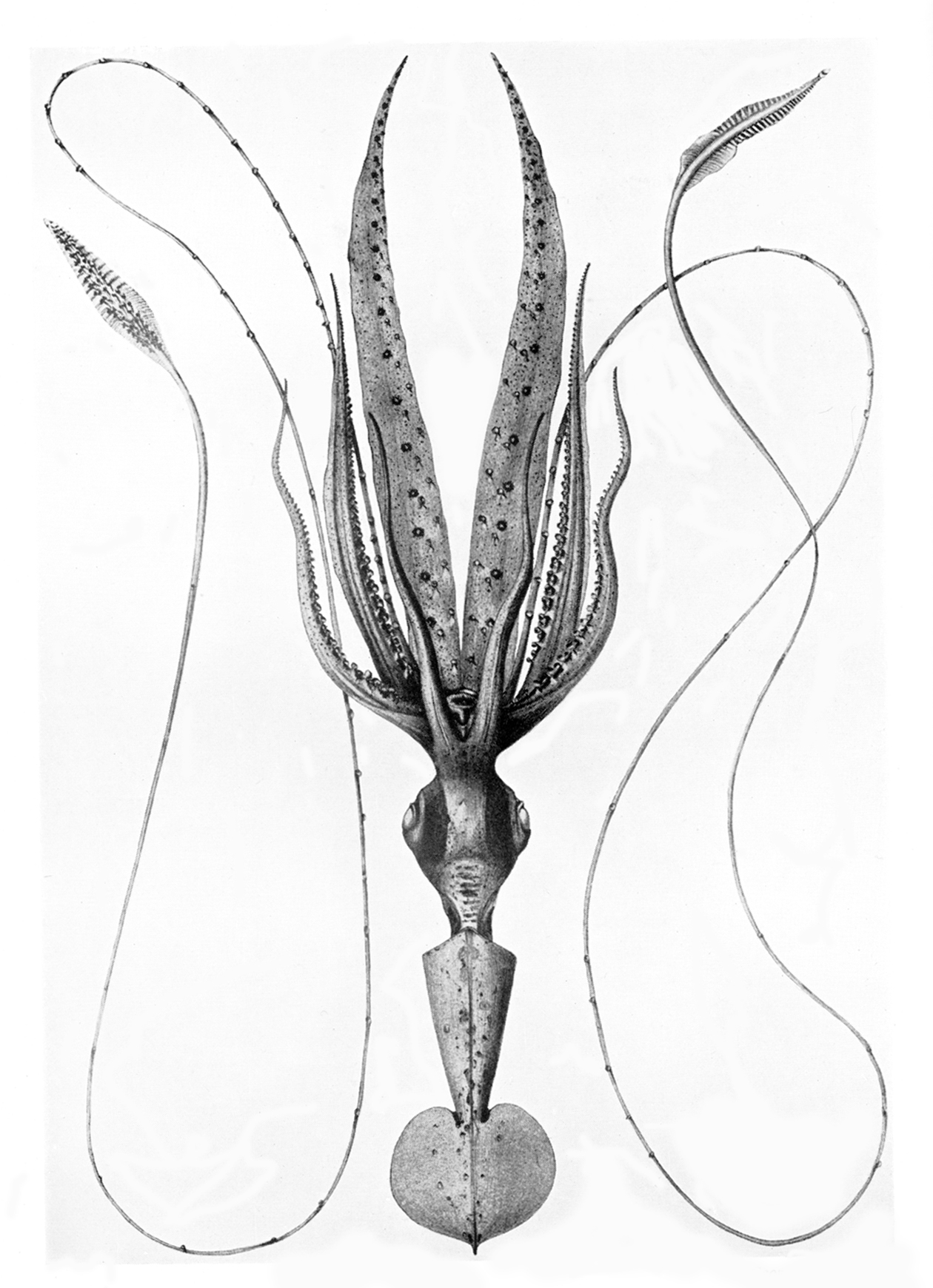
- Chiroteuthis veranyi

Scientific classification
- Domain: Eukaryota
- Kingdom: Animalia
- Phylum: Mollusca
- Class: Cephalopoda
- Order: Oegopsida
- Family: Chiroteuthidae
- Genus: Chiroteuthis; Orbigny, 1841

Type species
- Loligopsis veranii de Férussac, 1834

Species
- See text

= Chiroteuthis =

Genus of squids

Chiroteuthis is a genus of chiroteuthid squid, comprising two subgenera. The hectocotylus is absent from all members of the genus; instead, a penis extending from the mantle opening is utilised. The genus is characterised by enlarged, lidded photophores present at the end of the tentacular club. Arms IV are both the longest and thickest, their membranes acting as sheaths to the retractable tentacles.

== Species ==
  - Chiroteuthis sp. B2
  - Subgenus Chiroteuthis
    - Chiroteuthis calyx
    - Chiroteuthis joubini
    - Chiroteuthis spoeli
    - Chiroteuthis veranyi, long-armed squid
      - Chiroteuthis veranyi lacertosa
      - Chiroteuthis veranyi veranyi
  - Subgenus Chirothauma
    - Chiroteuthis atlanticus *
    - Chiroteuthis imperator
    - Chiroteuthis mega
    - Chiroteuthis picteti
      - Chiroteuthis picteti picteti
      - Chiroteuthis picteti somaliensis

The species listed above with an asterisk (*) is questionable and needs further study to determine if it is a valid species or a synonym.
