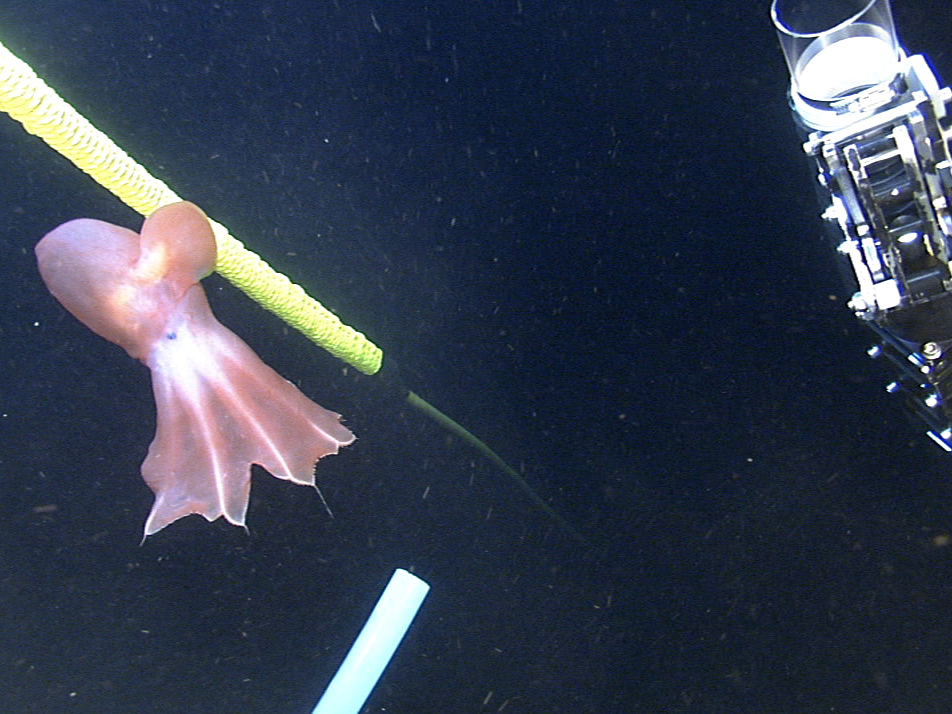
- Cirroteuthis muelleri observed during the Arctic 2005 Exploration, NOAA-OE

Scientific classification
- Kingdom: Animalia
- Phylum: Mollusca
- Class: Cephalopoda
- Order: Octopoda
- Family: Cirroteuthidae
- Genus: Cirroteuthis; Eschricht, 1838

Type species
- Cirroteuthis muelleri Eschricht, 1838

Species
- Cirroteuthis muelleri Eschricht, 1838 Cirroteuthis kirrilyae Verhoeff & O'Shea, 2025

Synonyms
- Sciadephorus Reinhardt and Prosch, 1846

= Cirroteuthis =

Genus of octopuses

Cirroteuthis is a genus of cirrate octopus containing two species. It was the first genus (and contains the first species) of cirrate octopus to be described (in 1838). It is closely related to the genus Cirrothauma within the family Cirroteuthidae.

The type species (C. muelleri) is restricted to the Arctic Ocean and far North Atlantic. Specimens from the Pacific, Indian Ocean and southern hemisphere, which have been referred to as the big-finned jellyhead or C. cf. muelleri, have recently been attributed to a separate species Cirroteuthis kirrilyae Verhoeff & O'Shea, 2025 (based on both morphological and molecular data).

== Description ==
Cirroteuthis muelleri can reach a maximum length of 400 mm (mantle length 170 mm). Statements that C. muelleri reaches up to 1.5 m total length are erroneous (and involve unidentified Cirrothauma, then regarded as Cirroteuthis sp., being mistakenly assumed to be C. muelleri). It is off white or pale purple, with the inner side of the arms and the webs being brownish-purple.

The head has well developed eyes with lenses. The upper and lower beaks are thin and relatively weak. The body is gelatinous and fragile. The arms are nearly equal in length. Extensive webbing connects between the arms, with a 'secondary web' also present (a diagnostic feature of the family), near the arm tips a fleshy web nodule acts as the web attachment point on each ventral arm edge. The number of suckers differentiate the two known species, C. muelleri has around 28-34 suckers per arm (even on the largest specimens), while C. kirrilyae has 36-39 suckers per arm. The first 7 or 8 suckers are cup-shaped and raised on thick stalks, numbers 2 and 3 being the largest. There are a further 30 or so smaller suckers with delicate stalks. Between the suckers are conspicuous cirri up to 19 mm (0.75 in) long. These are elongate, fleshy tendrils set along the sides of the oral surface of the arms, the longest being in the mid-arm region. Both the suckers and the cirri do not extend as far as the tip of the arm.

The fins are elliptical when viewed from the side. They are wide, and longer than the width of the head. The aperture of the mantle is narrow and the funnel is long.

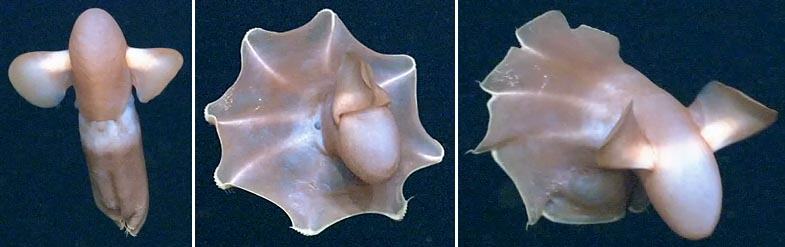
Various views of C. muelleri from a Census of Marine Life cruise to the Canadian Basin

== Distribution ==
Cirroteuthis muelleri is a deep sea species. It is found in cold seas in the boreal Arctic and the far north Atlantic Ocean. Specimens of Cirroteuthis from around Australia, New Zealand, and possibly the central and northeastern Pacific have been allocated to a new species, Cirroteuthis kirrilyae Verhoeff & O'Shea, 2025 (previously referred to Cirroteuthis cf. muelleri).

== Habitat ==
Cirroteuthis muelleri is benthopelagic, meaning it is found swimming or drifting in the 10 m (33 ft) or so immediately above the sea bed. It is usually found at depths of over 2,000 m (6,600 ft). At these depths, practically no light penetrates, the temperature is about 4 °C, and observation is only possible by submersible, which makes these octopuses difficult to collect. Their ecology and biology are little known, but they seem to be fairly common in the seas around Greenland.

== Biology ==
In a study of Arctic cephalopods, three specimens of Cirroteuthis muelleri, all female, were caught near the ocean floor at 3,000–3,300 m (9,800–10,800 ft). The eggs were found to be large and were laid on the bottom, singly. The diet of C. muelleri (from stomach contents of 18 specimens) was found to comprise small crustaceans (Calanoida, Mysidacea, Isopoda) and polychaetes (Polynoidae), all small benthic or epibenthic prey items. The largest mysids consumed were estimated at 14.6 mm long, and the largest polychaete was estimated at 24.3 mm.
