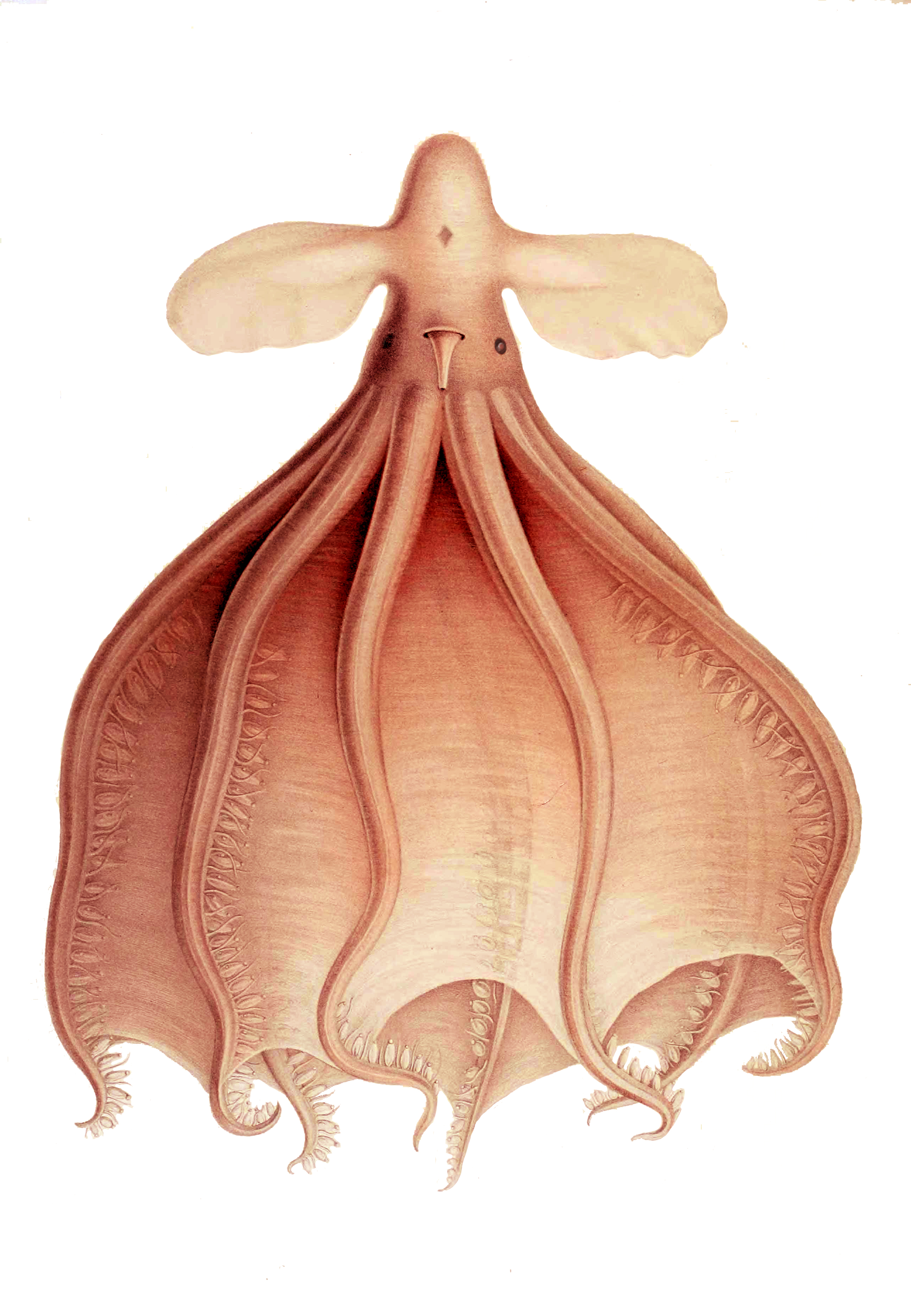
- Cirrothauma murrayi

Scientific classification
- Kingdom: Animalia
- Phylum: Mollusca
- Class: Cephalopoda
- Order: Octopoda
- Family: Cirroteuthidae
- Genus: Cirrothauma; Chun, 1911

Type species
- Cirrothauma murrayi Chun, 1911

= Cirrothauma =

Genus of octopuses

Cirrothauma is a genus of deep water octopuses from the cirrate family Cirroteuthidae. The species of Cirrothauma are fragile, gelatinous deep-sea octopods with a large 'butterfly-shaped' shell.

They are unique in the Octopoda in being blind, with eyes lacking lenses and being imbedded/covered in head tissues. The genus contains a single species Cirrothauma murrayi.

== Species and taxonomy ==
Two other species have formerly been included in Cirrothauma, but have recently been allocated to their own genus (Inopinoteuthis): Inopinoteuthis magna (Hoyle, 1885) and Inopinoteuthis hoylei (Robson, 1932).

Both Cirrothauma and Inopinoteuthis have butterfly-shaped shells, and much longer arms than the related Cirroteuthis. Genera Cirrothauma and Inopinoteuthis can be separated given the presence of well-developed eyes on Inopinoteuthis (vs. vestigial eyes) as well as the presence of functional suckers with suction chambers on Inopinoteuthis (Cirrothauma have minute vestigial suckers atop elongate fleshy stalks across the mid-distal arm regions).

== Range ==
The single recognized species Cirrothauma murrayi has been reported from various locations across the Atlantic, Arctic, and Pacific Oceans, but seemingly not the Southern Ocean.

== Species ==
There is a single currently recognized species within the genus Cirrothauma, though a second (as yet undescribed taxon) is indicated in molecular data.

- Cirrothauma murrayi Chun, 1911
