= Stauroteuthis kengrahami =

Scientific classification
- Kingdom: Animalia
- Phylum: Mollusca
- Class: Cephalopoda
- Order: Octopoda
- Family: Stauroteuthidae
- Genus: Stauroteuthis
- Species: S. kengrahami

Binomial name
- Stauroteuthis kengrahami Verhoeff, 2023

Species of octopus

Stauroteuthis kengrahami is a species of small pelagic cirrate octopus. It is currently only known from off eastern Australia (Tasman Sea).

The species was named after Mr Ken Graham (fisheries research officer and Australian Museum Associate), who collected the only known specimen.

== Description ==
Stauroteuthis kengrahami, is generally similar to the other species in the genus. It is principally distinguished by having the cirri (long finger-like projections flanking the suckers) terminating at a much more distal sucker, but there are other differences in its V-shaped shell, and digestive system. It is only known from a female specimen, and the suckers of this specimen are much smaller than in S. gilchristi.

== Distribution ==
Stauroteuthis kengrahami is known from a single specimen collected off the coast at Batemans Bay, New South Wales, Australia, at a depth of 940–975 metres (3,080–3,200 ft).
