= Cirroteuthis kirrilyae =

Scientific classification
- Kingdom: Animalia
- Phylum: Mollusca
- Class: Cephalopoda
- Order: Octopoda
- Family: Cirroteuthidae
- Genus: Cirroteuthis
- Species: C. kirrilyae

Binomial name
- Cirroteuthis kirrilyae Verhoeff & O'Shea, 2025

Species of octopus

Cirroteuthis kirrilyae is a species of cirrate octopus in family Cirroteuthidae, previously confused with the closely related Cirroteuthis muelleri. The species was described by T.J. Verhoeff and Steve O'Shea.

The species is known from specimens collected around Australia, New Zealand, and New Caledonia, and is a pelagic or benthopelagic species known from a depth range of 1497-2581 m. The species may occur widely throughout the Pacific, with individuals possibly of this species observed by ROVs across the central and south-eastern Pacific. Specimens from off New Zealand were originally referred to as Cirroteuthis cf. muelleri, while material from the North-East Pacific (previously referred to C. muelleri) may also be this species, or represent further unknown taxa, given the apparent restriction of C. muelleri to the Arctic.

Higher sucker counts, as well as differences in pigmentation seem to distinguish C. kirrilyae from C. muelleri, in addition to clear molecular differences.
