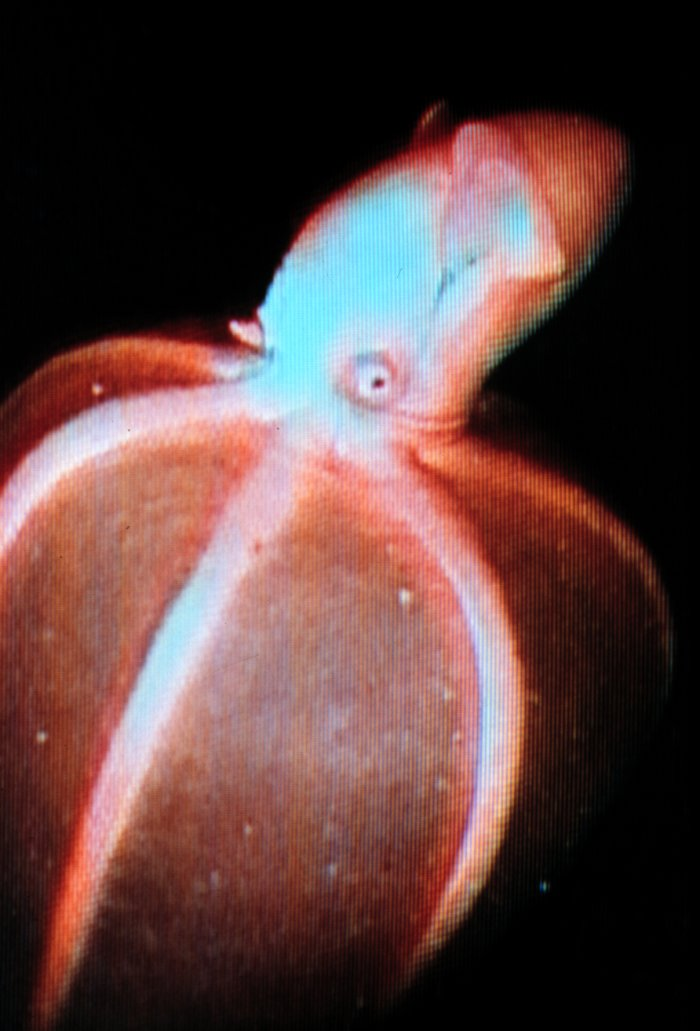
- cf. Stauroteuthis syrtensis

Conservation status
- Data Deficient (IUCN 3.1)

Scientific classification
- Kingdom: Animalia
- Phylum: Mollusca
- Class: Cephalopoda
- Order: Octopoda
- Family: Stauroteuthidae
- Genus: Stauroteuthis
- Species: S. syrtensis

Binomial name
- Stauroteuthis syrtensis Verrill, 1879

Synonyms
- Chunioteuthis ebersbachii Grimpe, 1916

= Stauroteuthis syrtensis =

Glowing sucker octopus

Species of octopus

Stauroteuthis syrtensis, also known as the glowing sucker octopus or bioluminescent octopus, is a species of small pelagic octopus found at great depths in the north Atlantic Ocean. It is one of a very small number of octopuses to exhibit bioluminescence.

== Taxonomy ==
The cirrate octopuses are deep sea species that have been relatively little studied. Some have been described on the basis of a single, poorly preserved specimen, and this makes deducing their phylogenetic relationships difficult. Some authorities adopt the traditional view that the genus Stauroteuthis is part of the family Stauroteuthidae that is characterized by the presence of a secondary web. The World Register of Marine Species, however, considers that it should be placed in the family Cirroteuthidae, basing this decision on ribosomal DNA and other evidence, and that Stauroteuthidae is a synonym of this family.

== Description ==
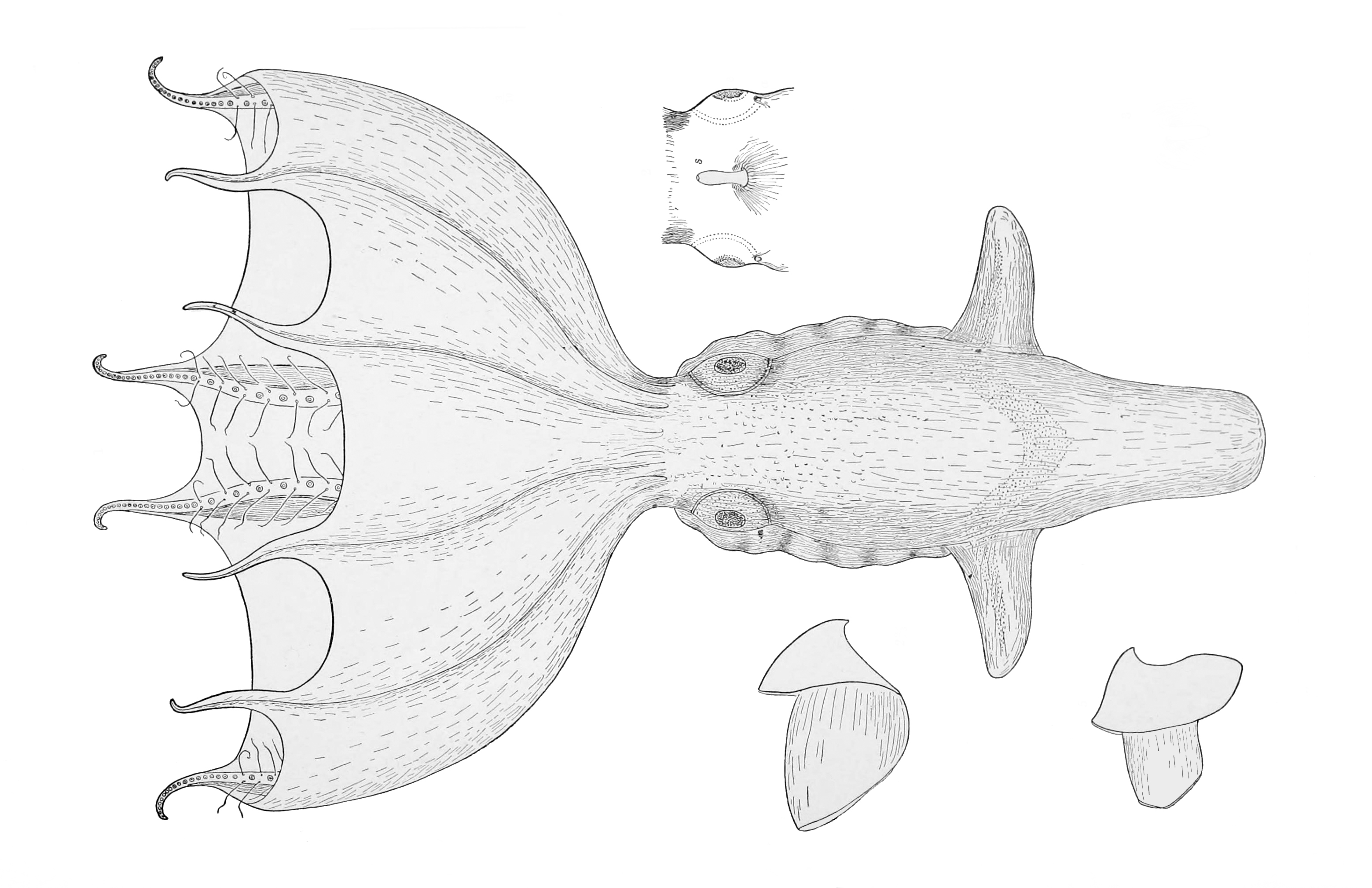
Anatomy of S. syrtensis. Insets depict the position of the siphon along with both halves of the beak; Addison Emery Verrill, 1882

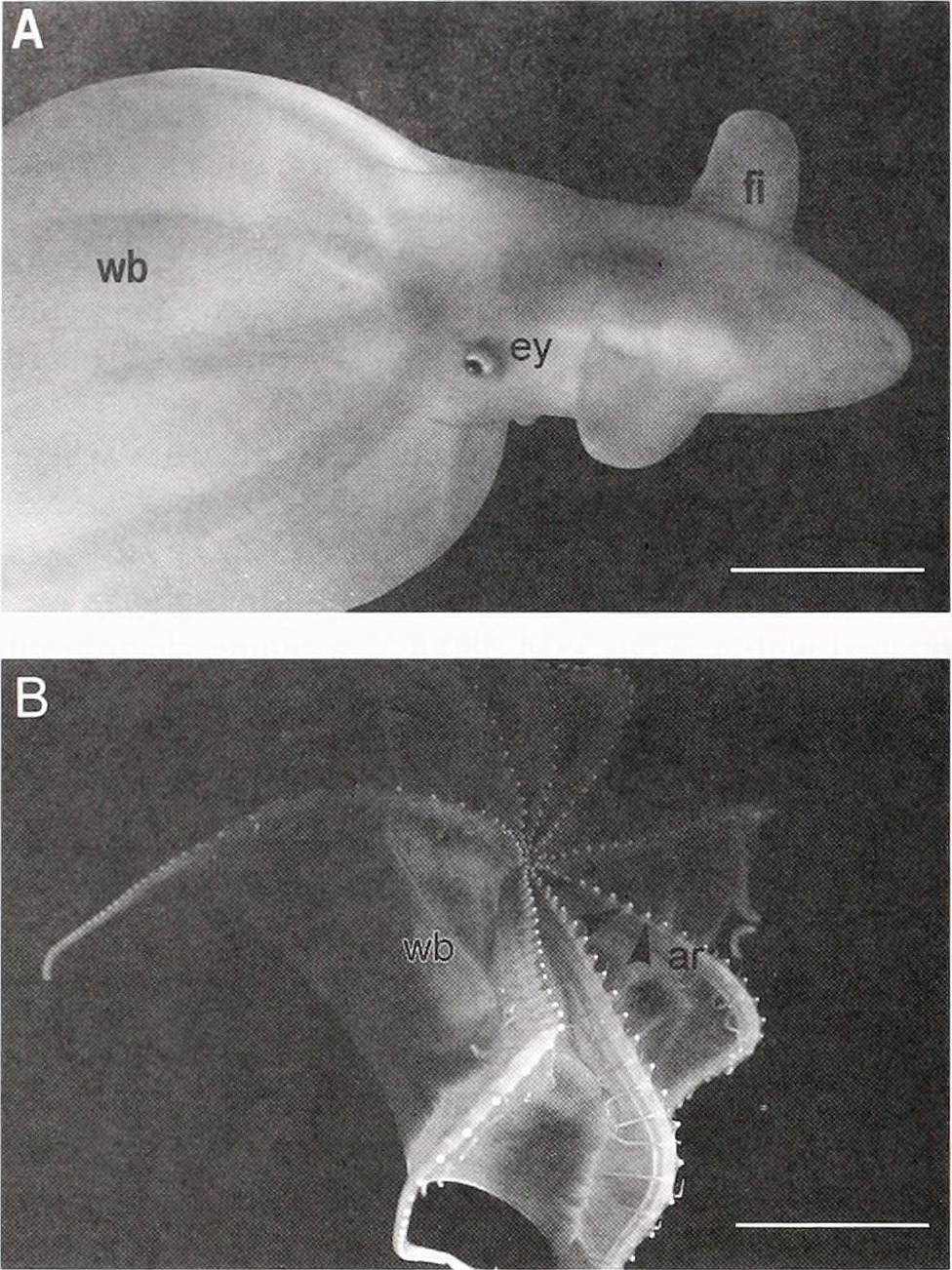

The mantle length of Stauroteuthis syrtensis is about 9 to 18 cm (4 to 7 in) and its width about 4 cm (1.6 in). Females typically display larger body sizes than the males, yet males exhibit wider and longer heads. The fins are some 4 to 6 cm (1.6 to 2.4 in) in width. The eight arms are of unequal length, the longest extending to about 35 cm (14 in). These are joined for two-thirds of their length by two webs, a dorsal complete membrane and a ventral partial one, giving the animal an umbrella-like shape. The number of adhesive suckers ranges from 55 to 65. These suckers vary in size and distance among males and females. However, suckers generally decrease in diameter and distance as they extend down the arm. Female suckers reach a maximum diameter of 6.5 mm at suckers 1 to 3 while male suckers, on the other hand, are relatively larger. Between suckers 8 to 25 there are conspicuous cirri. These are elongate, fleshy tendrils borne on the sides of the oral surface of the arms, the longest being at sucker 20 which can be up to 50 mm in length. The oral cavity and mouth area are pink or purple in color that extends towards the arms and lightens as it reaches the tips. The general texture is gelatinous and the animal is reddish-brown and translucent, with the internal organs being visible through the skin. A vestigial, U-shaped, internal shell supports the fins, the only other hard part of the animal being the two-part beak.

== Behavior ==
The diet of Stauroteuthis syrtensis consists mostly of crustaceans, with the majority belonging to groups such as calanoida, mysidacia, and occasionally isopoda. Although observations of hunting and feeding behavior seem to be absent from the literature, Stauroteuthis syrtensis has been reported to float passively with arms contracted, webs curled into a ball, and eyes hooded, until disturbed by research submersibles.

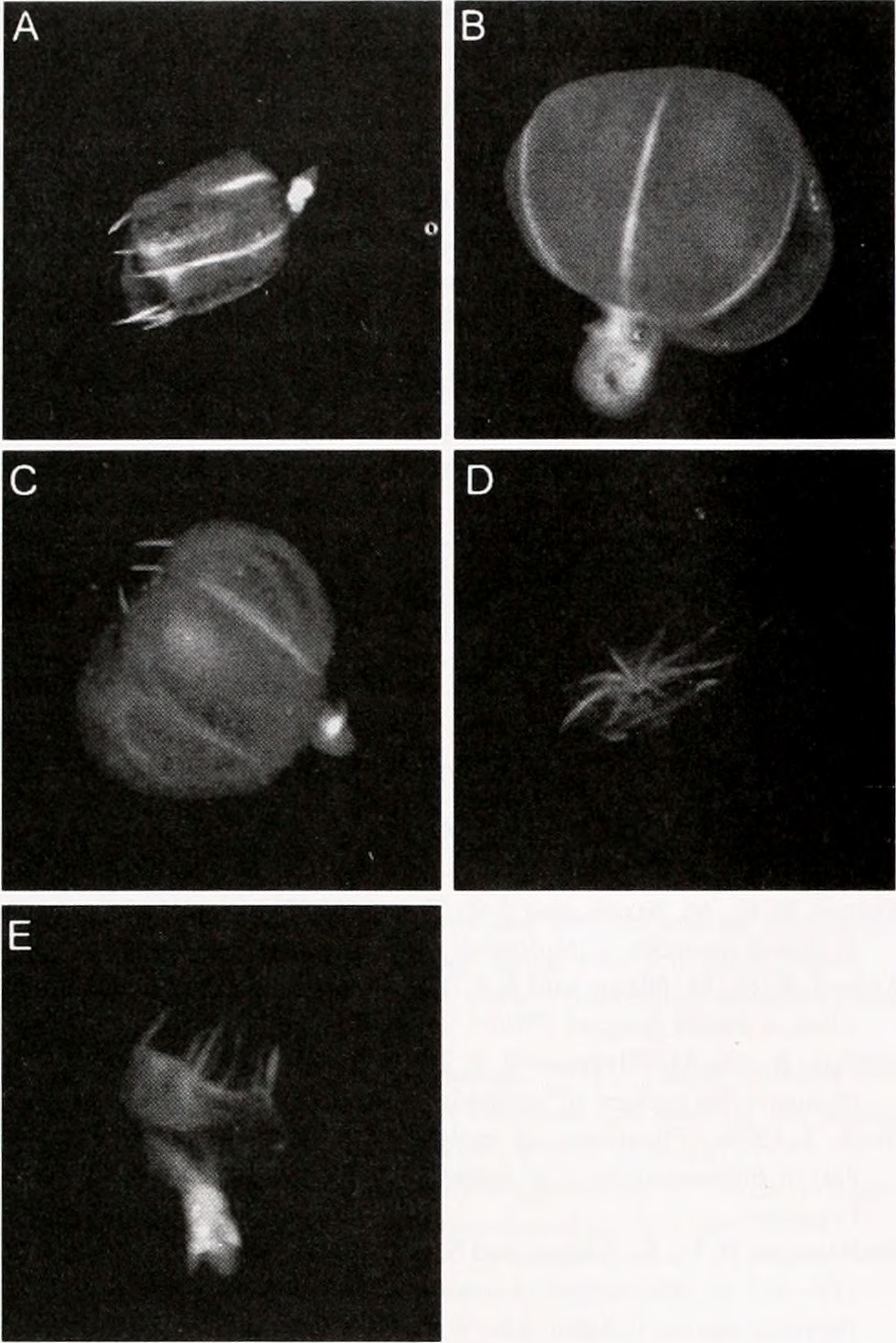
Frames an of in situ video of Stauroteuthis syrtensis: (A) bell posture; (B) distended balloon posture; (C) pumpkin posture (distinguished from the balloon posture by the fact the web is not fully inflated); (D) inverted umbrella posture; (E) animal twisting and opening its arms after ballooning.

== Distribution ==
Stauroteuthis syrtensis is found in the North Atlantic at an extreme depth range of 500 to 4,000 m (1,600 to 13,100 ft). It is most frequently found a few hundred metres from the bottom of the ocean at depths between 1,500 and 2,500 m (4,900 and 8,200 ft). It seems to be fairly common off the edge of the continental shelf on the eastern coast of the United States, and has also been observed at similar depths off the British Isles. The species is strongly restricted from crossing into the Arctic ocean, even where similar habitat (deep ocean ridges) exist. The strongest restriction factor to their northern range is assumed to be related to temperature.

== Bioluminescence ==
Stauroteuthis is one of only two genera of octopuses to exhibit bioluminescence. S. syrtensis emits a blue-green light from about 40 modified suckers known as photophores situated in a single row between the pairs of cirri on the underside of each arm. The distance between these decreases towards the ends of the arms with the light becoming fainter. The animal does not emit light continuously, but can do so for a period of five minutes after suitable stimulation. Some of the photophores emit a continuous stream of faint light, while others are much brighter and switch on and off in a cyclical pattern, producing a twinkling effect. The function of the bioluminescence is believed to be for defense, being used by the animal to scare off predators, and also as a lure for the planktonic crustaceans that form its main diet. While some species, such as the Lampyris noctiluca use their light to attract a mate, the light may also be used for sexual signaling as well, but this is considered to be an unlikely function, as the light is deployed by both sexes and by immature, as well as mature, individuals.

== Biomimicry ==
S. syrtensis is noted for inspiring self-adaptive, soft robotic grippers used for underwater handling of various objects. The gripper closely mimics the sucker and web structure of S. sytenesis, which is adapted for preying upon crustaceans of differing size and shape. The resulting robotic gripper is therefore superior for grasping round, concave, flat, or irregularly shaped objects when visibility is low or conditions are turbid.

Another innovation inspired by the glowing sucker octopus are self-healing, photoswitchable and reversible fluorescent eutectogels. These are stimulus responsive (typically by UV radiation) materials with tunable fluorescence that can be used to write unique patterns. Their self-healing properties, and resistance to stresses such as stretching make them a promising material for use in anti-counterfeiting, and information encryption measures.
