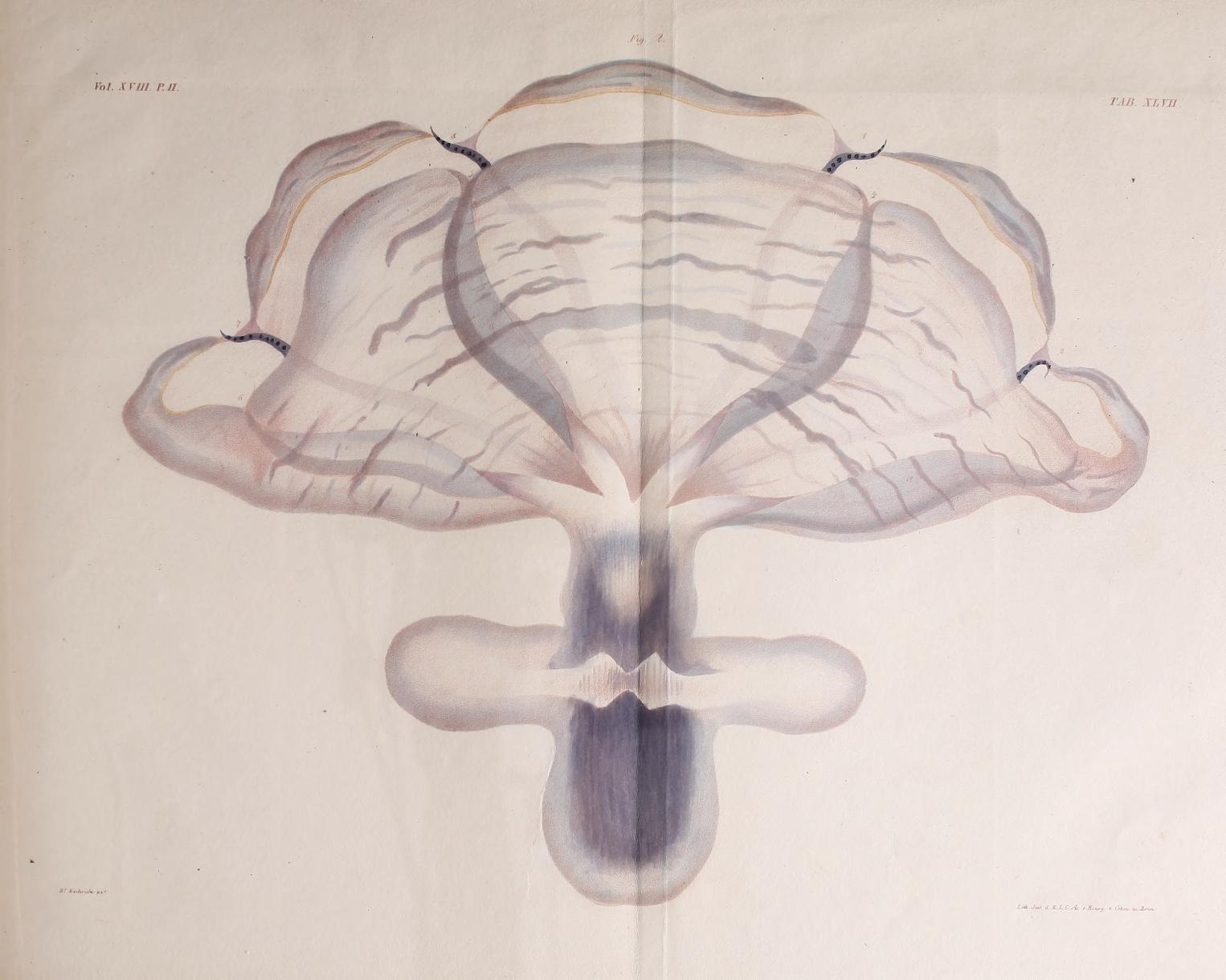
- Illustration of Cirroteuthis muelleri in its 1838 description by Eschricht

Conservation status
- Least Concern (IUCN 3.1)

Scientific classification
- Kingdom: Animalia
- Phylum: Mollusca
- Class: Cephalopoda
- Order: Octopoda
- Family: Cirroteuthidae
- Genus: Cirroteuthis
- Species: C. muelleri

Binomial name
- Cirroteuthis muelleri Eschricht, 1838

= Cirroteuthis muelleri =

Species of mollusc

Cirroteuthis muelleri is a species of cirrate octopus restricted to the Arctic Ocean and far North Atlantic. The species has the distinction of being the first cirrate octopus species to be described.

The species was previously believed to occur in other ocean basins (North Pacific and southern hemisphere), but these are likely attributable to other species such as the recently described Cirroteuthis kirrilyae.
