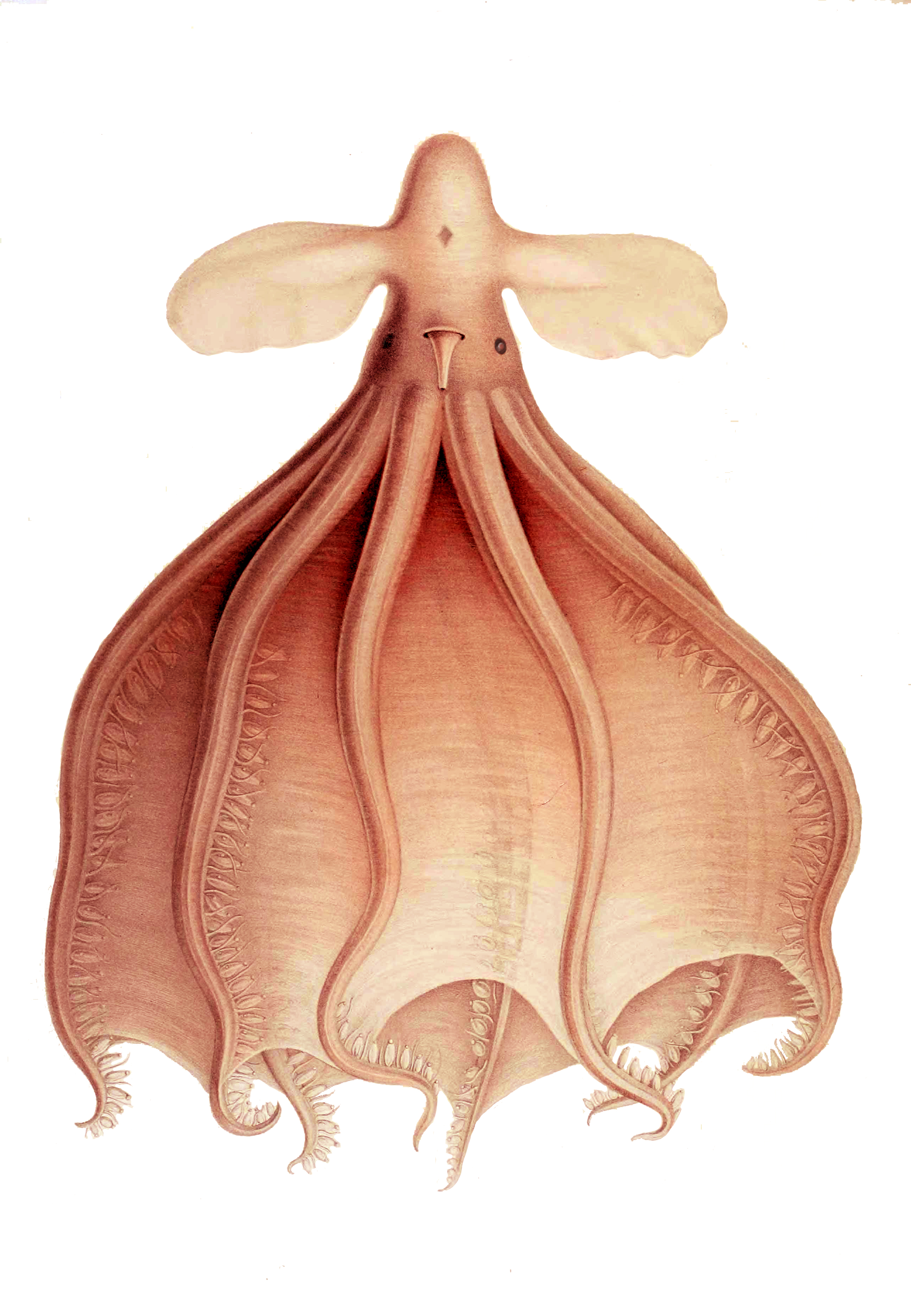
- Cirrothauma murrayi

Scientific classification
- Kingdom: Animalia
- Phylum: Mollusca
- Class: Cephalopoda
- Order: Octopoda
- Suborder: Cirrina
- Family: Cirroteuthidae; Keferstein, 1866

Genera
- Cirroteuthis; Cirrothauma; Inopinoteuthis

= Cirroteuthidae =

Family of octopuses

Cirroteuthidae is a family of pelagic cirrate octopuses comprising at least five species in three genera.

== Description ==
The cirrate octopods have a unique internal shell, positioned dorsally above the viscera and with a 'saddle-like' shape in Cirroteuthis (or 'butterfly-like' in Cirrothauma and Inopinoteuthis due to the anterior corners being more drawn out). The lateral faces of the 'saddle' acting as large attachment sites for fin muscles, supporting proportionally large and powerful fins. The arms are elongate and have both a primary web, forming most of the webbing, and a secondary web connecting the primary webbing to the aboral (outer) faces of each arm. The cirri, pairs of small finger-like projections between each sucker, are very elongate. Both the elongate cirri and secondary web are features shared with Stauroteuthidae, but no other cirrate family.

== Taxonomy ==
The family Cirroteuthidae contains three accepted genera containing at least five species, but also some possibly undescribed taxa.

- Genus Cirroteuthis Eschricht, 1838.
  - Cirroteuthis muelleri Eschricht, 1838
  - Cirroteuthis kirrilyae Verhoeff & O'Shea, 2025
- Genus Cirrothauma Chun, 1911
  - Cirrothauma murrayi Chun, 1911: often known as the blind cirrate.
- Genus Inopinoteuthis Verhoeff & O'Shea, 2025
  - Inopinoteuthis magna (Hoyle, 1885): originally described in genus Cirroteuthis.
  - Inopinoteuthis hoylei (Robson, 1932): originally described in genus Cirroteuthis.

There are also two genera of uncertain affinity placed in this family, but both are in need of critical assessment.

- Laetmoteuthis Berry, 1913
- Froekenia Hoyle, 1904: One described species (Froekenia clara) and an undescribed species, quite likely synonymous with Stauroteuthis given shell form.
