= Stauroteuthis gilchristi =

Conservation status
- Data Deficient (IUCN 3.1)

Scientific classification
- Kingdom: Animalia
- Phylum: Mollusca
- Class: Cephalopoda
- Order: Octopoda
- Family: Stauroteuthidae
- Genus: Stauroteuthis
- Species: S. gilchristi

Binomial name
- Stauroteuthis gilchristi (Robson, 1924)

Synonyms
- Chunioteuthis gilchristi (Robson, 1924); Cirroteuthis gilchristi Robson, 1924

Species of octopus

Stauroteuthis gilchristi is a species of small pelagic octopus found at great depths in the south Atlantic Ocean. It is believed to be one of a very small number of octopuses to exhibit bioluminescence, like its sister taxon Stauroteuthis syrtensis.

== Description ==
Stauroteuthis gilchristi has a secondary web, a small mantle aperture and a vestigial, U-shaped shell supporting the fins. The arms are fringed with long cirri but these do not extend as far as the tip. There is no radula. It can be distinguished from the otherwise similar Stauroteuthis syrtensis by the larger suckers. Only a few specimens have been examined, and from these it seems that there is no sexual dimorphism. However, this may not be the case, as most specimens so far collected have been either males or immature females.

== Distribution ==
Stauroteuthis gilchristi is found in deep waters in the southern Atlantic Ocean. The type specimen was taken from near South Africa and is the only specimen recovered from that locality. A small number of individuals have since been recovered from near South Georgia. There is a certain difference between these and the holotype in that the cirri start further up the arm in the South Georgia specimens, and it is possible that there are in fact two different species, one on each side of the Atlantic. More recently, evidence has been found of the presence of this species in the southern Indian Ocean, and off Macquarie Island (south of Australia), and it may therefore have a circum-polar distribution throughout the Southern Ocean.

== Ecology ==
In a study, the stomach contents of a top predator in sub-antarctic waters, the Patagonian toothfish (Dissostichus eleginoides), were examined in order to see what octopuses and squid formed part of the diet. These could be identified by the undigested remains of their beaks. In waters around the Crozet Islands, 53 beaks of S. gilchristi were found among a total of 1725 cephalopod beaks, and this cirrate octopus formed 3% of the diet of the toothfish. This study extended the range of S. gilchristi into the southern Indian Ocean.
