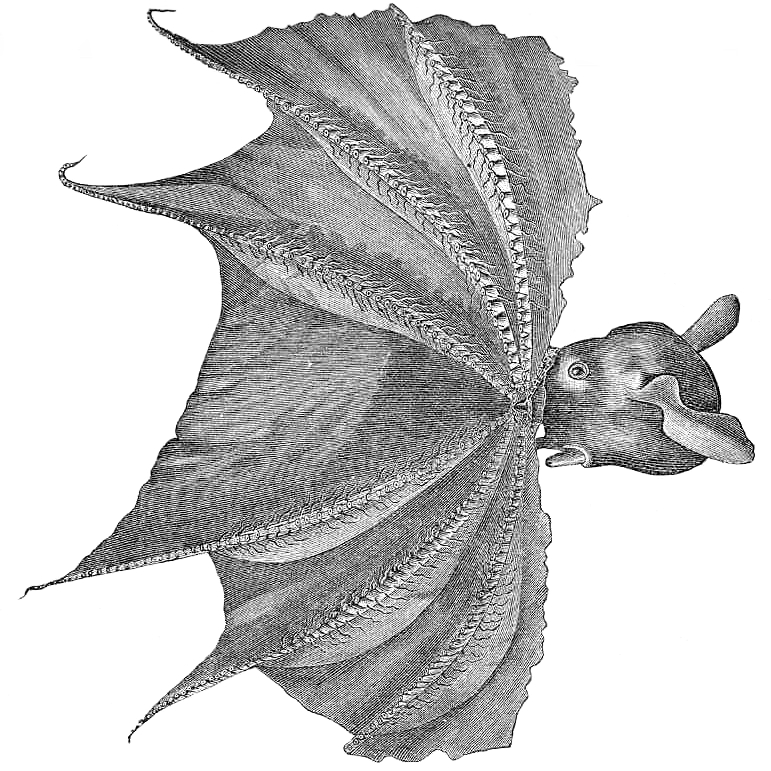

Conservation status
- Data Deficient (IUCN 3.1)

Scientific classification
- Kingdom: Animalia
- Phylum: Mollusca
- Class: Cephalopoda
- Order: Octopoda
- Family: Cirroteuthidae
- Genus: Inopinoteuthis
- Species: I. magna

Binomial name
- Inopinoteuthis magna (Hoyle, 1885)

Synonyms
- Cirroteuthis magna Hoyle, 1885; Cirrothauma magna (Hoyle, 1885)

= Inopinoteuthis magna =

Species of octopus

Inopinoteuthis magna, also known as the big-eye jellyhead, is a species of deep-sea cirrate octopus that has been found in the Indian, Atlantic, and Pacific oceans. It is known from four damaged specimens. The species was originally described in genus Cirroteuthis, and was later allocated to Cirrothauma since its shell and elongate arms are similar to those of Cirrothauma murrayi. More recently the species (along with I. hoylei) has been allocated to a separate genus (Inopinoteuthis) given that these species differ rather strongly from Cirrothauma in having functional eyes (vs. vestigial eyes in C. murrayi) and differ greatly in sucker form.

Inopinoteuthis magna is likely the largest species of cirrate octopus, one female specimen measuring 1.7 m total length. The animal has delicate, jelly-like flesh.
