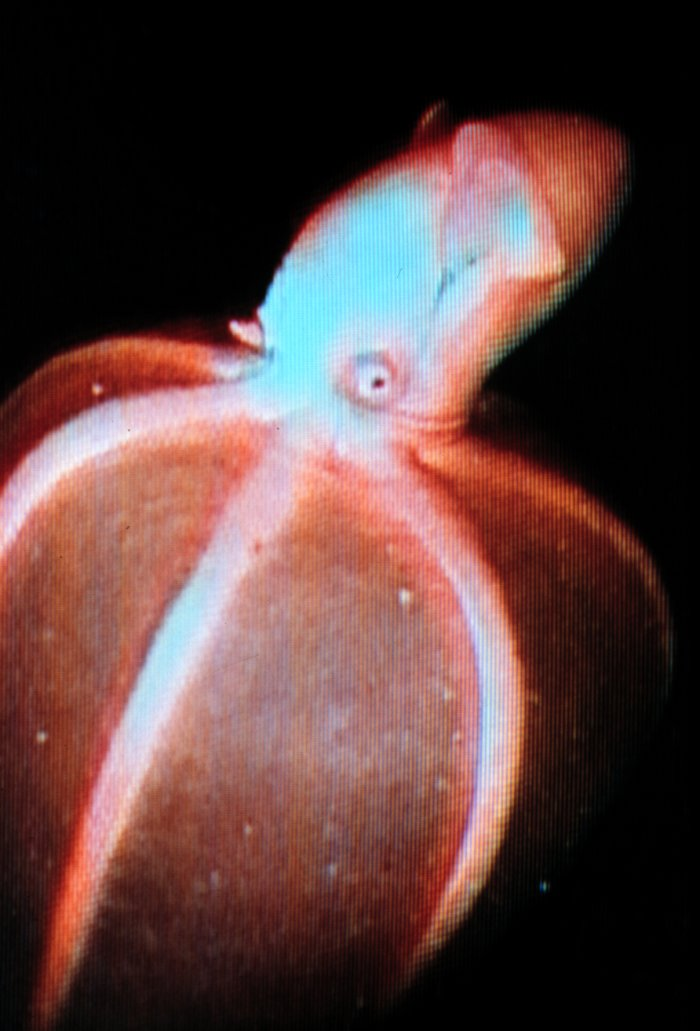
- Stauroteuthis syrtensis

Scientific classification
- Kingdom: Animalia
- Phylum: Mollusca
- Class: Cephalopoda
- Order: Octopoda
- Family: Stauroteuthidae; Grimpe, 1916
- Genus: Stauroteuthis; Verrill, 1879

Species
- S. gilchristi (Robson, 1924); S. syrtensis Verrill, 1879 (type)

Synonyms
- Chunioteuthis Grimpe, 1916

= Stauroteuthis =

Genus of octopuses

Stauroteuthis is a genus of deepwater cirrate octopus, a cephalopod mollusk. This is the only genus in the family Stauroteuthidae, and only three species have been described in this genus.

The organisms live below 700 m (2,300 ft) water depth; although sometimes found as deep as 4 km (2.5 mi) underwater, they generally live at a water depth of around 2 km (1.2 mi). They do not possess a radula.

The stauroteuthids have the distinction of being one of the few bioluminescent octopuses; some of the muscle cells that control the suckers in most species have been replaced with photophores which are believed to fool prey by directing them towards the mouth.

== Species ==
- Stauroteuthis gilchristi (Robson, 1924): Known from two localities in the south Atlantic, and other southern ocean locations (Macquarie Island, and Kerguelen).
- Stauroteuthis syrtensis Verrill, 1879: Widespread in the North Atlantic. The population size of S. syrtensis is unknown.
- Stauroteuthis kengrahami Verhoeff, 2023: Known from a single specimen off eastern Australia.
