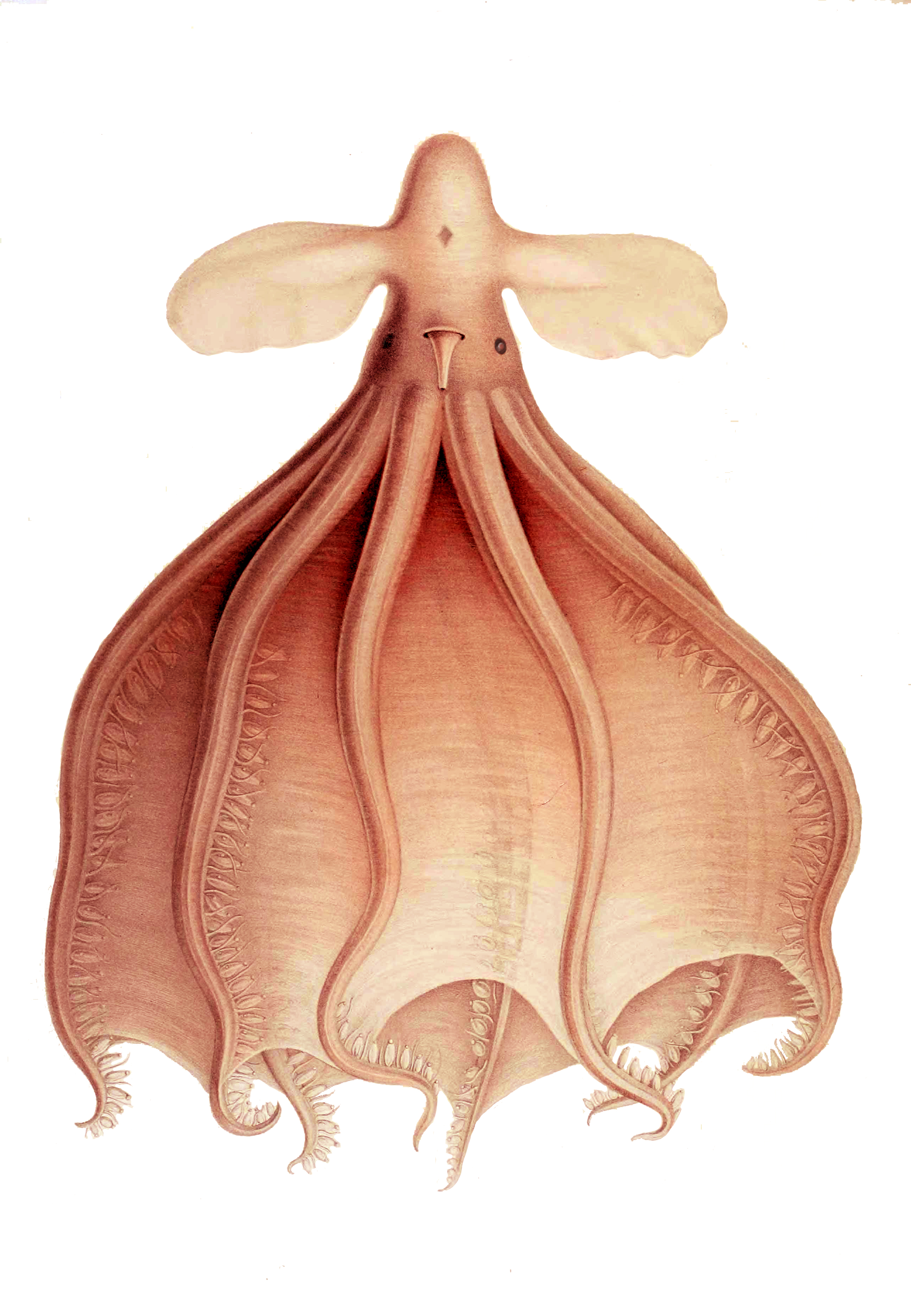

Conservation status
- Data Deficient (IUCN 3.1)

Scientific classification
- Kingdom: Animalia
- Phylum: Mollusca
- Class: Cephalopoda
- Order: Octopoda
- Family: Cirroteuthidae
- Genus: Cirrothauma
- Species: C. murrayi

Binomial name
- Cirrothauma murrayi Chun, 1911

= Cirrothauma murrayi =

Species of octopus

Cirrothauma murrayi, the blind cirrate octopus, is a presumably blind octopus whose eyes can likely sense light, but not form images. It has been found worldwide, usually 1,500 to 4,500 metres (4,900 to 14,800 ft) beneath the ocean's surface, but a single specimen was collected in the Arctic immediately below the sea ice. Like other cirrates, it has an internal shell, muscular fins for swimming, and a web connecting the arms.

The species was first caught by an expedition led by Sir John Murray in 1910, and it was later named in honor of Murray. It was described by German marine biologist Carl Chun in 1911.

Molecular work suggests that Cirrothauma murrayi may comprise two similar species, indeed work on the species by Aldred et al. (1983) found that some specimens had sucker counts in the upper 30's per arm while others had counts around 60 per arm (despite the animals being similar in size), which may suggest two otherwise similar species.

== Description ==
Like other members of Cirroteuthidae, the species has cirri on its tentacles and deep webbing between the arms, a pair of fins, and no radula.

=== Eye structure ===
The eye structure is very different from other cephalopods. Their eyes are small, lens-less and presumably non-functional, as the eyes also lack irises and ciliary bodies. The eyes are embedded deep in the gelatinous tissue of their head. The optic nerves are long and connect to a "minute" optic lobe.

=== Suckers ===
Cirrothauma murrayi has approximately 30 to 60 suckers per arm. The proximal 6 on each arm are sessile (without a stalk), but the remaining suckers out to the arm tips are highly modified, being minute and lacking suction chambers, and are mounted atop elongate fleshy/gelatinous stalks.

== Diet ==
The diet of this species is unknown, but like other cirrate octopods, the buccal mass, esophagus, and stomach of Cirrothauma murrayi suggest whole (but very small) organisms, especially small crustaceans, are part of its diet (it has only a vestigial trace of a radula). The enzymatic action of salivary excretions separates the crustacean's musculoskeletal attachments and allows for the tissue to be removed, leaving the exoskeleton of the crustacean undamaged.

== Bibliography ==
- Aldred, R. G.; Nixon, M.; Young, J. Z. (26 April 1983). "Cirrothauma Murrayi Chun, A Finned Octopod". Philosophical Transactions of the Royal Society of London. Series B, Biological Sciences. 301 (1103): 1–54. Bibcode:1983RSPTB.301....1A. doi:10.1098/rstb.1983.0021. JSTOR 2396064.
