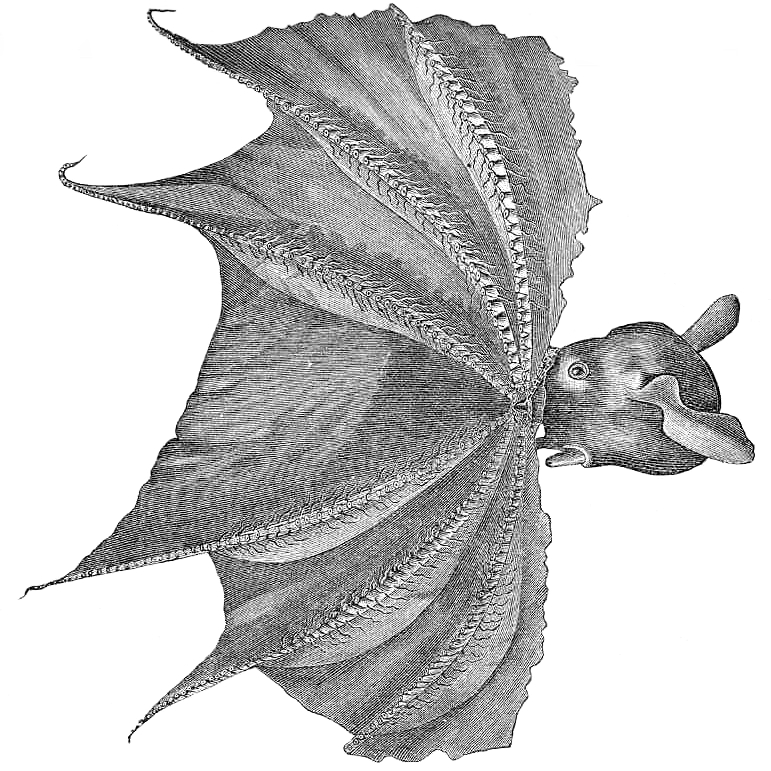
- Inopinoteuthis magna

Scientific classification
- Kingdom: Animalia
- Phylum: Mollusca
- Class: Cephalopoda
- Order: Octopoda
- Family: Cirroteuthidae
- Genus: Inopinoteuthis; Verhoeff & O'Shea, 2025

Type species
- Inopinoteuthis magna (Hoyle, 1885)

= Inopinoteuthis =

Genus of octopuses

Inopinoteuthis is a genus of deepsea octopuses from the cirrate family Cirroteuthidae. The two recognized species are fragile, gelatinous deep-sea octopods with a large 'butterfly-shaped' shell.

One of the two species, I. magna, attains the greatest size of any cirrate octopus at 1.7 m long.

== Species and taxonomy ==
The two species have formerly been included in Cirrothauma. Both Cirrothauma and Inopinoteuthis have butterfly-shaped shells, and much longer arms than the related Cirroteuthis (the two genera also lack the web nodules found on Cirroteuthis, and have fewer gill lamellae).

Genera Cirrothauma and Inopinoteuthis can be separated given the presence of well-developed eyes on Inopinoteuthis (vs. vestigial eyes on Cirrothauma) as well as the presence of functional suckers with suction chambers on Inopinoteuthis (Cirrothauma have minute vestigial suckers atop elongate fleshy stalks across the mid-distal arm regions).

== Species ==
There are two recognized species within the genus Inopinoteuthis.

- Inopinoteuthis magna (Hoyle, 1885): originally described in genus Cirroteuthis.
- Inopinoteuthis hoylei (Robson, 1932): originally described in genus Cirroteuthis.
