= Daniel Frederik Eschricht =

Danish physician and zoologist (1798–1863)

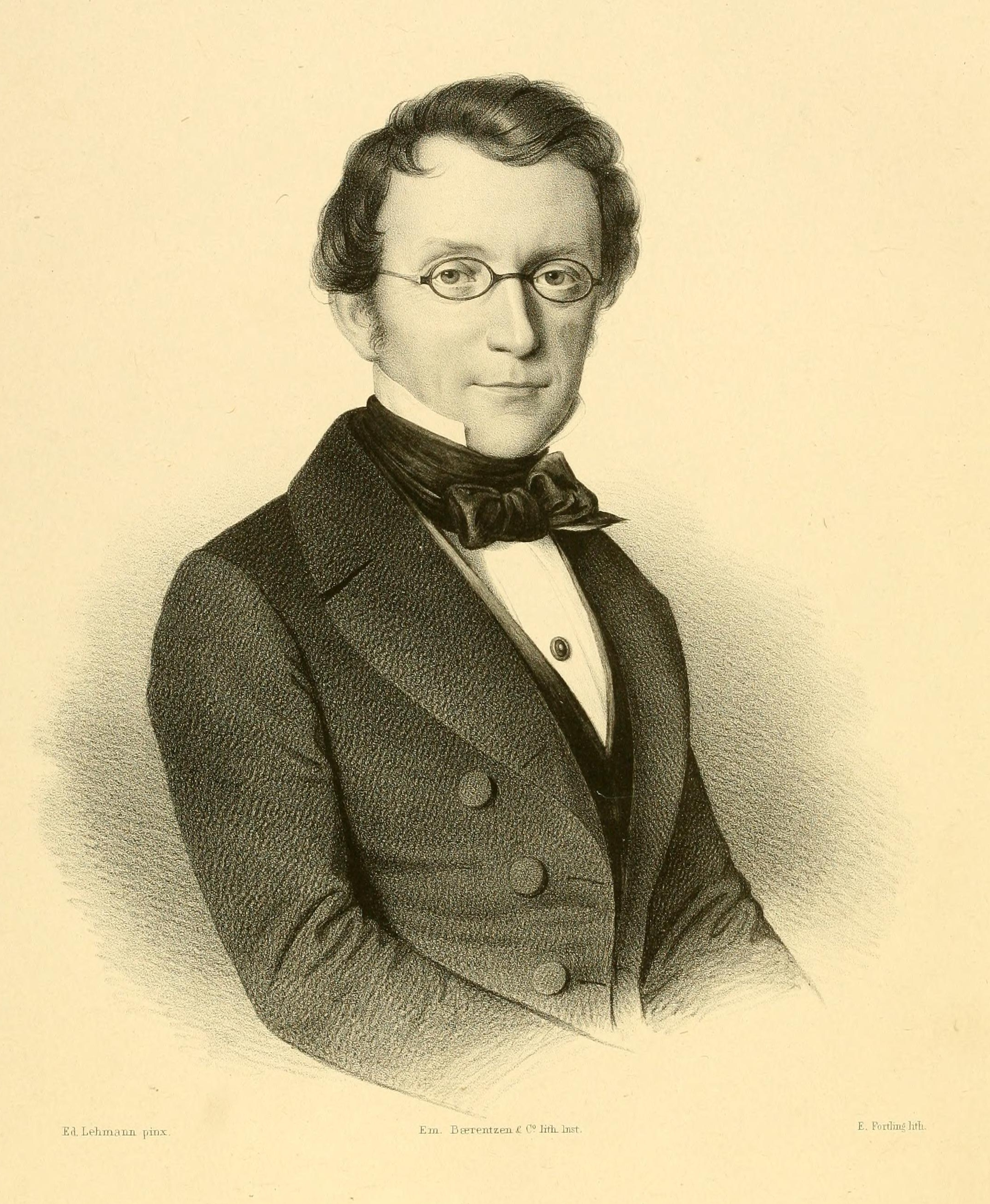
- Born: 18 March 1798; Copenhagen, Denmark
- Died: 22 February 1863 (aged 64)
- Scientific career
- Fields: Zoology
- Author abbrev. (zoology): Eschricht

Daniel Frederik Eschricht (18 March 1798 – 22 February 1863) was a Danish zoologist, physiologist, and anatomist known as an authority on whales. He was born in Copenhagen, and studied medicine at Frederiks Hospital, graduating in 1822. He was a student of François Magendie in Paris from 1824-1825, composing a thesis on cranial nerves, after which he studied with prominent European naturalists and anatomists, including Georges Cuvier. He joined the University of Copenhagen in 1829, becoming Professor of Anatomy and Physiology in 1836. The gray whale genus Eschrichtius was named for him a year after his death. In 1861, Eschricht dissected an orca and found thirteen common porpoises and fourteen seals inside. Jules Verne referred to the incident in the Sargasso chapter of his 1870 novel Twenty Thousand Leagues Under the Seas.

He was elected as a member of the American Philosophical Society in 1863.
