= List of data deficient molluscs =

- Extinct in the wild (EW): 13 species
- Critically endangered (CR): 581 species
- Endangered (EN): 507 species
- Vulnerable (VU): 879 species
- Near threatened (NT, LR/cd): 535 species
- Least concern (LC): 2,437 species
- Data deficient (DD): 1,988 species
Mollusc species (IUCN, 2020.1)
- 6941 extant species have been evaluated
- 4953 of those are fully assessed (Note: excludes data deficient evaluations.)
- 2972 are not threatened at present
- 1967 to 3955 are threatened (Note: Threatened comprises CR, EN and VU. Upper estimate additionally includes DD.)
- 324 to 441 are extinct or extinct in the wild:
  - 311 extinct (EX) species (Note: Chart omits extinct (EX) species)
  - 13 extinct in the wild (EW)
  - 117 possibly extinct [CR(PE)]
  - 0 possibly extinct in the wild [CR(PEW)]

In September 2016, the International Union for Conservation of Nature (IUCN) listed 1988 data deficient mollusc species. Of all evaluated mollusc species, 27% are listed as data deficient. The IUCN also lists 40 mollusc subspecies as data deficient.

No subpopulations of molluscs have been evaluated by the IUCN.

This is a complete list of data deficient mollusc species and subspecies evaluated by the IUCN.

== Gastropods ==
There are 1526 species and 37 subspecies of gastropod evaluated as data deficient.

=== Vetigastropoda ===
- Teinostoma fernandesi
- Teinostoma funiculatum

=== Stylommatophora ===
Stylommatophora includes the majority of land snails and slugs. There are 392 species and 32 subspecies in the order Stylommatophora evaluated as data deficient.

==== Partulids ====
- Partula carteriensis
- Partula coxi
- Partula cramptoni
- Partula dorseyi
- Partula similaris
- Samoana annectens
- Samoana ganymedes
- Samoana magdalinae

==== Subulinids ====
Species

- Hypolysia connollyana
- Hypolysia usambarica
- Pseudoglessula acutissima
- Pseudoglessula conradti
- Pyrgina umbilicata
- Subulina usambarica
- Thomea newtoni

Subspecies

- Opeas nothapalinus crenatum
- Pseudoglessula leroyi fasciata

==== Achatinellids ====
- Auriculella ambusta
- Auriculella castanea
- Auriculella crassula
- Auriculella malleata
- Auriculella perpusilla
- Auriculella pulchra
- Auriculella tenella
- Elasmias jaurffreti
- Elasmias quadrasi
- Lamellidea microstoma
- Lamellidea subcylindrica
- Partulina dolei
- Partulina dwightii
- Partulina fusoidea
- Partulina kaaeana
- Partulina nattii
- Partulina porcellana
- Partulina talpina
- Partulina terebra
- Partulina ustulata
- Partulina virgulata
- Perdicella carinella
- Perdicella kuhnsi
- Perdicella ornata
- Tornatellinops ponapensis

==== Endodontids ====
- Painted snake-coiled forest snail (Anguispira picta)
- Hirasea biconcava
- Hirasea eutheca
- Hirasea goniobasis
- Hirasea hypolia
- Hirasea major
- Hirasea mirabilis
- Hirasea nesiotica
- Hirasea profundispira
- Hirasea sinuosa
- Hirasiella clara

==== Charopids ====
- Bischoffena bischoffensis
- Coenocharopa yessabahensis
- Cralopa kaputarensis
- Dipnelix pertricosa
- Himeroconcha fusca
- Himeroconcha lamlanensis
- Himeroconcha quadrasi
- Himeroconcha rotula
- Jokajdon callizonus
- Jokajdon tumidulus
- Kubaryiellus kubaryi
- Ladronellum mariannarum
- Letomola contortus
- Ngairea murphyi
- Oreokera cumulus
- Oreokera nimbus
- Oreomava cannfluviatilus
- Palikirus cosmetus
- Palikirus ponapicus
- Palline micramyla
- Radiodiscus coppingers
- Radiodiscus iheringi
- Rhophodon kempseyensis
- Rhophodon problematica
- Roimontis tolotomensis
- Russatus nigrescens
- Semperdon rotanus
- Sinployea kusaieana
- Trochogyra leptotera
- Trukcharopa trukana

==== Helicarionids ====
- Atrichotoxon usambarense
- Elisolimax rufescens
- Harmogenanina detecta
- Leptichnus bernardi
- Ryssota pachystoma
- Sitala mazumbaiensis
- Trichotoxon martensi
- Trochozonites usambarensis

==== Orthalicids ====
- Bulimulus albermalensis
- Bulimulus elaeodes
- Bulimulus hemaerodes
- Bulimulus nucula
- Bulimulus pallidus
- Bulimulus rugatinus
- Bulimulus rugiferus
- Bulimulus simrothi
- Bulimulus trogonius
- Placostylus garretti
- Placostylus subroseus

==== Euconulids ====
- Dendrotrochus ponapensis
- Kusaiea frivola
- Lamprocystis denticulata
- Lamprocystis fastigata
- Lamprocystis hornbosteli
- Lamprocystis misella
- Liardetia tenuisculpta
- Palaua babelthuapi
- Palaua margaritacea
- Palaua ngarduaisi
- Palaua straminea
- Palaua wilsoni
- Tengchiena euroxestus

==== Rhytidids ====
- Delos oualanensis
- Ouagapia spaldingi
- Gillies' land snail (Paryphanta gilliesi)
- Hochstetter's land snail (Paryphanta hochstetteri)
- Woodformed land snail (Paryphanta lignaria)
- Ross' land snail (Paryphanta rossiana)
- Travers' land snail (Paryphanta traversi)

==== Streptaxids ====
Species

- Edentulina usambarensis
- Gonaxis usambarensis
- Gonaxis vosseleri
- Gulella alleni
- Gulella amaniensis
- Gulella bomolensis
- Gulella cuspidata
- Gulella foliifera
- Gulella greenwayi
- Gulella grossa
- Gulella inconspicua
- Gulella intrusa
- Gulella ludwigi
- Gulella ndamanyiluensis
- Gulella paucidens
- Gulella translucida
- Gulella unidentata
- Gulella usambarica
- Ptychotrema mazumbiensis
- Ptychotrema usambarense
- Tayloria amaniensis
- Tayloria angustistriata
- Tayloria hyalinoides

Subspecies

- Gulella conradti reductidentata
- Gulella gouldi globulosa
- Gulella gwendolinae mkusiensis
- Gulella lornae lornae
- Gulella lornae major
- Gulella subhyalina addita
- Gulella usagarica msambaa
- Gulella usagarica satura

==== Zonitids ====
- Brazieria entomostoma
- Brazieria erasa
- Brazieria lutaria
- Brazieria minuscula
- Brazieria obesa
- Brazieria velata
- Glyphyalinia pecki
- Hogolua kondorum (Hongolua kondorum)
- Kondoa kondorum
- Trochomorpha approximata
- Trochomorpha carolinae
- Trochomorpha conoides
- Trochomorpha contigua
- Trochomorpha depressostriata
- Trochomorpha kantavuensis
- Trochomorpha kuesteri
- Trochomorpha latimarginata
- Trochomorpha merzianoides
- Trochomorpha nigritella
- Trochomorpha tumulus

==== Pupillids ====
- Lyropupa anceyana
- Lyropupa clathratula
- Lyropupa hawaiiensis
- Lyropupa lyrata
- Lyropupa microthauma
- Lyropupa mirabilis
- Lyropupa prisca
- Lyropupa rhabdota
- Lyropupa scabra
- Lyropupa spaldingi
- Lyropupa sparna
- Lyropupa striatula
- Lyropupa thaanumi
- Lyropupa truncata
- Nesopupa alloia
- Nesopupa anceyana
- Nesopupa bacca
- Nesopupa baldwini
- Nesopupa bishopi
- Nesopupa dispersa
- Nesopupa dubitabilis
- Nesopupa eapensis
- Nesopupa forbesi
- Nesopupa infrequens
- Nesopupa kauaiensis
- Nesopupa limatula
- Nesopupa litoralis
- Nesopupa newcombi
- Nesopupa oahuensis
- Nesopupa plicifera
- Nesopupa ponapica
- Nesopupa quadrasi
- Nesopupa rodriguezensis
- Nesopupa singularis
- Nesopupa subcentralis
- Nesopupa thaanumi
- Nesopupa waianensis
- Nesopupa wesleyana
- Pronesopupa acanthinula
- Pronesopupa boettgeri
- Pronesopupa frondicella
- Pronesopupa hystricella
- Pronesopupa incerta
- Pronesopupa lymaniana
- Pronesopupa molokaiensis
- Pronesopupa orycta
- Pronesopupa sericata
- Pupilla bigranata
- Pupoidopsis hawaiensis

==== Polygyrids ====
Species

- Archer's toothed land snail (Mesodon archeri)
- Jones' middle-toothed land snail (Mesodon jonesianus)
- Virginia fringed mountain snail (Polygyriscus virginianus)
- Stenotrema hubrichti
- Pilsbry's narrow-apertured land snail (Stenotrema pilsbryi)
- Western three-toothed land snail (Triodopsis occidentalis)
- Flat-spired three-toothed snail (Triodopsis platysayoides)
- Karok hesperion (Vespericola karokorum)

Subspecies

- Noonday snail (Mesodon clarki nantahala)
- Banded mesodon (Mesodon clausus trossulus)
- Stenotrema leai cheatumi

==== Helminthoglyptids ====
Species

- Shasta sideband (Monadenia troglodytes)

Subspecies

- Cathedral desert snail (Eremarionta indioensis cathedralis)
- Baker desert snail (Eremarionta rowelli bakerensis)
- Mccoy desert snail (Eremarionta rowelli mccoiana)
- Helminthoglypta arrosa pomoensis
- Cape shoulderband (Helminthoglypta expansilabris mattolensis)
- Nicklin's peninsula snail (Helminthoglypta nickliniana awania)
- Helminthoglypta nickliniana bridgesi
- Helminthoglypta nickliniana contracosta
- Helminthoglypta sequoicola consors
- Dented peninsula snail (Helminthoglypta stiversiana miwoka)
- Helminthoglypta stiversiana williamsi
- Monadenia fidelis minor
- Rocky coast sideband (Monadenia fidelis pronotis)
- Monadenia mormonum buttoni
- Monadenia mormonum hirsuta
- Indian Yosemite snail (Monadenia yosemitensis yosemitensis)

==== Camaenids ====
- Amplirhagada herbertena
- Cristigibba wesselensis
- Eximiorhagada asperrima
- Mandarina anijimana
- Mandarina aureola
- Mandarina chichijimana
- Mandarina exoptata
- Mandarina hahajimana
- Mandarina hirasei
- Mandarina luhuana
- Mandarina mandarina
- Mandarina polita
- Mandarina ponderosa
- Mandarina suenoae
- Mua treesnail (Noctepuna muensis)

==== Lauriids ====
- Leiostyla castanea
- Leiostyla fuscidula
- Leiostyla taeniata
- Leiostyla tesselata
- Leiostyla vermiculosa

==== Vertiginids ====
- Truncatellina atomus
- Truncatellina laeviuscula
- Truncatellina linearis
- Truncatellina purpuraria
- Truncatellina uniarmata
- Vertigo paradoxa

==== Bradybaenids ====
Species

- Aegista inexpectata
- Aegista intonsa
- Anixa carbonaria
- Anixa cumingii
- Anixa phloiodes
- Euhadra murayamai
- Euhadra nachicola
- Euhadra sadoensis
- Helicostyla zebuensis
- Paraegista apoiensis

Subspecies

- Euhadra scaevola mikawa

==== Helicids ====
- Assyriella bellardii
- Chilostoma cingulatum
- Chilostoma edlaueri
- Chilostoma istriana
- Chilostoma planospira
- Drobacia banatica
- Drobacia maeotica
- Helix anatolica
- Helix borealis
- Helix delpretiana
- Helix ligata
- Hemicycla berkeleii
- Hemicycla distensa
- Hemicycla ethelema
- Hemicycla fritschi
- Hemicycla gaudryi
- Hemicycla gomerensis
- Hemicycla granomalleata
- Hemicycla guamartemes
- Hemicycla hedybia
- Hemicycla maugeana
- Hemicycla paivanopsis
- Hemicycla planorbella
- Hemicycla psathyra
- Hemicycla vermiplicata
- Marmorana fuscolabiata
- Marmorana platychela
- Marmorana scabriuscula
- Superba vikosensis
- Theba andalusica
- Theba geminata

==== Hygromiids ====
- Actinella robusta
- Geomitra watsoni
- Helicella bolenensis
- Helicella nubigena
- Helicella sabulivaga
- Helicopsis arenosa
- Heterostoma desertae
- Heterostoma duplex
- Metafruticicola naxianus
- Metafruticicola nicosianus
- Monacha dirphica
- Monacha euboeica
- Monacha lamalouensis
- Ponentina revelata
- Trochoidea carinatoglobosa
- Trochoidea tarentina
- Trochulus alpicola
- Trochulus coelomphala
- Trochulus montanus
- Trochulus piccardi
- Trochulus plebeius
- Trochulus suberecta
- Urticicola isaricus
- Urticicola moutonii
- Urticicola suberinus
- Xerocrassa cobosi
- Xerocrassa geyeri
- Xerocrassa grata
- Xerolenta razlogi
- Xerosecta dohrni
- Xerosecta hillyeriana
- Xerosecta terverii
- Xerotricha crispolanata
- Xerotricha mariae
- Xerotricha nodosostriata
- Xerotricha renei
- Xerotricha zujarensis

==== Enids ====
- Chondrula bergeri
- Chondrula consentanea
- Chondrula minuta
- Ena elongata
- Luchuena hachijoensis
- Napaeus anaga
- Napaeus chrysaloides
- Napaeus flavoterminatus
- Napaeus gruereanus
- Napaeus indifferens
- Napaeus inflatiusculus
- Napaeus interpunctatus
- Napaeus lowei
- Napaeus maffioteanus
- Napaeus ocellatus
- Napaeus palmaensis
- Napaeus propinquus
- Napaeus savinosa
- Napaeus servus
- Napaeus severus
- Napaeus subgracilior
- Napaeus subsimplex
- Napaeus texturatus

==== Other Stylommatophora ====
Species

- Acanthinula spinifera
- Achatina vignoniana
- Agardhiella extravaganta
- Archachatina knorri
- Arion obesoductus
- Arion simrothi
- Arion vejdowskyi
- Atlantica engonatus
- Santa Barbara shelled slug (Binneya notabilis)
- Cecilioides nyctelia
- Eucobresia glacialis
- Eucobresia nivalis
- Granaria variabilis
- Halolimnohelix conradti
- Helicodonta langhofferi
- Hypnophila remyi
- Monilearia inops
- Monilearia praeposita
- Monilearia watsoniana
- Neophaedusa spelaeonis
- Orcula dobrogica
- Orcula spoliata
- Pagodulina austeniana
- Pagodulina tschapecki
- Phenacolimax stabilei
- Solatopupa guidoni
- Solatopupa pallida
- Streptostyla turgidula
- Streptostyla wani
- Strobilops sp. 1
- Chittenango ovate amber snail (Succinea chittenangoensis)
- Succinea guamensis
- Succinea philippinica
- Tandonia nigra
- Thapsia grandis
- Thapsia microsculpta
- Thapsia usambarensis
- Thyrophorella thomensis
- Vallonia allamanica
- Vallonia enniensis
- Vitrea inae
- Vitrea striata
- Vitrinobrachium tridentinum
- Xenodiscula taintori

Subspecies

- Idaho banded mountain snail (Oreohelix idahoensis idahoensis)
- Carinated striate banded mountain snail (Oreohelix strigosa goniogyra)

=== Littorinimorpha ===
There are 565 species and one subspecies in the order Littorinimorpha evaluated as data deficient.

==== Strombids ====
- Ophioglossolambis violacea

==== Pomatiids ====
- Chondropoma callipeplum
- Tropidophora carinata
- Tropidophora michaudi

==== Hydrobiids ====
- Akiyoshia kishiiana
- Akiyoshia orientalis
- Akiyoshia sachalinensis
- Alzoniella murita
- Alzoniella pyrenaica
- Aphaostracon xynoelictum
- Austropyrgus bunyaensis
- Austropyrgus elongatus
- Austropyrgus halletensis
- Austropyrgus tateiformis
- Avenionia bourguignati
- Belgrandia bigorrensis
- Belgrandia cazioti
- Belgrandia coutagnei
- Belgrandia dunalina
- Belgrandia ionica
- Belgrandia marginata
- Belgrandia minuscula
- Belgrandia targoniana
- Belgrandia zilchi
- Belgrandiella abchasica
- Belgrandiella bumasta
- Belgrandiella koprivnensis
- Belgrandiella krupensis
- Belgrandiella kuesteri
- Belgrandiella kusceri
- Belgrandiella nana
- Belgrandiella novoselensis
- Belgrandiella pageti
- Belgrandiella robusta
- Belgrandiella seminium
- Bucharamnicola bucharica
- Bythinella abbreviata
- Bythinella bertrandi
- Bythinella bouleti
- Rhön spring snail (Bythinella compressa)
- Bythinella cretensis
- Bythinella cylindracea
- Bythinella darrieuxii
- Bythinella dunkeri
- Bythinella kosensis
- Bythinella kubotai
- Bythinella ligurica
- Bythinella magna
- Bythinella nothites
- Bythinella padana
- Bythinella pyrenaica
- Bythinella samecana
- Bythinella serborientalis
- Bythinella servainiana
- Bythinella sordida
- Bythinella troyana
- Bythinella turriculata
- Bythinella vesontiana
- Bythinella walkeri
- Bythiospeum alzense
- Bythiospeum carpathica
- Bythiospeum excelsior
- Bythiospeum excessum
- Bythiospeum michaudi
- Bythiospeum moussonianum
- Bythiospeum racovitzai
- Bythiospeum sandbergeri
- Bythiospeum senefelderi
- Bythiospeum terveri
- Caspia gmelinii
- Caspia stanislavi
- Caspiohydrobia behningi
- Caspiohydrobia elongata
- Caspiohydrobia gemmata
- Caspiohydrobia grimmi
- Caspiohydrobia pavlovskii
- Caspiohydrobia sogdiana
- Cilgia dalmatica
- Cochliopina compacta
- Daudebardiella asiana
- Falniowskia neglectissima
- Falsibelgrandiella bunarica
- Falsipyrgula bakhtarana
- Fluvidona dorrigoensis
- Fluviopupa jeanyvesi
- Fontigens binneyana
- Tapered cavesnail (Fontigens holsingeri)
- Blue Ridge springsnail (Fontigens orolibas)
- Fontigens weberi
- Geyeria valvataeformis
- Godlewskia columella
- Graziana vrbasensis
- Hadopyrgus dubius
- Hadopyrgus expositus
- Hadziella thermalis
- Hauffenia edlaueri
- Hauffenia erythropomatia
- Hauffenia kissdalmae
- Heideella andreae
- Heideella dolichia
- Hemistomia beaumonti
- Horatia ljovuschkini
- Horatia parvula
- Hydrobia atuca
- Hydrobia balfouri
- Hydrobia cattaroensis
- Hydrobia declinata
- Hydrobia elachista
- Hydrobia faminensis
- Hydrobia gabonensis
- Hydrobia glaucovirens
- Hydrobia lineata
- Hydrobia montenegrina
- Hydrobia newtoni
- Hydrobia pontieuxini
- Hydrobia semistriata
- Hydrobia soosi
- Hydrobia sordida
- Iberhoratia aurorae
- Iglica alpeus
- Iglica bosnica
- Iglica eximia
- Iglica gittenbergeri
- Iglica illyrica
- Iglica karamani
- Iglica maasseni
- Iglica relicta
- Indopyrgus nevilli
- Islamia archeducis
- Islamia bourguignati
- Islamia coronadoi
- Islamia germaini
- Islamia latina
- Islamia valvataeformis
- Istriana falkneri
- Jardinella thaanumi
- Kanakyella gentilsiana
- Kolhymamnicola wasiliewae
- Lanzaia bosnica
- Lanzaia edlaueri
- Lanzaia elephantotus
- Lithoglyphus prasinus
- Lithoglyphus pygmaeus
- Littoridina boetzkesi
- Littoridina compacta
- Littoridina coquimbensis
- Littoridina loaensis
- Littoridina oblonga
- Littoridina opachensis
- Littoridina pachispira
- Littoridina pedrina
- Littoridina santiagensis
- Lobogenes michaelis
- Lyhnidia sublitoralis
- Armored marstonia (Marstonia pachyta)
- Martensamnicola kazakhstanica
- Mercuria baudoniana
- Mercuria edmundi
- Mercuria emiliana
- Mercuria maceana
- Mercuria perforata
- Mercuria tachoensis
- Meridiopyrgus inanga
- Meridiopyrgus pupiformis
- Mexipyrgus carranzae
- Mienisiella mienisi
- Neohoratia minuta
- Ohridohauffenia sublitoralis
- Opacuincola abradeta
- Opacuincola conosimilis
- Opacuincola favus
- Opacuincola fruticis
- Opacuincola geometrica
- Opacuincola ignorata
- Opacuincola kuscheli
- Opacuincola mete
- Opacuincola piriformis
- Opacuincola roscoei
- Opacuincola takakaensis
- Opacuincola terraelapsus
- Opacuincola turriformis
- Paladilhiopsis blanci
- Paladilhiopsis bosniaca
- Paladilhiopsis brandisi
- Paladilhiopsis pulcherrima
- Paladilhiopsis schakuranica
- Paladilhiopsis solida
- Paladilhiopsis subovata
- Paladilhiopsis tarae
- Peringia mabilli
- Phrantela richardsoni
- Phreatoceras taylori
- Crowned cavesnail (Phreatodrobia coronae)
- Domed cavesnail (Phreatodrobia nugax)
- Beaked cavesnail (Phreatodrobia rotunda)
- Plagigeyeria edlaueri
- Plagigeyeria klemmi
- Plagigeyeria minuta
- Plagigeyeria mostarensis
- Plagigeyeria nitida
- Plagigeyeria piroti
- Plagigeyeria plagiostoma
- Plagigeyeria robusta
- Platypyrgus nelsonensis
- Plesiella guipuzcoa
- Plesiella navarrensis
- Potamolithus doeringi
- Potamolithus filipponei
- Potamolithus paysanduanus
- Pristinicola hemphilli
- Pseudamnicola astierii
- Pseudamnicola beckmanni
- Pseudamnicola brachia
- Pseudamnicola confinis
- Pseudamnicola constantinae
- Pseudamnicola depressispira
- Pseudamnicola dobrogica
- Pseudamnicola elbursensis
- Pseudamnicola exilis
- Pseudamnicola granjaensis
- Pseudamnicola hinzi
- Pseudamnicola kotschyi
- Pseudamnicola leontina
- Pseudamnicola luisi
- Pseudamnicola luteola
- Pseudamnicola macrostoma
- Pseudamnicola navasiana
- Pseudamnicola orsinii
- Pseudamnicola penchinati
- Pseudamnicola razelmiana
- Pseudamnicola sciaccaensis
- Pseudamnicola vinarskii
- Pseudamnicola virescens
- Pseudopaludinella cygnea
- Pseudorientalia natolica
- Diamond Y springsnail (Pseudotryonia adamantina)
- Pyrgula abichi
- Pyrgula acicula
- Pyrgula behningi
- Pyrgula cincta
- Pyrgula ebersini
- Pyrgula falkneri
- Pyrgula grimmi
- Pyrgula isseli
- Pyrgula kolesnikoviana
- Pyrgula nossovi
- Pyrgula pambotis
- Pyrgula pulla
- Pyrgula rudis
- Pyrgula sowinskyi
- Chupadera springsnail (Pyrgulopsis chupaderae)
- Crystal Spring springsnail (Pyrgulopsis crystalis)
- Davis County springsnail (Pyrgulopsis davisi)
- Fairbanks springsnail (Pyrgulopsis fairbanksensis)
- Elongate-gland springsnail (Pyrgulopsis isolata)
- Salton sea springsnail (Pyrgulopsis longinqua)
- Page springsnail (Pyrgulopsis morrisoni)
- Distal-gland springsnail (Pyrgulopsis nanus)
- Pecos springsnail (Pyrgulopsis pecosensis)
- Median-gland Nevada springsnail (Pyrgulopsis pisteri)
- Fossil springsnail (Pyrgulopsis simplex)
- Brown springsnail (Pyrgulopsis sola)
- Radomaniola bosniaca
- Radomaniola gaillardoti
- Rakiurapyrgus micula
- Rehderiella siamensis
- Sadleriana affinis
- Sadleriana bavarica
- Sadleriana bulgarica
- Sadleriana byzanthina
- Sarajana apfelbecki
- Saxurinator hadzii
- Saxurinator microbeliscus
- Saxurinator schlickumi
- Golden pebblesnail (Somatogyrus aureus)
- Angular pebblesnail (Somatogyrus biangulatus)
- Knotty pebblesnail (Somatogyrus constrictus)
- Hidden pebblesnail (Somatogyrus decipiens)
- Ovate pebblesnail (Somatogyrus excavatus)
- Granite pebblesnail (Somatogyrus hinkleyi)
- Moon pebblesnail (Somatogyrus obtusus)
- Sparrow pebblesnail (Somatogyrus parvulus)
- Tallapoosa pebblesnail (Somatogyrus pilsbryanus)
- Mud pebblesnail (Somatogyrus sargenti)
- Somatogyrus trothis
- Coldwater pebblesnail (Somatogyrus tryoni)
- Sororipyrgus marshalli
- Terrestribythinella baidashnikovi
- Torosia proschwitzi
- Turkmenamnicola smaragdovae
- Turricaspia astrachanica
- Turricaspia chersonica
- Turricaspia conus
- Turricaspia dagestanica
- Turricaspia pullula
- Turricaspia sajenkovae
- Turricaspia spasskii
- Turricaspia trivialis
- Valvatamnicola archangelskii
- Vinodolia zetaevallis

==== Cochliopids ====
- Aroapyrgus colombiensis
- Aroapyrgus panamensis
- Heleobia achaja
- Heleobia ameghini
- Heleobia arenaria
- Heleobia atacamensis
- Heleobia canariensis
- Heleobia chavezi
- Heleobia dalmatica
- Heleobia florezii
- Heleobia hernandezae
- Heleobia longiscata
- Heleobia macei
- Heleobia maltzani
- Heleobia rausiana
- Heleobia steindachneri
- Heleobia streletzkiensis
- Heleobia sublineata
- Heleobia vestita
- Nurekia triculiformis
- Alamosa springsnail (Tryonia alamosae)
- Sportingoods tryonia (Tryonia angulata)
- Cheatum's snail (Tryonia cheatumi)
- Grated tryonia (Tryonia clathrata)
- Point of Rocks tryonia (Tryonia elata)
- Minute tryonia (Tryonia ericae)
- Gila tryonia (Tryonia gilae)
- California brackish water snail (Tryonia imitator)
- Koster's tryonia (Tryonia kosteri)
- Quitabaquito tryonia (Tryonia quitobaquitae)
- Tryonia tricarinata
- Amargosa tryonia (Tryonia variegata)

==== Bithyniids ====
Species

- Bithynia boissieri
- Bithynia chaperi
- Bithynia forcarti
- Bithynia hambergerae
- Bithynia hareerensis
- Bithynia hellenica
- Bithynia lithoglyphoides
- Bithynia majewskyi
- Bithynia majorcina
- Bithynia mazandaranensis
- Bithynia montenegrina
- Bithynia moreletiana
- Bithynia morleti
- Bithynia mostarensis
- Bithynia nakeae
- Bithynia numidica
- Bithynia oxiana
- Bithynia pygmaea
- Bithynia schwabii
- Bithynia textum
- Bithynia thatkeana
- Bithynia walderdorffii
- Bithynia walkeri
- Bithynia wykoffi
- Gabbia carinata
- Gabbia lacustris
- Gabbia lutaria
- Gabbia napierensis
- Gabbia rotunda
- Gabbia tumida
- Gabbiella araxena
- Gabbiella balovalensis
- Gabbiella kichwambae
- Gabbiella neumanni
- Gabbiella walleri
- Gabbiella zambica
- Hydrobioides nana
- Hydrobioides turrita
- Jubaia excentrica
- Paraelona milachevitchi
- Parafossarulus sungariensis
- Pseudobithynia gittenbergeri
- Pseudobithynia hemmeni
- Pseudobithynia renei
- Pseudobithynia zogari
- Sataria everzardi

Subspecies

- Gabbiella humerosa tanganyicensis

==== Moitessieriids ====
- Clameia brooki
- Moitessieria barrinae
- Moitessieria bourguignati
- Moitessieria cocheti
- Moitessieria collellensis
- Moitessieria fontsaintei
- Moitessieria meijersae
- Moitessieria notenboomi
- Moitessieria robresia
- Moitessieria seminiana
- Moitessieria servaini
- Paladilhia pontmartiniana
- Palaospeum hispanicum
- Palaospeum nanum
- Palaospeum septentrionalis
- Sardopaladilhia buccina
- Sardopaladilhia distorta
- Sardopaladilhia marianae
- Sardopaladilhia subdistorta
- Spiralix affinitatis
- Spiralix burgensis
- Spiralix burgundina
- Spiralix collieri
- Spiralix hofmanni
- Spiralix puteana

==== Assimineids ====
- Angustassiminea yoshidayukioi
- Assiminea bella
- Assiminea borneensis
- Assiminea cardonae
- Assiminea estuarina
- Assiminea hessei
- Assiminea hungerfordiana
- Assiminea keniana
- Assiminea kurodai
- Assiminea mesopotamica
- Assiminea moellendorffi
- Assiminea palauensis
- Assiminea possietica
- Assiminea similis
- Cavernacmella yamamotonis
- Conacmella vagans
- Cyclotropis papuensis
- Eussoia aethiopica
- Eussoia leptodonta
- Eussoia oblonga
- Heteropoma fulva
- Heteropoma glabratum
- Heteropoma pyramis
- Heteropoma quadrasi
- Heteropoma tuberculatum
- Heteropoma turritum
- Omphalotropis albocarinata
- Omphalotropis carolinensis
- Omphalotropis ceramensis
- Omphalotropis cookei
- Omphalotropis elegans
- Omphalotropis elongatula
- Omphalotropis erosa
- Omphalotropis fragilis
- Omphalotropis gracilis
- Omphalotropis guamensis
- Omphalotropis hispida
- Omphalotropis howeinsulae
- Omphalotropis laevigata
- Omphalotropis laticosta
- Omphalotropis latilabris
- Omphalotropis layardiana
- Omphalotropis mutica
- Omphalotropis ochthogyra
- Omphalotropis picta
- Omphalotropis pilosa
- Omphalotropis quadrasi
- Omphalotropis semicostulata
- Omphalotropis sp. 2
- Omphalotropis striatapila
- Omphalotropis submaritima
- Omphalotropis suteri
- Omphalotropis suturalis
- Omphalotropis tumidula
- Omphalotropis vohimenae
- Paludinella conica
- Paludinella halophila
- Paludinella minima
- Paludinella semperi
- Paludinella vitrea
- Ponapella pihapiha
- Pseudassiminea waigiouensis
- Pseudocyclotus rugatellus
- Quadrasiella clathrata
- Quadrasiella mucronata
- Thaanumella angulosa
- Thaanumella cookei
- Tutuilana striata
- Wrayanna soluta

==== Pomatiopsids ====
- Cecina alta
- Coxiella pyrrhostoma
- Erhaia banepaensis
- Erhaia chandeshwariensis
- Erhaia sugurensis
- Hubendickia chinensis
- Hubendickia cingulata
- Hubendickia coronata
- Hubendickia cylindrica
- Hubendickia velimirovichi
- Hydrorissoia cambodiensis
- Hydrorissoia elegans
- Hydrorissoia elongata
- Jullienia acuta
- Jullienia crooki
- Jullienia microsculpta
- Jullienia munensis
- Jullienia nodulosa
- Jullienia tricostata
- Lacunopsis monodonta
- Lacunopsis rolfbrandti
- Lacunopsis sphaerica
- Lacunopsis ventricosa
- Neotricula minutoides
- Pachydrobia dubiosa
- Pachydrobia fischeriana
- Pachydrobia scalaroides
- Pacific walker (Pomatiopsis californica)
- Sibirobythinella almaatina
- Tomichia guillemei
- Tomichia hendrickxi
- Tomichia kivuensis
- Tricula fuchsi
- Tricula godawariensis
- Tricula gravelyi
- Tricula heudei
- Tricula horae
- Tricula humida
- Tricula martini
- Tricula taylori

==== Lithoglyphids ====
- Benedictia kotyensis
- Benedictia nana
- Moapa pebblesnail (Fluminicola avernalis)
- Columbia pebblesnail (Fluminicola columbiana)
- Pyramid Lake pebblesnail (Fluminicola dalli)
- Pahranagat pebblesnail (Fluminicola merriami)
- Nugget pebblesnail (Fluminicola seminalis)
- Kobeltocochlea falsipumyla
- Kobeltocochlea lindholmiana
- Kobeltocochlea olchonensis
- Lithoglyphopsis grandis
- Lithoglyphopsis modestus
- Lithoglyphopsis viridulus

==== Amnicolids ====
- Baicalia angarensis
- Baicalia cancellata
- Baicalia duthiersi
- Baicalia dybowkskiana
- Baicalia elata
- Baicalia florii
- Baicalia jentteriana
- Baicalia nana
- Baicalia pulchella
- Baicalia semenkewitschi
- Baicalia wrzeniowskii
- Baicalia zachwatkini
- Emmericia narentana

==== Stenothyrids ====
- Gangetia burmana
- Stenothyra acuta
- Stenothyra annandalei
- Stenothyra arabica
- Stenothyra decapitata
- Stenothyra echinata
- Stenothyra foveolata
- Stenothyra maculata
- Stenothyra mcmulleni
- Stenothyra microsculpta
- Stenothyra nana
- Stenothyra perdives
- Stenothyra prasongi
- Stenothyra roseni
- Stenothyra schlickumi
- Stenothyra spinosa
- Stenothyra spiralis
- Stenothyra woodmasoniana

==== Iravadiids ====
- Iravadia annadalei
- Iravadia funerea
- Iravadia nipponica
- Iravadia princeps
- Iravadia subquadrata

==== Truncatellids ====
- Taheitia alata
- Taheitia lamellicosta
- Taheitia mariannarum
- Taheitia parvula

=== Sorbeoconcha ===
There are 97 species and one subspecies in the order Sorbeoconcha evaluated as data deficient.

==== Batillarids ====
- Batillaria mutata

==== Pleurocerids ====
- Knobby rocksnail (Lithasia curta)
- Jay's river snail (Lithasia jayana)
- Elk River file snail (Lithasia lima)
- Noble hornsnail (Pleurocera nobilis)
- Broken hornsnail (Pleurocera postelli)

==== Melanopsids ====
- Melanopsis arbalensis
- Melanopsis cariosa
- Melanopsis denegabilis
- Melanopsis sobriewskii
- Melanopsis turgida
- Melanopsis turkmenica

==== Semisulcospirids ====
- Oasis juga (Juga laurae)

==== Thiarids ====
- Aylacostoma osculati
- Hemisinus guayaquilensis
- Melania canalis
- Melania erosa
- Melanoides angolensis
- Melanoides bavayi
- Melanoides costellaris
- Melanoides liebrechtsi
- Melanoides magnifica
- Melanoides manguensis
- Melanoides nodicincta
- Melanoides nyangweensis
- Melanoides nyassana
- Melanoides pamiricus
- Melanoides peregrina
- Melanoides pergracilis
- Melanoides rufescens
- Melanoides turris
- Neoradina charon
- Neoradina multistriata
- Neoradina pirenoidea
- Neoradina zelebori
- Semisulcospira diminuta
- Semisulcospira hongkongensis
- Semisulcospira pacificans
- Sermyla sculpta
- Stenomelania uniformis
- Thiara baldwini
- Thiara kauaiensis
- Thiara rudicostis
- Thiara scitula
- Thiara terpsichore

==== Pachychilids ====
- Brotia cylindrus
- Brotia insolita
- Brotia jullieni
- Brotia kelantanensis
- Brotia siamensis
- Lithasiopsis mexicanus
- Pachychilus oerstedi
- Paracrostoma martini
- Paracrostoma tigrinus
- Potadoma buttikoferi
- Potadoma liberiensis
- Potadoma riperti
- Potadoma schoutedeni
- Potadoma togoensis
- Sulcospira dautzenbergiana
- Sulcospira delavayana
- Sulcospira sulcospira
- Sulcospira swinhoei

==== Paludomids ====
Species

- Anceya terebriformis
- Bridouxia smithiana
- Cleopatra guillemei
- Cleopatra hemmingi
- Cleopatra langi
- Martelia dautzenbergi
- Martelia tanganyicensis
- Paludomus andersoniana
- Paludomus annandalei
- Paludomus burmanica
- Paludomus cinctus
- Paludomus dhuma
- Paludomus globulosa
- Paludomus inflatus
- Paludomus loricatus
- Paludomus nana
- Paludomus nigricans
- Paludomus palustris
- Paludomus parvula
- Paludomus pustulosa
- Paludomus rotunda
- Paludomus siamensis
- Paludomus stomatodon
- Bella snail (Paludomus sulcatus)
- Paramelania crassigranulata
- Paramelania imperialis
- Paramelania minor
- Potadomoides bequaerti
- Potadomoides broecki
- Potadomoides hirta
- Pseudocleopatra voltana
- Reymondia pyramidalis
- Stanleya neritinoides
- Vinundu guillemei

Subspecies

- Cleopatra bulimoides pauli

=== Architaenioglossa ===
There are 106 species and one subspecies in the order Architaenioglossa evaluated as data deficient.

==== Neocyclotids ====
- Kondoraphe kiyokoae
- Ostodes brazieri
- Paramiella incisa
- Paramiella kondoi

==== Cyclophorids ====
Species

- Awalycaeus akiratadai
- Chamalychaeus expanstoma
- Chamalychaeus miyazakii
- Chamalychaeus takahashii
- Chamalychaeus yanoshigehumii
- Cipangochalax placeonovitas
- Cipangocharax okamurai
- Cyathopoma nishinoi
- Japonia hispida
- Japonia shigetai
- Japonia striatula
- Nobuea kurodai

Subspecies

- Chamalychaeus itonis nakashimai

==== Pupinids ====
- Cytora hirsutissima
- Pupina brenchleyi
- Pupina complanata

==== Diplommatinids ====
- Cochlostoma intermedium
- Cochlostoma kleciaki
- Diplommatina circumstomata
- Diplommatina lateralis
- Malarinia calcopercula
- Palaina chrysalis
- Palaina dohrni
- Palaina doliolum
- Palaina graeffei
- Palaina kubaryi
- Palaina ovatula
- Palaina quadrata
- Palaina scalarina
- Palaina taeniolata
- Palaina tuberosa
- Palaina xiphidium
- Plectostoma annandalei
- Pseudopalaina ascendens

==== Aciculids ====
- Acicula douctouyrensis
- Menkia dewinteri
- Menkia rolani
- Renea elegantissima

==== Viviparids ====
- Angulyagra boettgeri
- Anulotaia mekongensis
- Bellamya crassispiralis
- Bellamya ecclesi
- Bellamya jeffreysi
- Bellamya leopoldvillensis
- Bellamya micron
- Bellamya trochlearis
- Cipangopaludina annandalei
- Contectiana ladogensis
- Eyriesia eyriesi
- Filopaludina miveruensis
- Mekongia bocourti
- Mekongia lamarcki
- Mekongia rattei
- Mekongia turbinata
- Notopala tricincta
- Rivularia auriculata
- Sinotaia heudei
- Taia elitoralis
- Taia intha
- Taia shanensis
- Viviparus angularis
- Viviparus boettgeri
- Ochlockonee mysterysnail (Viviparus limi)
- Viviparus mamillatus
- Viviparus polyzonatus
- Viviparus tricinctus

==== Ampullariids ====
- Felipponea iheringi
- Lanistes graueri
- Lanistes nasutus
- Pila aperta
- Pila nevilliana
- Pila olea
- Pila saxea
- Pila speciosa
- Pomacea baeri
- Pomacea camena
- Pomacea catamarcensis
- Pomacea chemnitzii
- Pomacea conoidea
- Pomacea cornucopia
- Pomacea costaricana
- Pomacea cousini
- Pomacea cubensis
- Pomacea eximia
- Pomacea gigantea
- Pomacea hollingsworthi
- Pomacea interrupta
- Pomacea martinezi
- Pomacea modesta
- Pomacea pallens
- Pomacea pealiana
- Pomacea pomum
- Pomacea prourceus
- Pomacea pulchra
- Pomacea puntaplaya
- Pomacea reflexa
- Pomacea reyrei
- Pomacea spirata
- Pomacea tenuissima
- Pomacea vexillum
- Pomacea zischkai
- Saulea vitrea
- Turbinicola aperta

=== Lower Heterobranchia species ===
- Great Lake snail (Benthodorbis pawpela)
- Borysthenia jelskii
- Glacidorbis bicarinatus
- Glacidorbis pedderi
- Megalovalvata demersa
- Morrisonietta acicula
- Morrisonietta bandonensis
- Morrisonietta gracilis
- Morrisonietta krungtepensis
- Valvata andreaei
- Valvata bathybia
- Valvata japonica
- Valvata nilotica
- Valvata revoili
- Threeridge valvata (Valvata tricarinata)

=== Cycloneritimorpha ===
There are 30 species and two subspecies in the order Cycloneritimorpha evaluated as data deficient.

==== Helicinids ====
Species

- Ogasawarana arata
- Ogasawarana capsula
- Ogasawarana comes
- Ogasawarana discrepans
- Ogasawarana hirasei
- Ogasawarana microtheca
- Ogasawarana nitida
- Ogasawarana ogasawarana
- Ogasawarana optima
- Sturanyella carolinarum
- Sturanyella epicharis

Subspecies

- Pleuropoma zigzac ponapense
- Pleuropoma zigzac zigzac

==== Hydrocenids ====
- Georissa biangulata
- Georissa elegans
- Georissa laevigata
- Georissa rufula

==== Neritids ====
- Clithon bougainvillei
- Clithon fuliginosum
- Anchialine pool snail (Neritilia hawaiiensis)
- Neritina perottetiana
- Neritina platyconcha
- Neritina plumbea
- Weakly cut nerite (Neritodryas subsulcata)
- Septaria laperousei
- Septaria macrocephala
- Theodoxus cinctellus
- Theodoxus euphraticus
- Theodoxus maresi
- Theodoxus pallasi
- Theodoxus saulcyi
- Theodoxus syriacus

=== Hygrophila species ===
There are 197 Hygrophila species evaluated as data deficient.

==== Physids ====
- Archiphysa laphami
- Sonoma physa (Archiphysa sonomae)
- Caribnauta harryi
- Haitia venustula
- Mayabina obtusa
- Mayabina petenensis
- Mexinauta impluviatus
- Mexinauta peruvianus
- Cloaked physa (Physa megalochlamys)
- Physa taslei
- Snake River physa snail (Physella natricina)
- Sibirenauta aenigma
- Ultraphysella sinaloae

==== Acroloxids ====
- Acroloxus arachleicus
- Acroloxus klucharevae
- Acroloxus kolhymensis
- Acroloxus orientalis
- Acroloxus pseudolacustris
- Baicalancylus njurgonicus
- Pseudancylastrum olgae
- Pseudancylastrum poberezhnyi
- Pseudancylastrum troschelii

==== Planorbids ====
- Aenigmomphisicola europaea
- Ancylus aduncus
- Ancylus regularis
- Ancylus striatus
- Anisus carinea
- Anisus correctus
- Anisus iturupensis
- Anisus johanseni
- Anisus kussakini
- Anisus noziriensis
- Anisus stelmachoetius
- Anisus strauchianus
- Anisus substroemi
- Anisus terekholicus
- Anisus thermochukchensis
- Anisus tugurensis
- Lesser ramshorn snail (Anisus vorticulus)
- Anisus zhirmunskii
- Armiger annandalei
- Armiger schamaricus
- Biomphalaria barthi
- Biomphalaria edisoni
- Biomphalaria raimondi
- Biomphalaria rhodesiensis
- Biomphalaria salinarum
- Biomphalaria stanleyi
- Biomphalaria thermala
- Biomphalaria trygira
- Bulinus barthi
- Bulinus browni
- Bulinus crystallinus
- Bulinus hexaploidus
- Bulinus octoploidus
- Bulinus permembranaceus
- Bulinus transversalis
- Burnupia alta
- Burnupia brunnea
- Burnupia caffra
- Burnupia capensis
- Burnupia edwardiana
- Burnupia farquhari
- Burnupia gordonensis
- Burnupia kempi
- Burnupia kimiloloensis
- Burnupia mooiensis
- Burnupia nana
- Burnupia obtusata
- Burnupia ponsonbyi
- Burnupia stenochorias
- Burnupia transvaalensis
- Burnupia trapezoidea
- Burnupia verreauxi
- Burnupia vulcanus
- Burnupia walkeri
- Camptoceras austeni
- Camptoceras hirasei
- Camptoceras terebra
- Ceratophallus apertus
- Ceratophallus blanfordi
- Ceratophallus faini
- Ceratophallus socotrensis
- Ceratophallus subtilis
- Choanomphalus anomphalus
- Choanomphalus cryptomphalus
- Choanomphalus eurystomus
- Choanomphalus lindholmi
- Choanomphalus microtrochus
- Choanomphalus omphalotus
- Choanomphalus pygmaeus
- Culmenella rezvoji
- Beau's stream limpet (Ferrissia beaui)
- Ferrissia burnupi
- Ferrissia cawstoni
- Ferrissia ceylanica
- Ferrissia chudeaui
- Ferrissia clessiniana
- Ferrissia clifdeni
- Ferrissia connollyi
- Ferrissia eburnensis
- Ferrissia farquhari
- Ferrissia fontinalis
- Ferrissia junodi
- Ferrissia lacustris
- Ferrissia leonensis
- Ferrissia lhotelleriei
- Ferrissia natalensis
- Ferrissia pallaryi
- Ferrissia siamensis
- Ferrissia victoriensis
- Ferrissia viola
- Ferrissia zambesiensis
- Ferrissia zambiensis
- King George's freshwater snail (Glyptophysa georgiana)
- Glyptophysa oconnori
- Glyptophysa petiti
- Glyptophysa variabilis
- Gundlachia hubendicki
- Gundlachia lucasi
- Gundlachia neozelanica
- Gundlachia radiatus
- Gyraulus clymene
- Gyraulus edgbastonensis
- Gyraulus egirdirensis
- Gyraulus heudei
- Gyraulus hubendicki
- Gyraulus huwaizahensis
- Gyraulus pankongensis
- Gyraulus prasongi
- Gyraulus pulcher
- Gyraulus rossiteri
- Gyraulus taseviensis
- Gyraulus terraesacrae
- Gyraulus velifer
- Gyraulus zilchianus
- Helicorbis kushanica
- Helicorbis shilkaensis
- Helisoma peruvianum
- Hippeutis distinctus
- Hippeutis stossichi
- Kolhymorbis bogatovi
- Kolhymorbis dildorae
- Kolhymorbis shadini
- Marsh sprite (Micromenetus alabamensis)
- Sampson sprite (Micromenetus sampsoni)
- Physastra moluccensis
- Corpulent ramshorn (Planorbella corpulenta)
- Planorbella hornii
- Planorbis kubanicus
- Polypylis almaatina
- Polypylis starobogatovi
- Knobby ancylid (Rhodacmea hinkleyi)
- Segmentina avecenninae
- Segmentina cantori
- Segmentina caucasica
- Segmentina malkae
- Segmentina mica
- Segmentina petropolitana
- Segmentina servaini
- Segmentina starobogatovi
- Segmentina taia
- Segmentorbis eussoensis
- Segmentorbis planodiscus
- Trochorbis anastasiae
- Uncancylus patagonicus

==== Lymnaeids ====
- Hawaiian bugle (Erinna aulacospira)
- Alberta fossaria (Galba alberta)
- Galba perplexa
- Glossy fossaria (Galba perpolita)
- Lymnaea bakowskyana
- Lymnaea biacuminata
- Lymnaea carelica
- Lymnaea cucunorica
- Lymnaea curtacorvus
- Lymnaea dipkunensis
- Lymnaea horae
- Lymnaea shanensis
- Lymnaea tengriana
- Lymnaea vulnerata
- Glutinous snail (Myxas glutinosa)
- Omphiscola reticulata
- Radix hamadai
- Radix hookeri
- Radix lagotis
- Radix lilli
- Obese pondsnail (Stagnicola oronoensis)
- Stagnicola tekecus
- Stagnicola tungabhadraensis

==== Chilinids ====
- Chilina ampullacea
- Chilina elegans
- Chilina fluminea
- Chilina minuta
- Chilina robustior
- Chilina strebeli
- Chilina subcylindrica

==== Latiids ====
- Latia lateralis

=== Neogastropoda ===
There are 113 species in the order Neogastropoda evaluated as data deficient.

==== Turrids ====
- Agathothoma finalis
- Crassispira sacerdotalis
- Scaevatula amancicoi
- Scaevatula pellisserpentis

==== Marginellids ====
- Cysticus gutta
- Cysticus josephinae
- Gibberula cucullata
- Gibberula modica
- Gibberula puntillum
- Granulina parilis
- Marginella chalmersi
- Marginella gemma
- Marginella liparozona
- Marginella melvilli
- Rivomarginella morrisoni
- Volvarina insulana

==== Buccinids ====
- Clea broti
- Clea jullieni
- Clea spinosa
- Paradoxa confirmata
- Paradoxa thomensis

==== Muricids ====
- Muricopsis mariangelae
- Muricopsis matildae
- Muricopsis principensis
- Neorapana grandis

==== Conids ====
- Spindle cone (Conus aculeiformis)
- Conus alabaster
- Andaman cone (Conus andamanensis)
- Conus angioiorum
- Conus auratinus
- Conus austroviola
- Conus bellocqae
- Conus bellulus
- Bianca's cone (Conus biancae)
- Conus blanfordianus
- Conus bondarevi
- Conus bonfiglioli
- Conus broderipii
- Conus capreolus
- Conus chiapponorum
- Conus ciderryi
- Conus colmani
- Conus damasoi
- Conus danilai
- Conus dieteri
- Glory of India cone (Conus eduardi)
- Conus eldredi
- Conus escondidai
- Conus estivali
- Conus evansi
- Fragile geography cone (Conus fragilissimus)
- Fraussen's cone (Conus frausseni)
- Conus gabryae
- Conus giorossii
- Conus gordyi
- Conus gratacapii
- Conus habui
- Conus hamamotoi
- Conus hamanni
- Honker's cone (Conus honkeri)
- Conus hypochlorus
- Conus ignotus
- Conus ikedai
- Conus joliveti
- Conus jourdani
- Conus kawamurai
- Conus kerstitchi
- Conus kiicumulus
- Conus kohni
- Conus kuiperi
- Conus leekremeri
- Conus lenhilli
- Conus lentiginosus
- Conus lightbourni
- Conus luteus
- Conus mcbridei
- Conus milesi
- Conus miniexcelsus
- Conus moncuri
- Conus moylani
- Conus nigromaculatus
- Conus nocturnus
- Conus olgae
- Conus pacificus
- Conus patamakanthini
- Conus pauperculus
- Conus peli
- Conus pepeiu
- Conus pseudimperialis
- Conus pseudokimioi
- Asprella (Conus pseudorbignyi)
- Conus richardsae
- Conus richeri
- Conus rizali
- Conus salzmanni
- Conus sartii
- Conus sauros
- Conus scalptus
- Conus scopulicola
- Conus sculpturatus
- Conus smirna
- Conus solomonensis
- Clay cone (Conus splendidulus)
- Conus subulatus
- Conus swainsoni
- Conus sydneyensis
- Conus tirardi
- Conus troendlei
- Conus tuberculosus
- Conus vaubani
- Conus wallangra
- Conus wilsi
- Conus zebra

=== Eupulmonata ===
- Auriculodes gangetica
- Auriculodes gaziensis
- Ellobium chinense
- Laemodonta amplicata
- Laemodonta exaratoides
- Laemodonta oblonga
- Melampus massauensis

=== Archaeopulmonata ===
- Salinator sanchezi
- Salinator swatowensis

== Bivalvia ==
There are 171 species and three subspecies in the class Bivalvia evaluated as data deficient.

=== Pectinida ===
- Nodipecten magnificus

=== Unionida ===
There are 95 species in the order Unionoida evaluated as data deficient.

==== Margaritiferids ====
- Margaritifera dahurica
- Margaritifera laevis

==== Unionids ====
- Elktoe (Alasmidonta marginata)
- Brook floater (Alasmidonta varicosa)
- Anemina euscaphys
- Anodonta cyrea
- Anodonta impura
- Oregon floater (Anodonta oregonensis)
- Giant freshwater clam (Chamberlainia hainesiana)
- Coelatura alluaudi
- Coelatura choziensis
- Coelatura cridlandi
- Coelatura kipopoensis
- Coelatura ratidota
- Cockscomb pearl mussel (Cristaria plicata)
- Edible naiad (Cyprogenia aberti)
- Diaurora aurorea
- Alabama spike (Elliptio arca)
- Sad elliptio (Elliptio cylindracea)
- Brother spike (Elliptio fraterna)
- Florida lance (Elliptio waltoni)
- Ensidens sagittarius
- Harmandia munensis
- Harmandia somboriensis
- Hyriopsis desowitzi
- Hyriopsis myersiana
- Inversidens brandtii
- Inversidens pantoensis
- Lamellidens scutum
- Lamellidens unioides
- Lamprotula bazini
- Lamprotula mansuyi
- Lamprotula salaputium
- Lamprotula tientsinensis
- Lamprotula zonata
- Lanceolaria cylindrica
- Lanceolaria grayii
- Lanceolaria triformis
- Lepidodesma languilati
- Nephronaias scamnata
- Nitia chefneuxi
- Nyassunio ujijiensis
- Oxynaia gladiator
- Parreysia annandalei
- Parreysia bhamoensis
- Parreysia chaudhurii
- Parreysia choprae
- Parreysia corbis
- Parreysia crispisulcata
- Parreysia cylindrica
- Parreysia feae
- Parreysia feddeni
- Parreysia humilis
- Parreysia nuttalliana
- Parreysia olivacea
- Parreysia pecten
- Parreysia perconvexa
- Physunio micropteroides
- Physunio velaris
- Pilsbryoconcha suilla
- Canoe creek pigtoe (Pleurobema athearni)
- Pseudanodonta elongata
- Pseudodon avae
- Pseudodon cambodjensis
- Pseudodon crebristriata
- Pseudodon peguensis
- Pseudodon thomsoni
- Rectidens sumatrensis
- Scabies chinensis
- Scabies nucleus
- Sinanodonta ogurae
- Solenaia emarginata
- Solenaia khwaenoiensis
- Trapezoideus misellus
- Uniandra gratiosus
- Uniandra semmelinki
- Uniandra subcircularis
- Unio turtoni

==== Hyriids ====
- Alathyria jacksoni
- Castalia schombergiana
- Cucumerunio websteri
- Echyridella lucasi
- Prisodon obliquus
- Rhipidodonta hylaea

==== Iridinids ====
- Aspatharia droueti
- Aspatharia marnoi
- Aspatharia subreniformis
- Chambardia trapezia
- Moncetia anceyi
- Mutela bourguignati
- Mutela ovata
- Mutela soleniformis
- Mutela wistarmorrisi

==== Mycetopodids ====
- Anodontites elongatus
- Anodontites trigonus

=== Venerida ===
There are 74 species and three subspecies in the order Veneroida evaluated as data deficient.

==== Dreissenids ====
- Dreissena iconica

==== Sphaeriids ====
Species

- Euglesa gurvichi
- Euglesa mongolica
- Eupera moquiniana
- Eupera triangulum
- Musculium goshaitanensis
- Oval orb shell (Musculium problematicum)
- Musculium quirindi
- Pisidium armillatum
- Pisidium aslini
- Pisidium australiense
- Pisidium carum
- Pisidium chandanbariensis
- Pisidium ellipticum
- Pisidium fistulosum
- Pisidium fultoni
- Pisidium giraudi
- Pisidium globulus
- Pisidium harrisoni
- Pisidium invenustum
- Pisidium kenianum
- Pisidium kosciusko
- Pisidium kuiperi
- Pisidium maculatum
- Pisidium observationis
- Pisidium parvum
- Pisidium plenilunium
- Pisidium stewarti
- Pisidium stoliczkanum
- Pisidium yarkandense
- Pisidium zugmayeri
- Sphaerium aequatoriale
- Sphaerium avanum
- Sphaerium biwaense
- Sphaerium galitzini
- Sphaerium maroccanum
- Sphaerium montanum
- Sphaerium myadii
- Sphaerium regularis
- Sphaerium stuhlmanni

Subspecies

- Musculium hartmanni naivashaens

==== Cyrenids ====
Species

- Batissa inflata
- Batissa similis
- Corbicula amurensis
- Corbicula annadalei
- Corbicula arata
- Corbicula aurea
- Corbicula australis
- Corbicula baudoni
- Corbicula bocourti
- Corbicula castanea
- Corbicula cyreniformis
- Corbicula erosa
- Corbicula finitima
- Corbicula krishnaea
- Corbicula lamarckiana
- Corbicula leviuscula
- Corbicula luteola
- Corbicula lydigiana
- Corbicula messageri
- Corbicula moltkiana
- Corbicula nevelskoyi
- Corbicula occidentiformis
- Corbicula peninsularis
- Corbicula producta
- Corbicula siamensis
- Corbicula sirotskii
- Corbicula sylhetica
- Corbicula tenuis
- Geloina luchuana
- Villorita corbiculoides

Subspecies

- Corbicula fluminalis cunningtoni
- Corbicula fluminalis tanganyicensis

==== Donacids ====
- Egeria kockii
- Egeria schwabi
- Egeria tenuicula

==== Solecurtids ====
- Novaculina siamensis

=== Mytilida ===
- Sinomytilus morrisoni

== Cephalopods ==
There are 291 cephalopod species evaluated as data deficient.

=== Idiosepiida ===
- Idiosepius minimus
- Southern pygmy squid (Idiosepius notoides)
- Northern pygmy squid (Idiosepius paradoxus)
- Idiosepius picteti
- Two-toned pygmy squid (Idiosepius pygmaeus)
- Idiosepius thailandicus

=== Octopuses ===
There are 34 octopus species evaluated as data deficient.

==== Umbrella octopuses ====
- Opisthoteuthis agassizii
- Opisthoteuthis albatrossi
- Opisthoteuthis borealis
- Opisthoteuthis bruuni
- Opisthoteuthis californiana
- Opisthoteuthis depressa
- Opisthoteuthis dongshaensis
- Opisthoteuthis extensa
- Opisthoteuthis grimaldii
- Opisthoteuthis hardyi
- Opisthoteuthis japonica
- Opisthoteuthis medusoides
- Opisthoteuthis persephone
- Opisthoteuthis philipii
- Opisthoteuthis pluto
- Opisthoteuthis robsoni

==== Argonautids ====
- Argonauta cornuta

==== Cirroteuthids ====
- Cirrothauma magna
- Cirrothauma murrayi
- Stauroteuthis gilchristi
- Stauroteuthis syrtensis

==== Grimpoteuthis species ====
- Cryptoteuthis brevibracchiata
- Grimpoteuthis abyssicola
- Grimpoteuthis hippocrepium
- Grimpoteuthis innominata
- Grimpoteuthis meangensis
- Grimpoteuthis megaptera
- Grimpoteuthis pacifica
- Grimpoteuthis plena
- Grimpoteuthis tuftsi
- Grimpoteuthis umbellata
- Grimpoteuthis wuelkeri
- Luteuthis dentatus
- Luteuthis shuishi

=== Sepioloida ===
There are 142 species in Sepioloida evaluated as data deficient.

==== Sepiids ====
- Flamboyant cuttlefish (Metasepia pfefferi)
- Paintpot cuttlefish (Metasepia tullbergi)
- Needle cuttlefish (Sepia aculeata)
- Sepia acuminata
- Sepia adami
- Andrea cuttlefish (Sepia andreana)
- Sepia angulata
- Sepia appellofi
- Arabian cuttlefish (Sepia arabica)
- Sepia aureomaculata
- Stumpy cuttlefish (Sepia bandensis)
- Sepia bartletti
- Sepia bathyalis
- Sepia baxteri
- African cuttlefish (Sepia bertheloti)
- Shortclub cuttlefish (Sepia brevimana)
- Sepia burnupi
- Sepia carinata
- Sepia confusa
- Sepia dollfusi
- Sepia dubia
- Elegant cuttlefish (Sepia elegans)
- Ovalbone cuttlefish (Sepia elliptica)
- Guinean cuttlefish (Sepia elobyana)
- Sepia elongata
- Golden cuttlefish (Sepia esculenta)
- Sepia faurei
- Sepia foliopeza
- Sepia furcata
- Sepia gibba
- Sepia hieronis
- Giant African cuttlefish (Sepia hierredda)
- Sepia hirunda
- Sepia incerta
- Sepia insignis
- Sepia ivanovi
- Sepia joubini
- Sepia kiensis
- Kobi cuttlefish (Sepia kobiensis)
- Broadclub cuttlefish (Sepia latimanus)
- Longarm cuttlefish (Sepia longipes)
- Spider cuttlefish (Sepia lorigera)
- Kisslip cuttlefish (Sepia lycidas)
- Madokai's cuttlefish (Sepia madokai)
- Sepia mascarensis
- Sepia mirabilis
- Frog cuttlefish (Sepia murrayi)
- Pink cuttlefish (Sepia orbignyana)
- Sepia papillata
- Sepia pardex
- Sepia peterseni
- Pharaoh cuttlefish (Sepia pharaonis)
- Sepia plathyconchalis
- Sepia prabahari
- Sepia pulchra
- Sepia ramani
- Curvespine cuttlefish (Sepia recurvirostra)
- Sepia reesi
- Sepia robsoni
- Rosecone cuttlefish (Sepia rozella)
- Broadback cuttlefish (Sepia savignyi)
- Sepia saya
- Sepia sewelli
- Sepia simoniana
- Sepia sokotriensis
- Starry cuttlefish (Sepia stellifera)
- Sepia subplana
- Sepia subtenuipes
- Sepia tala
- Sepia tanybracheia
- Sepia tenuipes
- Sepia thurstoni
- Sepia tokioensis
- Sepia tuberculata
- Sepia vecchioni
- Patchwork cuttlefish (Sepia vermiculata)
- Viet Nam cuttlefish (Sepia vietnamica)
- Voss' cuttlefish (Sepia vossi)
- Whitley's cuttlefish (Sepia whitleyana)
- Zanzibar cuttlefish (Sepia zanzibarica)
- Sepiella cyanea
- Spineless cuttlefish (Sepiella inermis)
- Japanese spineless cuttlefish (Sepiella japonica)
- Sepiella ocellata
- Ornate cuttlefish (Sepiella ornata)
- Web's cuttlefish (Sepiella weberi)

==== Sepiolids ====
- Amphorateuthis alveatus
- Big-eyed bobtail squid (Austrorossia bipapillata)
- Austrorossia enigmatica
- Choneteuthis tongaensis
- Euprymna albatrossae
- Humming-bird bobtail squid (Euprymna berryi)
- Euprymna hoylei
- Euprymna hyllebergi
- Mimka bobtail squid (Euprymna morsei)
- Euprymna penares
- Euprymna phenax
- Euprymna scolopes
- Euprymna stenodactyla
- Southern bobtail squid (Euprymna tasmanica)
- Heteroteuthis dagamensis
- Odd bobtail squid (Heteroteuthis dispar)
- Heteroteuthis hawaiiensis
- Inioteuthis japonica
- Iridoteuthis iris
- Nectoteuthis pourtalesi
- Neorossia leptodons
- Rondeletiola capensis
- Lentil bobtail squid (Rondeletiola minor)
- Rossia brachyura
- Rossia bullisi
- Rossia glaucopis
- Stout bobtail squid (Rossia macrosoma)
- Rossia mollicella
- Rossia pacifica
- Tortuga bobtail squid (Rossia tortugaensis)
- Greater shining bobtail squid (Semirossia equalis)
- Elegant bobtail squid (Sepietta neglecta)
- Common bobtail squid (Sepietta oweniana)
- Sepietta petersi
- Analogous bobtail squid (Sepiola affinis)
- Atlantic bobtail squid (Sepiola atlantica)
- Butterfly bobtail squid (Sepiola birostrata)
- Intermediate bobtail squid (Sepiola intermedia)
- Sepiola knudseni
- Tongue bobtail squid (Sepiola ligulata)
- Sepiola pfefferi
- Robust bobtail squid (Sepiola robusta)
- Dwarf bobtail squid (Sepiola rondeleti)
- Sepiola rossiaeformis
- Sepiola steenstrupiana
- Knobby bobtail squid (Sepiola trirostrata)
- Japanese bobtail squid (Sepiolina nipponensis)
- Leucoptera bobtail squid (Stoloteuthis leucoptera)
- Stoloteuthis maoria
- Stoloteuthis weberi

==== Sepiadariids ====
- Sepiadarium auritum
- Southern bottletail squid (Sepiadarium austrinum)
- Sepiadarium gracilis
- Sepiadarium nipponianum
- Striped pyjama squid (Sepioloidea lineolata)
- Pacific bobtail squid (Sepioloidea pacifica)

=== Oegopsina species ===
There are 104 Oegopsina species evaluated as data deficient.

==== Mastigoteuthidae ====
- Mastigoteuthis agassizii
- Mastigoteuthis atlantica
- Mastigoteuthis cordiformis
- Mastigoteuthis danae
- Mastigoteuthis dentata
- Mastigoteuthis famelica
- Mastigoteuthis glaukopsis
- Mastigoteuthis hjorti
- Mastigoteuthis magna
- Mastigoteuthis microlucens
- Mastigoteuthis psychrophila
- Mastigoteuthis pyrodes
- Mastigoteuthis tyroi

==== Enoploteuthids ====
- Abralia armata
- Abralia astrolineata
- Abralia dubia
- Abralia fasciolata
- Abralia grimpei
- Abralia heminuchalis
- Abralia marisarabica
- Abralia multihamata
- Abralia omiae
- Abralia renschi
- Abralia robsoni
- Abralia siedleckyi
- Abralia spaercki
- Abraliopsis atlantica
- Abraliopsis chuni
- Abraliopsis hoylei
- Abraliopsis tui
- Enoploteuthis chunii
- Enoploteuthis galaxias
- Enoploteuthis magnoceani
- Enoploteuthis octolineata
- Enoploteuthis semilineata

==== Hooked squids ====
- Callimachus rancureli
- Callimachus youngorum
- Kondakovia nigmatullini
- Notonykia africanae
- Notonykia nesisi
- Onychoteuthis aequimanus
- Onychoteuthis banksii
- Onychoteuthis bergii
- Onychoteuthis borealijaponica
- Onychoteuthis compacta
- Onychoteuthis lacrima
- Onychoteuthis meridiopacifica
- Onychoteuthis mollis
- Onychoteuthis prolata
- Onykia aequatorialis
- Onykia carriboea
- Onykia indica
- Onykia robusta

==== Chiroteuthids ====
- Asperoteuthis lui
- Asperoteuthis mangoldae
- Asperoteuthis nesisi
- Planctoteuthis exopthalmica
- Planctoteuthis levimana
- Planctoteuthis lippula
- Planctoteuthis oligobessa

==== Cranchiids ====
- Helicocranchia papillata
- Banded piglet squid (Helicocranchia pfefferi)
- Leachia atlantica
- Leachia cyclura
- Leachia dislocata
- Leachia lemur
- Leachia pacifica
- Liguriella podophthalma
- Megalocranchia fisheri
- Megalocranchia maxima
- Megalocranchia oceanica
- Sandal-eye squid (Sandalops melancholicus)
- Teuthowenia maculata

==== Octopoteuthids ====
- Octopoteuthis danae
- Octopoteuthis deletron
- Octopoteuthis indica
- Octopoteuthis megaptera
- Octopoteuthis nielseni
- Octopoteuthis rugosa
- Octopoteuthis sicula

==== Other Oegopsina species ====
- Brachioteuthis behnii
- Brachioteuthis linkovskyi
- Brachioteuthis riisei
- Humboldt squid (Dosidicus gigas)
- Eogonatus tinro
- Gonatopsis japonicus
- Gonatus oregonensis
- Gonatus ursabrunae
- Histioteuthis berryi
- Histioteuthis celetaria
- Histioteuthis inermis
- Histioteuthis pacifica
- Lycoteuthis springeri
- Magnapinna atlantica
- Magnapinna pacifica
- Narrowteuthis nesisi
- Nematolampas regalis
- Nematolampas venezuelensis
- Nototeuthis dimegacotyle
- Promachoteuthis megaptera
- Promachoteuthis sloani
- Promachoteuthis sulcus
- Pterygioteuthis hoylei
- Pyroteuthis serrata

=== Bathyteuthida ===
- Bathyteuthis bacidifera
- Bathyteuthis berryi
- Chtenopteryx canariensis
- Chtenopteryx sepioloides
- Comb-finned squid (Chtenopteryx sicula)

== See also ==
- Lists of IUCN Red List data deficient species
- List of least concern molluscs
- List of near threatened molluscs
- List of vulnerable molluscs
- List of endangered molluscs
- List of critically endangered molluscs
- List of recently extinct molluscs
