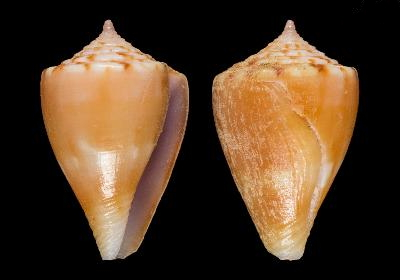
- Shells of Conus troendlei (holotype in MNHN, Paris)

Scientific classification
- Kingdom: Animalia
- Phylum: Mollusca
- Class: Gastropoda
- Subclass: Caenogastropoda
- Order: Neogastropoda
- Superfamily: Conoidea
- Family: Conidae
- Genus: Conus
- Species: C. troendlei

Binomial name
- Conus troendlei Moolenbeek, Zandbergen & Bouchet, 2008

Synonyms
- Conus (Splinoconus) troendlei Moolenbeek, Zandbergen & Bouchet, 2008: accepted, alternate representation; Stellaconus troendlei Moolenbeek, Zandbergen & Bouchet, 2008

= Conus troendlei =

Species of sea snail

Conus troendlei is a species of sea snail, a marine gastropod mollusc in the family Conidae, the cone snails and their allies.

Like all species within the genus Conus, these snails are predatory and venomous. They are capable of stinging humans, therefore live ones should be handled carefully or not at all.

== Description ==
The size of the shell attains 17 mm.

== Distribution ==
This species occurs in the Pacific Ocean off the Marquesas.
