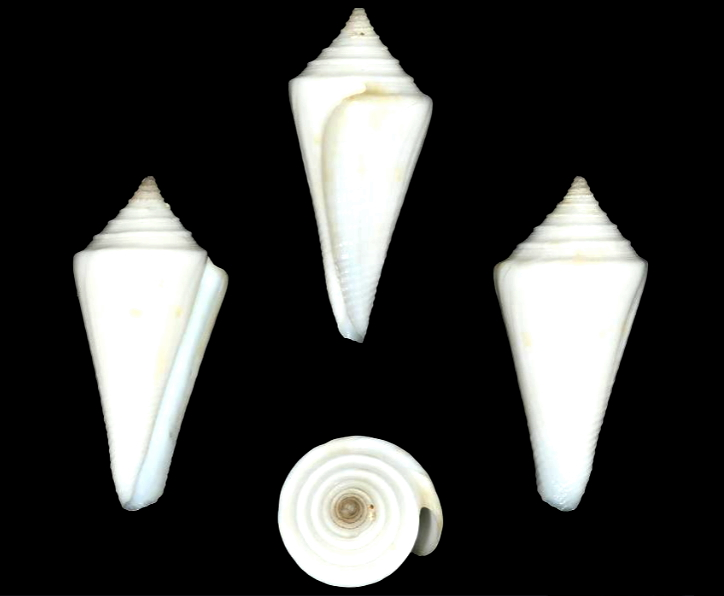
- Shell and protoconch of Conus leekremeri (specimen at the Smithsonian Institution)

Conservation status
- Data Deficient (IUCN 3.1)

Scientific classification
- Kingdom: Animalia
- Phylum: Mollusca
- Class: Gastropoda
- Subclass: Caenogastropoda
- Order: Neogastropoda
- Superfamily: Conoidea
- Family: Conidae
- Genus: Conus
- Species: C. leekremeri

Binomial name
- Conus leekremeri Petuch, 1987

Synonyms
- Conasprelloides leekremeri (Petuch, 1987); Conus (Dauciconus) leekremeri Petuch, 1987 · accepted, alternate representation

= Conus leekremeri =

Species of sea snail

Conus leekremeri is a species of sea snail, a marine gastropod mollusk in the family Conidae, the cone snails and their allies.

Like all species within the genus Conus, these snails are predatory and venomous. They are capable of stinging humans, therefore live ones should be handled carefully or not at all.

== Description ==
Original description: "Shell thin, elongated, with high widely scalariform spire; body whorl shiny, highly polished, ornamented with numerous low, rounded spiral cords; cords become large and more numerous around the anterior end; spire whorls ornamented with 4 large, spiral threads; spire whorls concave, producing canaliculated whorls; canaliculate spire edged with low, rounded carina along edge of shoulder; carina follows edge of suture on canaliculate spire whorls; sides of body whorl distinctly concave and indented, producing an emaciated, waisted appearance; aperture long and very narrow; body whorl, spire, and interior of aperture pure white; periostracum thin, transparent yellow."

The maximum recorded shell length is 30 mm.

== Distribution ==
Locus typicus: "Southern coast of Grand Bahama Island."

This marine species occurs off the Bahamas.

== Habitat ==
Minimum recorded depth is 240 m. Maximum recorded depth is 240 m.
