= Conus moylani =

Conservation status
- Data Deficient (IUCN 3.1)

Scientific classification
- Kingdom: Animalia
- Phylum: Mollusca
- Class: Gastropoda
- Subclass: Caenogastropoda
- Order: Neogastropoda
- Superfamily: Conoidea
- Family: Conidae
- Genus: Conus
- Species: C. moylani

Binomial name
- Conus moylani Delsaerdt, 2000

Synonyms
- Kioconus (Ongoconus) moylani (Delsaerdt, 2000)

Species of gastropod

Conus moylani is a species of sea snail, a marine gastropod mollusk, in the family Conidae, the cone snails and their allies.

== Distribution ==
This species occurs off the Solomon Islands.
