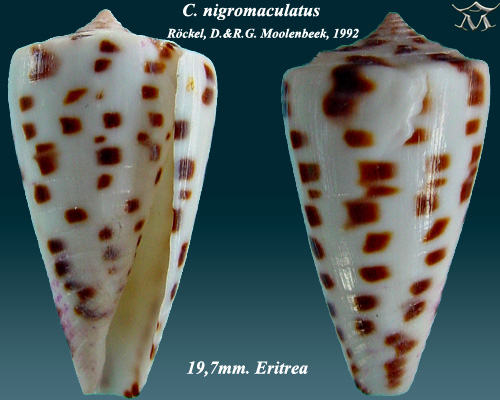
- Apertural and abapertural views of shell of Conus nigromaculatus Röckel, D. & R.G. Moolenbeek, 1992

Conservation status
- Data Deficient (IUCN 3.1)

Scientific classification
- Kingdom: Animalia
- Phylum: Mollusca
- Class: Gastropoda
- Subclass: Caenogastropoda
- Order: Neogastropoda
- Superfamily: Conoidea
- Family: Conidae
- Genus: Conus
- Species: C. nigromaculatus

Binomial name
- Conus nigromaculatus Röckel & Moolenbeek, 1992

Synonyms
- Asprella nigromaculata (Röckel & Moolenbeek, 1992); Conus (Pionoconus) nigromaculatus Röckel & Moolenbeek, 1992· accepted, alternate representation; Pionoconus nigromaculatus (Röckel & Moolenbeek, 1992)

= Conus nigromaculatus =

Species of sea snail

Conus nigromaculatus is a species of sea snail, a marine gastropod mollusk in the family Conidae, the cone snails and their allies.

Like all species within the genus Conus, these snails are predatory and venomous. They are capable of stinging humans, therefore live ones should be handled carefully or not at all.

== Description ==
The size of the shell varies between 20 mm and 46 mm.

== Distribution ==
This marine species occurs in the Red Sea (Dahlak Archipelago) and off Eritrea.
