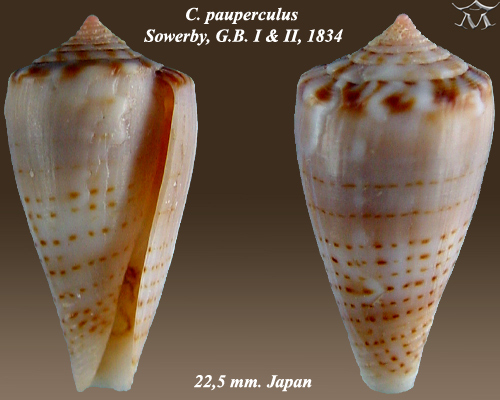
- Apertural and abapertural views of shell of Conus pauperculus Sowerby, G.B. I, 1834

Scientific classification
- Kingdom: Animalia
- Phylum: Mollusca
- Class: Gastropoda
- Subclass: Caenogastropoda
- Order: Neogastropoda
- Superfamily: Conoidea
- Family: Conidae
- Genus: Conus
- Species: C. pauperculus

Binomial name
- Conus pauperculus G. B. Sowerby I, 1834

Synonyms
- Conus (Splinoconus) pauperculus G. B. Sowerby I, 1834 · accepted, alternate representation; Nitidoconus pauperculus (G. B. Sowerby I, 1834); Stephanoconus pauperculus (G. B. Sowerby I, 1834)

= Conus pauperculus =

Species of sea snail

Conus pauperculus is a species of sea snail, a marine gastropod mollusk in the family Conidae, the cone snails and their allies.

Like all species within the genus Conus, these snails are predatory and venomous. They are capable of stinging humans, therefore live ones should be handled carefully or not at all.

== Description ==
The size of the shell varies between 20 mm and 40 mm. The thin shell is narrow. Its color is olivaceous, with a flesh-colored central band, and numerous revolving series of small chestnut spots.

== Distribution ==
This marine species occurs off Okinawa, Japan
