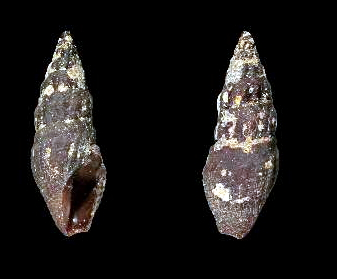
- Shell of Crassispira sacerdotalis (paratype in MNHN, Paris)

Conservation status
- Data Deficient (IUCN 2.3)

Scientific classification
- Kingdom: Animalia
- Phylum: Mollusca
- Class: Gastropoda
- Subclass: Caenogastropoda
- Order: Neogastropoda
- Superfamily: Conoidea
- Family: Pseudomelatomidae
- Genus: Crassispira
- Species: C. sacerdotalis

Binomial name
- Crassispira sacerdotalis Rolan & Fernandes, 1992

= Crassispira sacerdotalis =

Species of gastropod

Crassispira sacerdotalis is a rare species of small predatory sea snail, a marine gastropod mollusk in the family Pseudomelatomidae, the turrids and allies.

== Description ==
The length of the shell attains 8 mm.

== Distribution ==
This species is endemic to São Tomé and Príncipe.
