= Bulimulus trogonius =

Conservation status
- Data Deficient (IUCN 3.1)

Scientific classification
- Kingdom: Animalia
- Phylum: Mollusca
- Class: Gastropoda
- Order: Stylommatophora
- Family: Bulimulidae
- Genus: Bulimulus
- Species: B. trogonius

Binomial name
- Bulimulus trogonius (Dall, 1917)

Synonyms
- Naesiotus trogonius

Species of gastropod

Bulimulus trogonius is a species of tropical air-breathing land snail, a pulmonate gastropod mollusk in the subfamily Bulimulinae.

This species is endemic to Ecuador. It is threatened by habitat loss.
