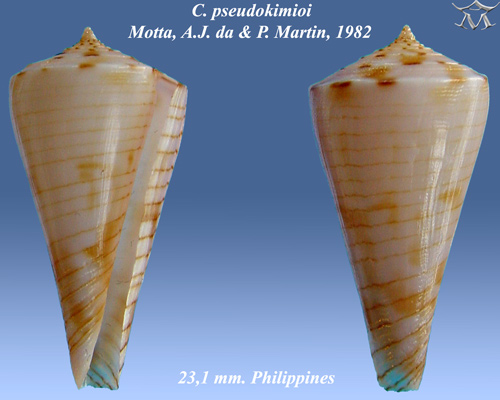
- Apertural and abapertural views of shell of Conasprella pseudokimioi (Motta, A.J. da & P. Martin, 1982)
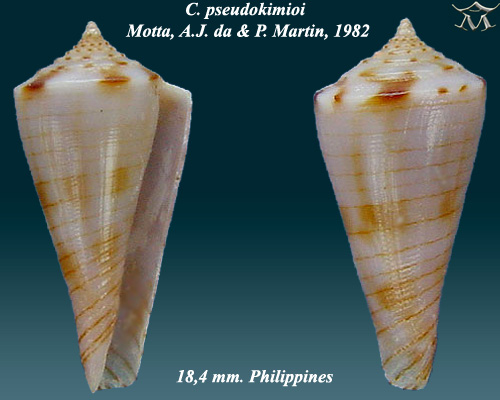

Conservation status
- Data Deficient (IUCN 3.1)

Scientific classification
- Kingdom: Animalia
- Phylum: Mollusca
- Class: Gastropoda
- Subclass: Caenogastropoda
- Order: Neogastropoda
- Superfamily: Conoidea
- Family: Conidae
- Genus: Conasprella
- Species: C. pseudokimioi

Binomial name
- Conasprella pseudokimioi (da Motta & Martin, 1982)

Synonyms
- Asprella pseudokimioi (da Motta & Martin, 1982); Conasprella (Boucheticonus) pseudokimioi (da Motta & Martin, 1982) · accepted, alternate representation; Continuconus pseudokimioi (da Motta & Martin, 1982); Conus pseudokimioi da Motta & Martin, 1982 (original combination)

= Conasprella pseudokimioi =

Species of gastropod

Conasprella pseudokimioi is a species of sea snail, a marine gastropod mollusk in the family Conidae, the cone snails and their allies.

Like all species within the genus Conasprella, these snails are predatory and venomous. They are capable of stinging humans, therefore live ones should be handled carefully or not at all.

== Description ==
The size of the shell varies between 16 mm and 26 mm.

== Distribution ==
This marine species occurs off Mindanao, the Philippines.
