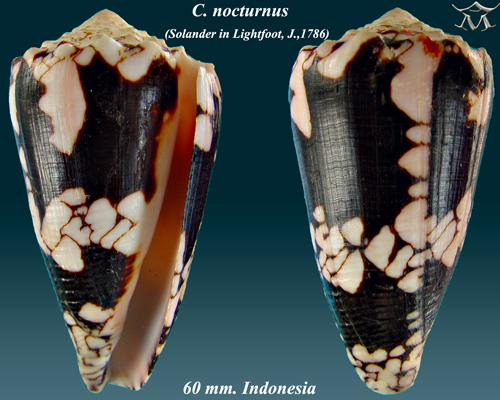
- Apertural and abapertural views of shell of Conus nocturnus (Solander in Lightfoot, J., 1786)
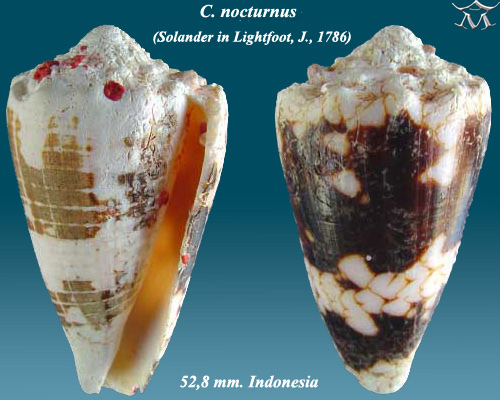

Scientific classification
- Kingdom: Animalia
- Phylum: Mollusca
- Class: Gastropoda
- Subclass: Caenogastropoda
- Order: Neogastropoda
- Superfamily: Conoidea
- Family: Conidae
- Genus: Conus
- Species: C. nocturnus

Binomial name
- Conus nocturnus sensu Lightfoot, 1786

Synonyms
- Conus (Conus) nocturnus [Lightfoot], 1786 · accepted, alternate representation; Conus deburghiae G. B. Sowerby II, 1857; Conus nocturnus Hwass in Bruguière, 1792 (synonym and homonym of Conus nocturnus [Lightfoot], 1786)

= Conus nocturnus =

Species of sea snail

Conus nocturnus is a species of sea snail, a marine gastropod mollusk in the family Conidae, the cone snails and their allies.

Like all species within the genus Conus, these snails are predatory and venomous. They are capable of stinging humans, therefore live ones should be handled carefully or not at all.

== Description ==
The size of the shell varies between 45 and 86 mm (1.8 and 3.4 in). The pattern of the markings are essentially the same as in Conus marmoreus, but the chocolate-color coalesces into two broad irregular bands within which the triangular white spots appear only occasionally. In Conus deburghiae the surface is sometimes granular in the revolving lines, and the nodules are compressed.

== Distribution ==
This marine species occurs off Madagascar, off Mauritius, Sri Lanka, the Moluccas and New Guinea.
