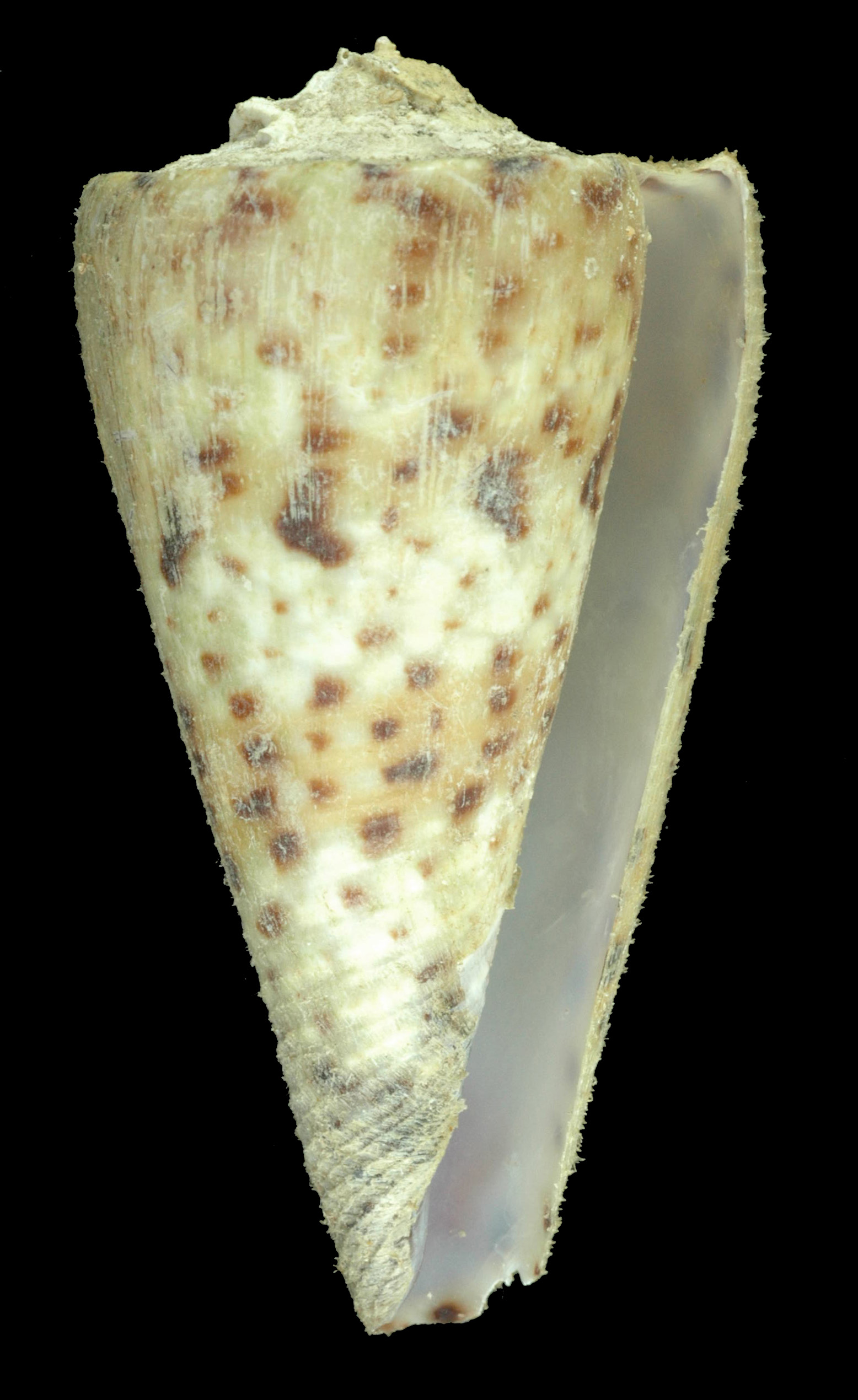
- Shell of Conus moncuri (specimen at MNHN, Paris)

Scientific classification
- Kingdom: Animalia
- Phylum: Mollusca
- Class: Gastropoda
- Subclass: Caenogastropoda
- Order: Neogastropoda
- Superfamily: Conoidea
- Family: Conidae
- Genus: Conus
- Species: C. moncuri

Binomial name
- Conus moncuri Filmer, 2005

Synonyms
- Conus (Elisaconus) moncuri Filmer, 2005 · accepted, alternate representation; Conus (Embrikena) moncuri Filmer, 2005; Elisaconus moncuri (Filmer, 2005); Strategoconus litteratus var. moncuri (Filmer, 2005)

= Conus moncuri =

Species of sea snail

Conus moncuri is a species of sea snail, a marine gastropod mollusk in the family Conidae, the cone snails, cone shells or cones.

These snails are predatory and venomous. They are capable of stinging humans.

== Description ==
The size of the shell varies between 98 mm and 181 mm.

== Distribution ==
This marine species occurs off the Philippines and Papua New Guinea.
