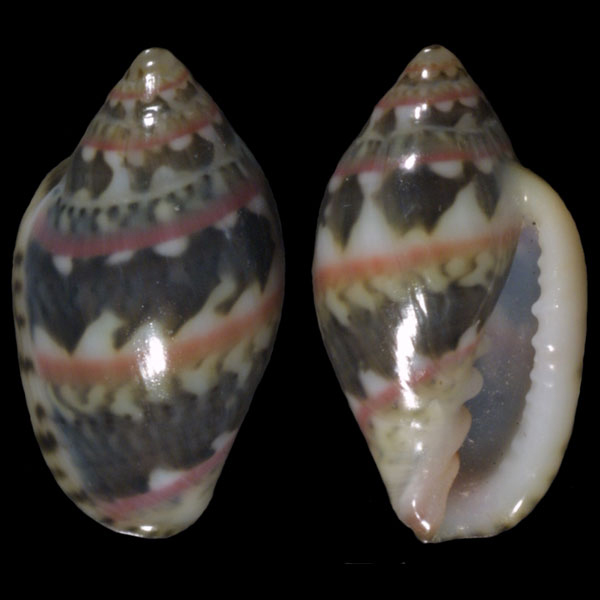
- Two views of a shell of Marginella liparozona

Conservation status
- Data Deficient (IUCN 2.3)

Scientific classification
- Kingdom: Animalia
- Phylum: Mollusca
- Class: Gastropoda
- Subclass: Caenogastropoda
- Order: Neogastropoda
- Family: Marginellidae
- Genus: Marginella
- Species: M. liparozona

Binomial name
- Marginella liparozona Tomlin & Shackleford, 1913

= Marginella liparozona =

Species of gastropod

Marginella liparozona is a species of colorful small sea snail, a marine gastropod mollusk in the Marginellidae family.

The species is endemic to São Tomé and Príncipe.
