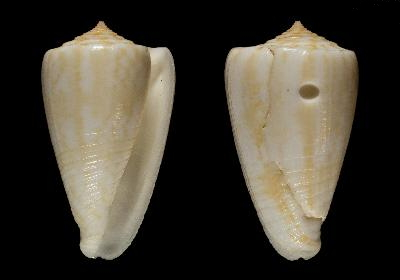
- Shell of Conus evansi (holotype at MNHN, Paris)

Conservation status
- Data Deficient (IUCN 3.1)

Scientific classification
- Kingdom: Animalia
- Phylum: Mollusca
- Class: Gastropoda
- Subclass: Caenogastropoda
- Order: Neogastropoda
- Superfamily: Conoidea
- Family: Conidae
- Genus: Conus
- Species: C. evansi

Binomial name
- Conus evansi Bondarev, 2001

Synonyms
- Conus (Phasmoconus) evansi Bondarev, 2001 · accepted, alternate representation; Graphiconus evansi (Bondarev, 2001)

= Conus evansi =

Species of sea snail

Conus evansi is a species of sea snail, a marine gastropod mollusk in the family Conidae, the cone snails, cone shells or cones.

These snails are predatory and venomous. They are capable of stinging humans.

== Description ==
The size of the shell attains 41 mm.

== Distribution ==
This marine species of cone snail occurs in the Red Sea.
