= Rectidens sumatrensis =

Conservation status
- Data Deficient (IUCN 3.1)

Scientific classification
- Kingdom: Animalia
- Phylum: Mollusca
- Class: Bivalvia
- Order: Unionida
- Family: Unionidae
- Genus: Rectidens
- Species: R. sumatrensis

Binomial name
- Rectidens sumatrensis (Dunker, 1852)

Synonyms
- List: Unio sumatrensis Dunker, 1852 DC; Microcondylaea gracilis Strubell, 1897; Rectidens sumatrensis gracilis (Strubell, 1897); Rectidens lingulatus (Drouët & Chaper, 1892); Unio lingulatus Drouët & Chaper, 1892; Unio sumatrensis Haas, 1969; Rectidens prestoni C. T. Simpson, 1914; Rectidens sumatrensis pressirostris (E. von Martens, 1900); Unio pressirostris E. von Martens, 1900; Unio perakensis Preston, 1912; Unio palembangensis pahumbaensis Martens, 1900; Unio palembangensis var. pahumbaensis E. von Martens, 1900; Unio pahangensis E. A. Smith, 1899; Unio palembangensis Strubell, 1897; Unio prolongatus Drouët, 1894; Unio perakensis de Morgan, 1886

Species of freshwater mussel

Rectidens sumatrensis is a freshwater bivalve that belongs to the order Unionida and the family Unionidae. It is one of five native freshwater mussel species reported in northern Borneo. Its known distribution includes Peninsular Malaysia, northern Borneo, and Indonesia. There is currently limited scientific research that is solely focused on this species. Rectidens sumatrensis is currently listed as an IUCN data-deficient species.

== Etymology ==
The genus comes from the latin words recti and dens, which translate to "straight tooth", referring to the teeth along the hinge of the mussel shell that aid the two valves in fitting together. The species epithet sumatrensis refers to Sumatra, Indonesia, reflecting the species' historical geographic origin.

== Description ==
The species has an elongated shell with parallel dorsal and ventral margins. Well-developed posterior ridge. Brown to blackish coloration, with a double-looped umbonal sculpture and a long pseudo cardinal and lateral hinge teeth.

The Malaysian National Red List identifies the species as occurring in relatively unpolluted river environments with stable substrates and suitable water chemistry. Its sensitivity to eutrophication and other environmental changes suggests that it may be vulnerable to disturbances that affect freshwater ecosystem conditions.

== Taxonomy ==
Rectidens sumatrensis was originally discovered by Dunker in 1852. Its original locality was recorded as Danau Luar, Sumatra. Its classification has changed as researchers have examined additional specimens and compared physical and genetic characteristics. Historically, the genus Rectidens was also considered to contain two separate species: R. sumatrensis, associated with Sumatra, Java, and Peninsular Malaysia, and the Rectidens lingulatus, associated with Borneo.

However, molecular analyses found that specimens from Peninsular Malaysia and Sarawak in Borneo represented the same species. As a result, R. lingulatas was treated as a synonym of R. sumatrensis. This expanded the recognized distribution of the species, and demonstrated that geographic separation and shell differences were not sufficient to establish two distinct species.

Pfeiffer et al. (2021) subsequently conducted a broader taxonomic revision of Southeast Asian freshwater mussels. Their work recognized R. sumatrensis as the single valid species within the genus Rectidens at that time.

== Distribution and Habitat ==
This map shows by color which Zieritz study data came from using the in-text citation formula in the legend, followed by the year the area was sampled (usually different than the year data was published). If sampling date is unknown, there is no underscore. The red hatched area over Java represents that study's findings that the species was found absent from Java as of 2022. The circle size corresponds to the number observational sites and/or geographic extent of observation of individuals of the species. This map is a synthesis of only data relating to R. sumatrensis from these studies.

R. sumatrensis has been found in Sumatra, Java, Borneo, and the Malay Peninsula. It is still found in Sumatra, Borneo, and the Malay Peninsula, but has not been observed in Java in modern studies. Additionally, human activity in the past 50+ years has had a significant impact on their distribution within their native ranges where they can still be found. Populations in Borneo have faced the least substantial change from historical range according to 2016 sampling data. At the time of this sampling data, the species was only found in one river basin in Peninsular and 4 basins in the northern Borneo regions of Malaysia.

In a study of freshwater mussels in Peninsular Malaysia, R. sumatrensis was found only in one site in the Perak River region. Historically it was found both in the Perak and Pahang regions in multiple basins, indicating a severe constriction of their range on the peninsula.

R. sumatrensis populations in northwestern Borneo appeared to be relatively stable and were found in several testing locations. That being said, their range in the area has shifted compared to historical records (see Figure 1 in Zieritz et al., 2024). Additionally, there has been a decrease in the number of records from 22 to 15 from historical records to data from 2016 respectively.

==== Habitat ====
Through studies of the habitat in which R. sumatrensis is found, it has been established that they prefer woodland areas and wide rivers. R. sumatrensis shows a preference for a pH of 6.5-7.3 (relatively high), high organic content, and a high concentration of silicate. They appear to be sensitive to acidification and eutrophication, as well as high levels of suspended soils and phosphorus.

One specific study investigating the Sarawak region of Malaysian Borneo found more specific habitat preferences for R. sumatrensis populations in the area. All populations in study Zieritz et al., 2018 were found only in rivers during 2016 summer sampling. The same research, through presence/absence geographic and statistical modeling, found that 17 predictor variables could be used to reasonably predict the presence of R. sumatrensis in rivers. The predictors include 7 indicators of water quality, 3 climatic indicators, 3 landscape indicators, and 4 human-related indicators. Probability of the presence of R. sumatrensis is increased by low concentrations of chlorphyll a, total dissolved solids, total ammoniacal nitrogen, and pH in water as well as high precipitation and organic content of soils. Human impacts and activities such as presence of human populations, proximity of habitat to transportation networks like roads, and human (anthropogenic) land cover use decrease the probability of R. sumatrensis. Conservation implications of these findings are discussed in the "Conservation" section.

== Conservation ==
The IUCN SSC Mollusc Specialist Group last assessed R. sumatrensis on July 22, 2011 and categorized the species as “Data Deficient” for conservation status, meaning that there was not adequate data available at the time of assessment to fully assess against conservation criteria. It should also be noted that R. sumatrensis is also noted in the National Red List of Freshwater Mussels in Malaysia, declared locally NT (near threatened) as of 2018, citing that due to the local extinction of the species in the Pahang basin, the species is close to meeting criteria to classify it as threatened in Malaysia. The handbook cites the 2016 and 2018 Zieritz publications for species distribution data. There are no other local conservation statuses or handbooks related to R. sumatrensis.
