= Awalycaeus akiratadai =

Conservation status
- Data Deficient (IUCN 2.3)

Scientific classification
- Kingdom: Animalia
- Phylum: Mollusca
- Class: Gastropoda
- Subclass: Caenogastropoda
- Order: Architaenioglossa
- Family: Alycaeidae
- Genus: Dicharax
- Species: D. akiratadai

Binomial name
- Dicharax akiratadai Minato, 1982

Species of gastropod

Awalycaeus akiratadai is a species of land snail, a terrestrial gastropod mollusk in the family Cyclophoridae.

This species is endemic to Japan.
