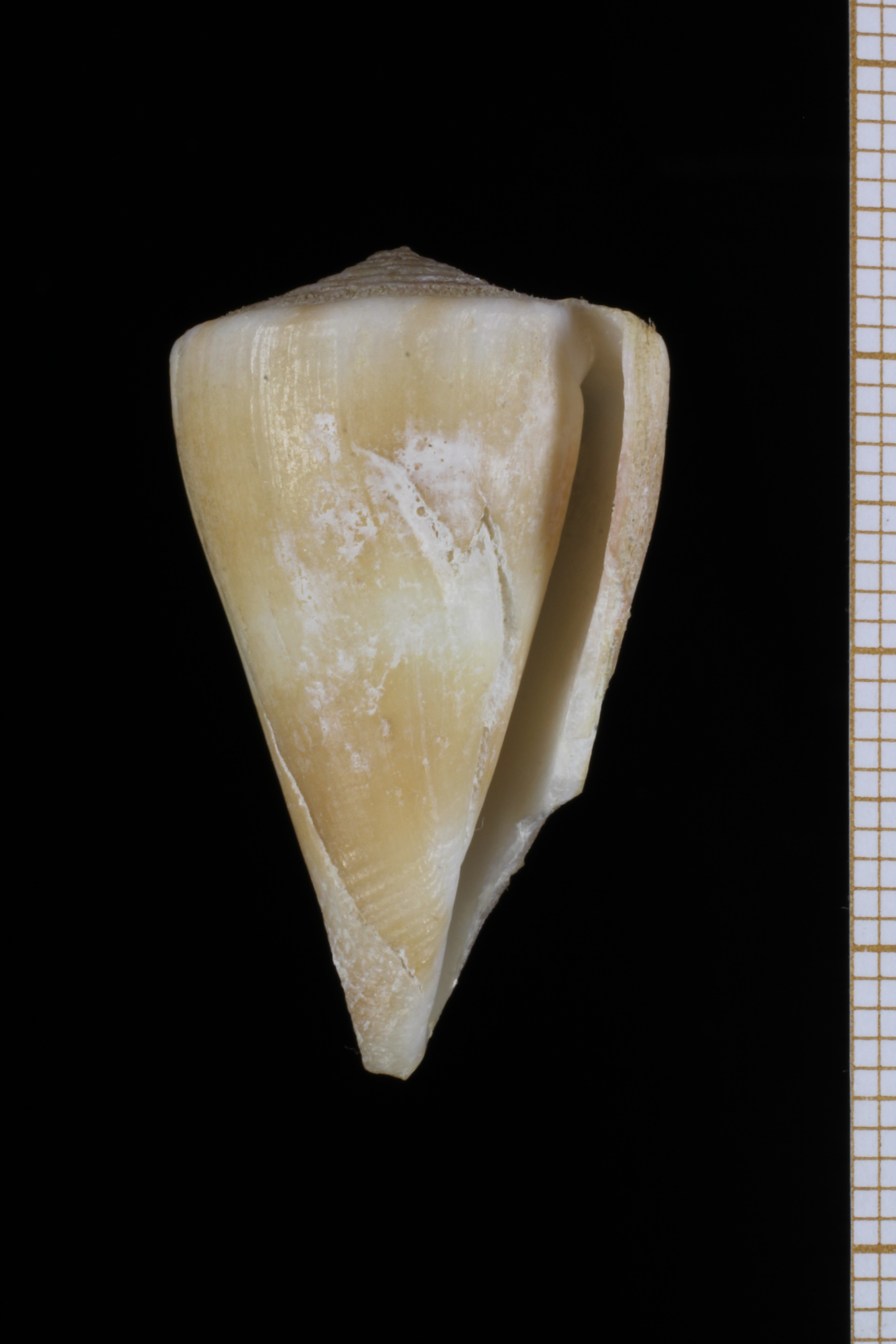
- Shell of Conus bondarevi (specimen at MNHN, Paris)

Conservation status
- Data Deficient (IUCN 3.1)

Scientific classification
- Kingdom: Animalia
- Phylum: Mollusca
- Class: Gastropoda
- Subclass: Caenogastropoda
- Order: Neogastropoda
- Superfamily: Conoidea
- Family: Conidae
- Genus: Conus
- Species: C. bondarevi

Binomial name
- Conus bondarevi Röckel & G. Raybaudi Massilia, 1992

Synonyms
- Conus (Splinoconus) bondarevi Röckel & G. Raybaudi Massilia, 1992 accepted, alternate representation; Stellaconus bondarevi (Röckel & G. Raybaudi Massilia, 1992)

= Conus bondarevi =

Species of sea snail

Conus bondarevi is a species of sea snail, a marine gastropod mollusk in the family Conidae, the cone snails and their allies.

Like all species within the genus Conus, these snails are predatory and venomous. They are capable of stinging humans, therefore live ones should be handled carefully or not at all.

== Description ==
The size of the shell varies between 29 mm and 43 mm.

== Distribution ==
This marine species occurs off Northern Somalia and in the Mozambique Channel .
