= Conus ciderryi =

Conservation status
- Data Deficient (IUCN 3.1)

Scientific classification
- Kingdom: Animalia
- Phylum: Mollusca
- Class: Gastropoda
- Subclass: Caenogastropoda
- Order: Neogastropoda
- Superfamily: Conoidea
- Family: Conidae
- Genus: Conus
- Species: C. ciderryi

Binomial name
- Conus ciderryi da Motta, 1985

Synonyms
- Asprella ciderryi (da Motta, 1985); Conus (Phasmoconus) ciderryi da Motta, 1985 accepted, alternate representation; Phasmoconus ciderryi (da Motta, 1985) ·

Species of sea snail

Conus ciderryi is a species of sea snail, a marine gastropod mollusk in the family Conidae, the cone snails. Like all in their genus, these snails are predatory, venomous and have stingers.

== Description ==
The size of the shell varies between 25 mm and 46 mm.

== Distribution ==
This marine species occurs off Taiwan, Vietnam, the Philippines and the Amami Islands
