= Conus hamamotoi =

Scientific classification
- Kingdom: Animalia
- Phylum: Mollusca
- Class: Gastropoda
- Subclass: Caenogastropoda
- Order: Neogastropoda
- Superfamily: Conoidea
- Family: Conidae
- Genus: Conus
- Species: C. hamamotoi

Binomial name
- Conus hamamotoi Yoshiba & Koyama, 1984

Synonyms
- Conus (Splinoconus) hamamotoi Yoshiba & Koyama, 1984 · accepted, alternate representation; Nitidoconus hamamotoi (Yoshiba & Koyoma, 1984); Rolaniconus hamamotoi (Yoshiba & Koyoma, 1984)

Species of sea snail

Conus hamamotoi is a species of sea snail, a marine gastropod mollusk in the family Conidae, the cone snails and their allies.

Like all species within the genus Conus, these snails are predatory and venomous. They are capable of stinging humans, therefore live ones should be handled carefully or not at all.

== Description ==
The size of the shell varies between 18 mm and 24 mm.

== Distribution ==
This marine species occurs off Japan, New Caledonia and in the Coral Sea.
