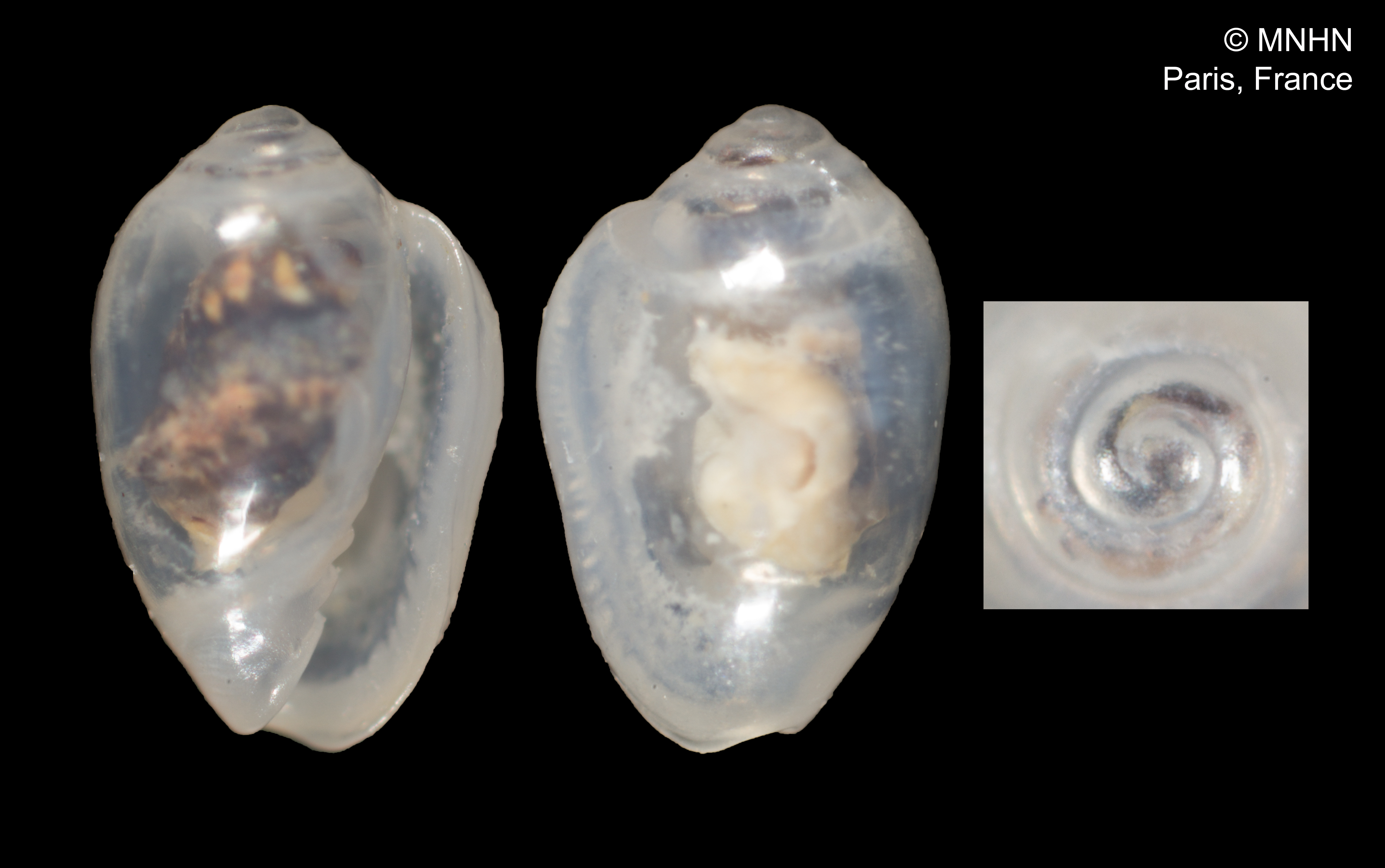

Scientific classification
- Kingdom: Animalia
- Phylum: Mollusca
- Class: Gastropoda
- Subclass: Caenogastropoda
- Order: Neogastropoda
- Family: Cystiscidae
- Subfamily: Cystiscinae
- Genus: Gibberula
- Species: G. punctillum

Binomial name
- Gibberula punctillum Gofas & Fernandes, 1988

= Gibberula punctillum =

Species of gastropod

Gibberula punctillum is a species of small sea snail, a marine gastropod mollusk in the family Cystiscidae family,

== Distribution ==
This marine species is endemic to São Tomé and Príncipe.
