= Dicharax placeonovitas =

Conservation status
- Data Deficient (IUCN 2.3)

Scientific classification
- Kingdom: Animalia
- Phylum: Mollusca
- Class: Gastropoda
- Subclass: Caenogastropoda
- Order: Architaenioglossa
- Family: Alycaeidae
- Genus: Dicharax
- Species: D. placeonovitas

Binomial name
- Dicharax placeonovitas (Minato, 1981)

Synonyms
- List: Chamalycaeus (Cipangocharax) placenovitas (Minato, 1981); Chamalycaeus placenovitas (Minato, 1981); Cipangocharax placenovitas Minato, 1981

Species of gastropod

Dicharax placeonovitas is a species of small tropical land snail with an operculum, a terrestrial gastropod mollusk in the family Alycaeidae.

This species is endemic to the limestone region of Kōchi Prefecture, Japan.
