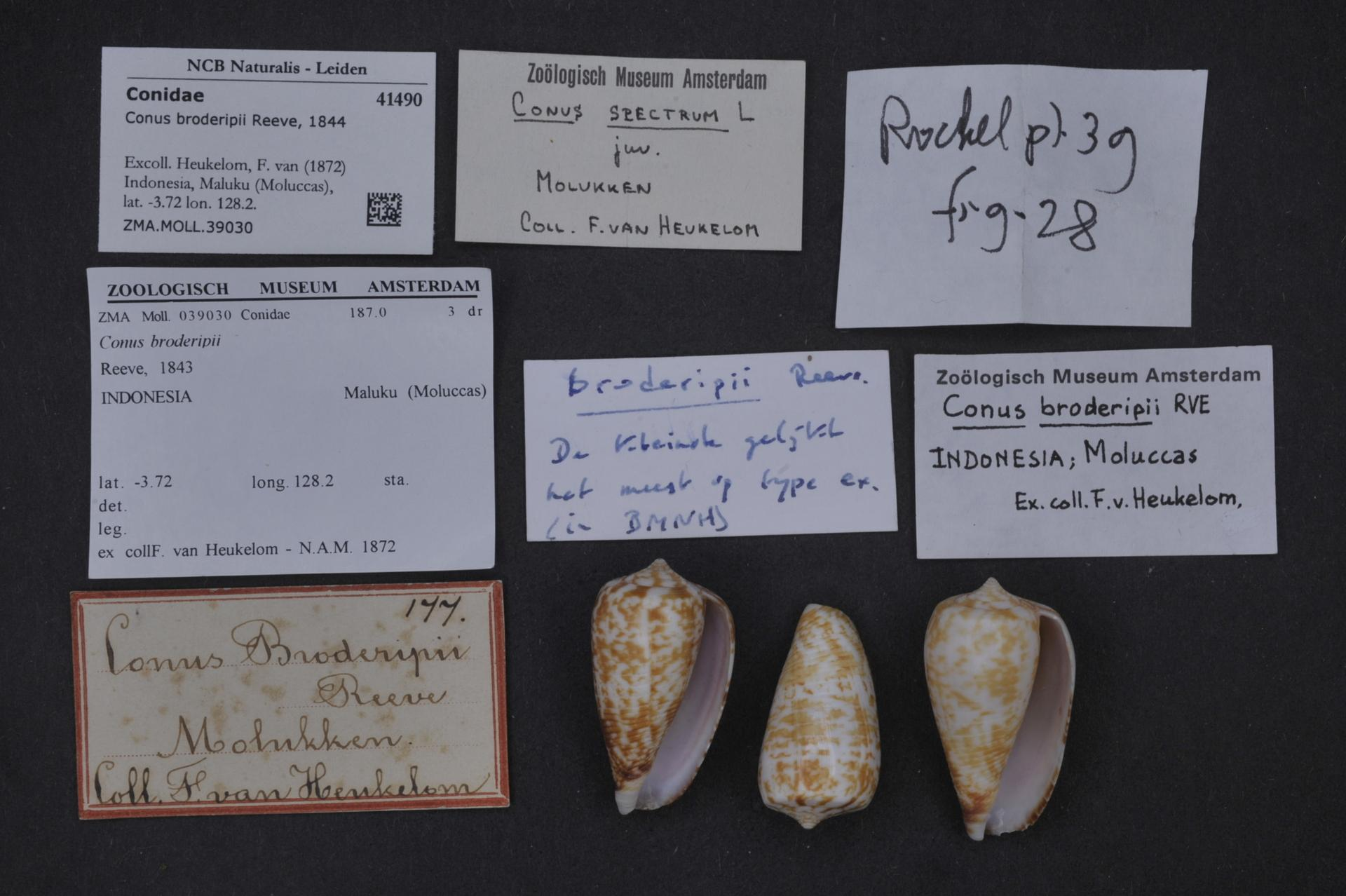

Conservation status
- Data Deficient (IUCN 3.1)

Scientific classification
- Kingdom: Animalia
- Phylum: Mollusca
- Class: Gastropoda
- Subclass: Caenogastropoda
- Order: Neogastropoda
- Superfamily: Conoidea
- Family: Conidae
- Genus: Conus
- Species: C. broderipii

Binomial name
- Conus broderipii Reeve, 1844

Synonyms
- Asprella broderipii (Reeve, 1844); Conus (Phasmoconus) broderipii Reeve, 1844 · accepted, alternate representation; Graphiconus broderipii (Reeve, 1844)

= Conus broderipii =

Species of sea snail

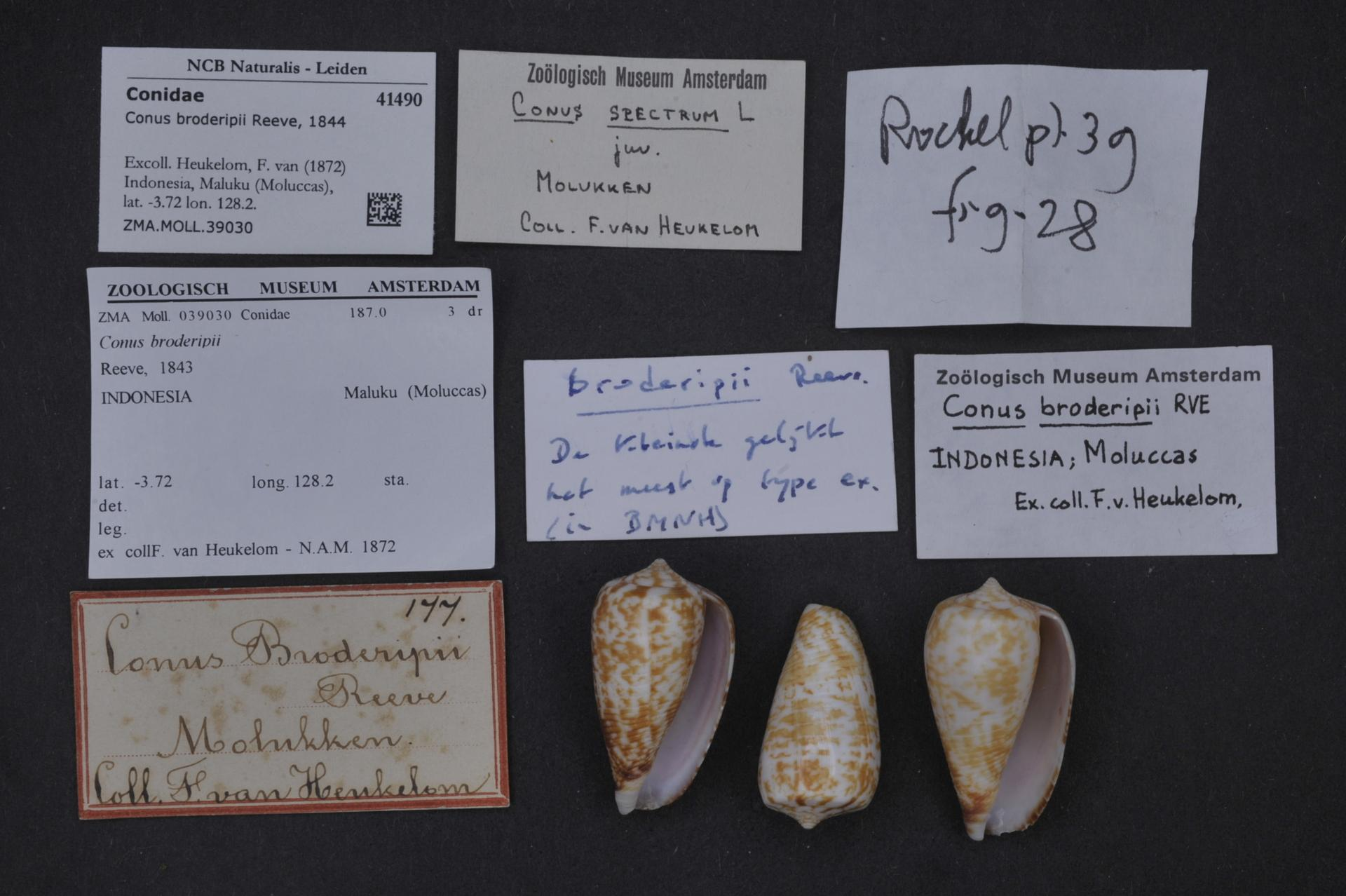

Conus broderipii is a species of sea snail, a marine gastropod mollusk in the family Conidae, the cone snails and their allies.

Like all species within the genus Conus, these snails are predatory and venomous. They are capable of stinging humans, therefore live ones should be handled carefully or not at all.

== Description ==
The size of the shell varies between 25 mm and 50 mm. They use a specialized harpoon-like tooth to inject venom into prey like worms, mollusks, or small fish. Different species have different venom strengths.

The shell is usually elongated and patterned. Coloration can vary between individuals.

== Distribution ==
This marine species occurs in the Indian Ocean off Madagascar; off the Moluccas, Indonesia and in the Sulu Sea, Philippines.
