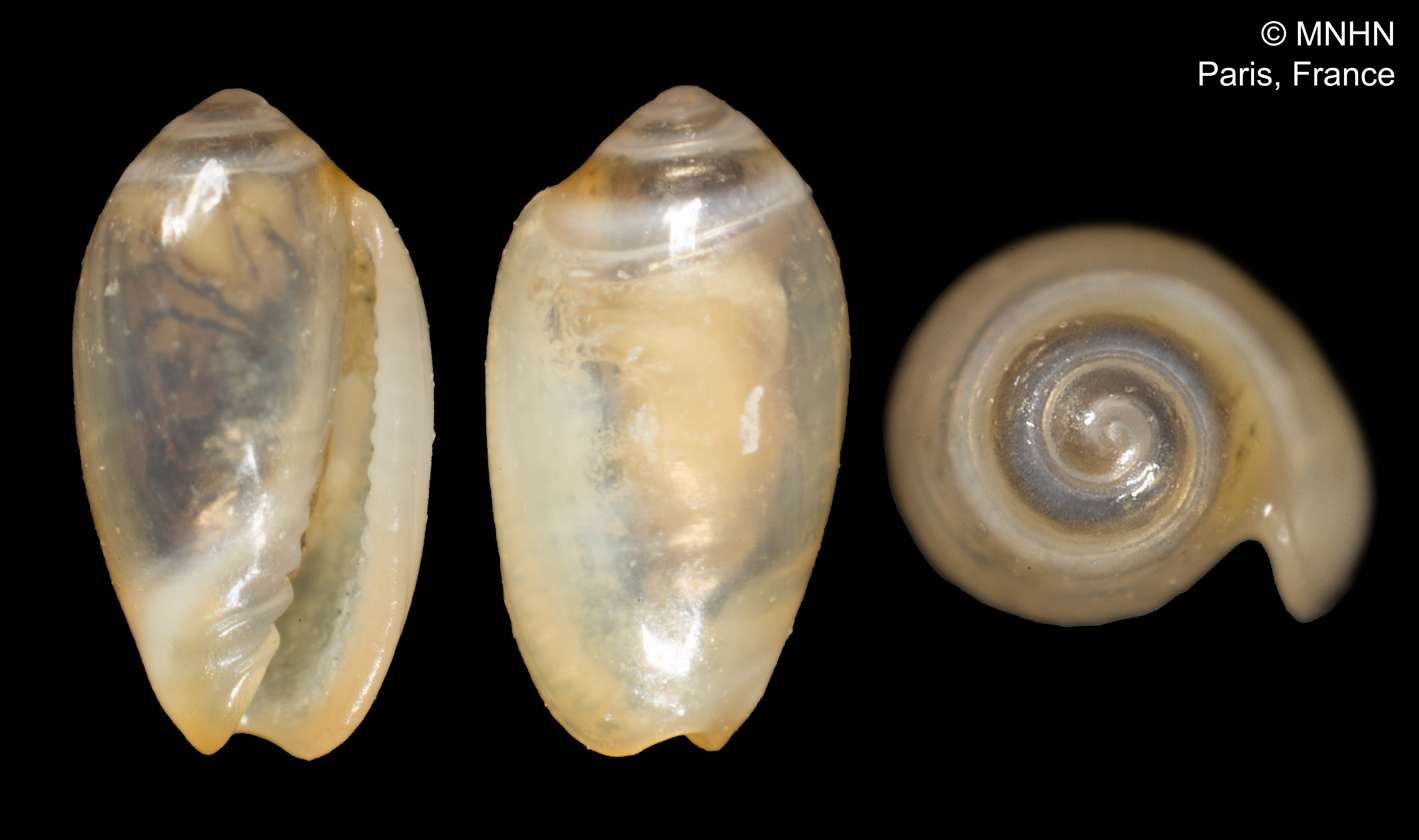

Conservation status
- Data Deficient (IUCN 2.3)

Scientific classification
- Kingdom: Animalia
- Phylum: Mollusca
- Class: Gastropoda
- Subclass: Caenogastropoda
- Order: Neogastropoda
- Family: Cystiscidae
- Subfamily: Cystiscinae
- Genus: Gibberula
- Species: G. cucullata

Binomial name
- Gibberula cucullata Gofas & Fernandes, 1988

= Gibberula cucullata =

Species of gastropod

Gibberula cucullata is a species of small sea snail, a marine gastropod mollusk in the family Cystiscidae, previously placed in the family Marginellidae.

== Distribution ==
The species is endemic to São Tomé and Príncipe.
