= Mastigoteuthis pyrodes =

Scientific classification
- Domain: Eukaryota
- Kingdom: Animalia
- Phylum: Mollusca
- Class: Cephalopoda
- Order: Oegopsida
- Family: Mastigoteuthidae
- Genus: Mastigoteuthis
- Species: M. pyrodes

Binomial name
- Mastigoteuthis pyrodes Young, 1972

Species of squid

Mastigoteuthis pyrodes is a species of whip-lash squid.
