= Conus kerstitchi =

Conservation status
- Data Deficient (IUCN 3.1)

Scientific classification
- Kingdom: Animalia
- Phylum: Mollusca
- Class: Gastropoda
- Subclass: Caenogastropoda
- Order: Neogastropoda
- Superfamily: Conoidea
- Family: Conidae
- Genus: Conus
- Species: C. kerstitchi

Binomial name
- Conus kerstitchi Walls, 1978

Synonyms
- Conus (Dauciconus) kerstitchi Walls, 1978 · accepted, alternate representation; Gradiconus kerstitchi (Walls, 1978)

Species of sea snail

Conus kerstitchi, commonly named Kerstitch's cone, is a species of sea snail, a marine gastropod mollusk in the family Conidae, the cone snails and their allies.

Like all species within the genus Conus, these snails are predatory and venomous. They are capable of stinging humans, therefore live ones should be handled carefully or not at all.

== Description ==
Morphologically, Conus kerstitchi presents an elongately fusiform, high-conic profile. They are currently recognised under the subjective junior synonym of Conus monilifer. Adult specimen typically span 26 mm to 40 mm in length, anchored by a standard holotype profile measuring exactly 31.5 mm by 15.9 mm. The shell is defined by a striking, scalariform spire comprising 6 to 12 whorls rising above a sharply angulate and carinate shoulder. A small, smooth, two-whorl white protoconch sits at its apex. The remaining spire whorls are fundamentally flat to slightly concave. The surface of the dominant body whorl is exceptionally smooth and glossy, exhibiting a rich background tint, that spans from deep golden-yellow to warm yellowish-fawn. This ground color is punctuated by a diagnostic white mid-body band, which is broken up by dark brown or violet-chestnut spots and quadrangular blotches. The elevated spire echoes this contrast, featuring white surfaces decorated with radial brown strands. The slender aperture traces the length of the body whorl, exposing an interior shaded in light violet to soft yellow tones, which terminates at a base stained with a deeper violet-chestnut hue.

== Distribution ==
The species is endemic to the tropical Eastern Pacific Ocean. It is primarily documented along the western coast of the Americas, stretching from the Gulf of California (including Nayarit, Mexico) southward to Ecuador.

It occupies sublittoral environments, typically buried in sandy and muddy substrates at moderate depths ranging from 20 to 70 metres.
