= Conus jourdani =

Conservation status
- Data Deficient (IUCN 3.1)

Scientific classification
- Kingdom: Animalia
- Phylum: Mollusca
- Class: Gastropoda
- Subclass: Caenogastropoda
- Order: Neogastropoda
- Superfamily: Conoidea
- Family: Conidae
- Genus: Conus
- Species: C. jourdani

Binomial name
- Conus jourdani da Motta, 1984

Synonyms
- Conus (Lautoconus) jourdani da Motta, 1984 · accepted, alternate representation; Varioconus jourdani (da Motta, 1984)

Species of sea snail

Conus jourdani is a species of sea snail, a marine gastropod mollusk in the family Conidae, the cone snails and their allies.

Like all species within the genus Conus, these snails are predatory and venomous. They are capable of stinging humans, therefore live ones should be handled carefully or not at all.

== Distribution ==
This species occurs in the Atlantic Ocean off St. Helena. The minimum recorded depth is 0 m. Maximum recorded depth is 0 m.

== Description ==
The maximum recorded shell length is 30.2 mm. The shell is moderately small, solid, compact, broad, and ventricosly conical shell. The sides of the last whorl are straight and convex below the shoulder, which is rounded. The spire is moderately elevated with a straight profile. The surface of the last whorl is smooth above the base. The spiral whorls are usually convex, covered with very fine arcuate radial hairlines. Cords are absent while the protoconch is assumed to be paucispiral. The colour of the shell is bluish-white with a variable number of patterned zones below the shoulder. The spire whorls usually exhibit brown or orange-brown blotches. The aperture is purplish-white in the inside, with the internal margin of the lip stained purple interrupted by two narrow white bands, one at the shoulder and the other at the lower third. The periostracum is pale yellow and translucent. The opurculum is small and elongated typical of a varioconus.
