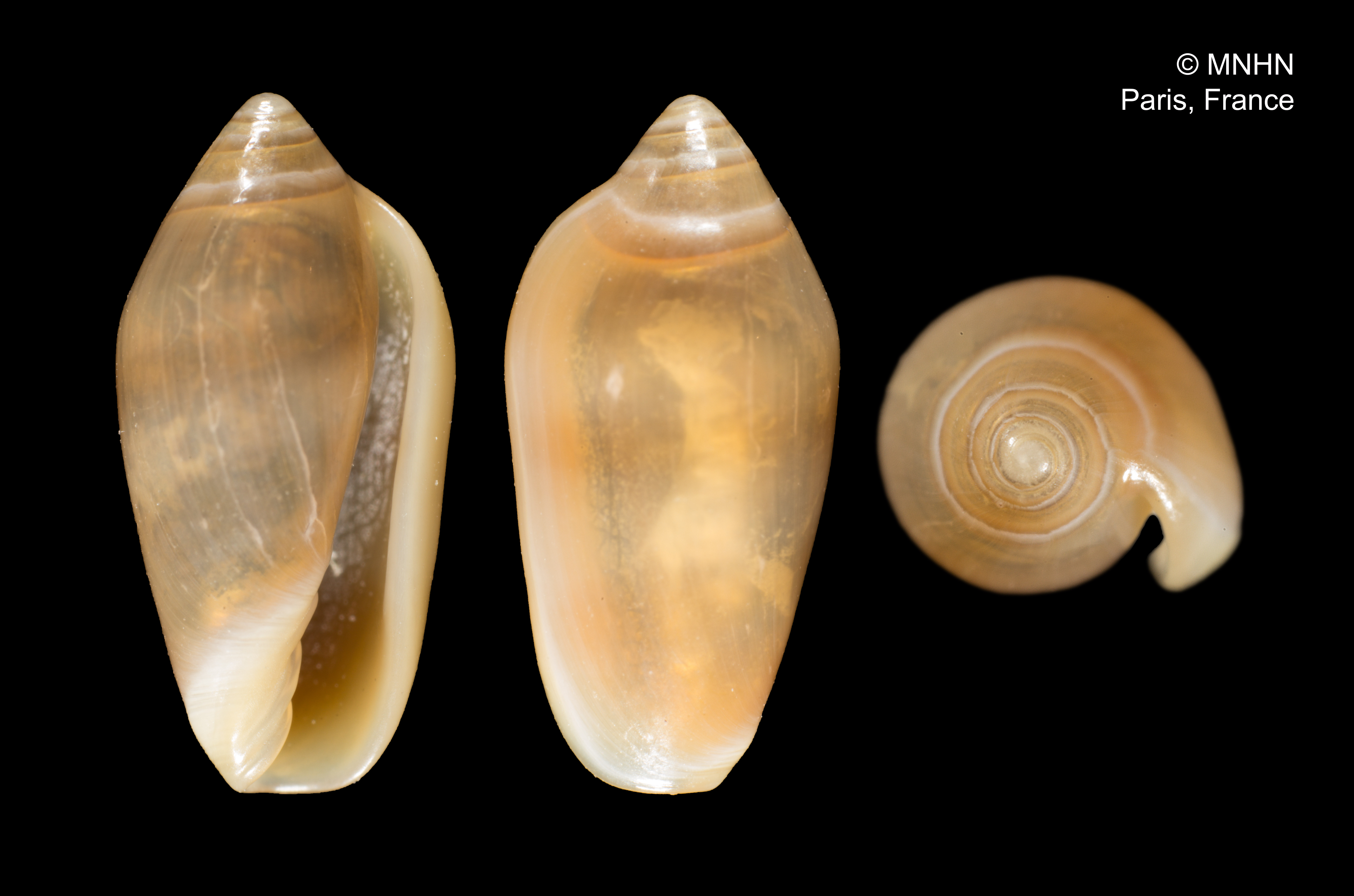

Conservation status
- Data Deficient (IUCN 2.3)

Scientific classification
- Kingdom: Animalia
- Phylum: Mollusca
- Class: Gastropoda
- Subclass: Caenogastropoda
- Order: Neogastropoda
- Family: Marginellidae
- Genus: Volvarina
- Species: V. insulana

Binomial name
- Volvarina insulana Gofas & Fernandes, 1988

= Volvarina insulana =

Species of gastropod

Volvarina insulana is a species of small to very small sea snail, a marine gastropod mollusc in the family Marginellidae, the margin shells.

== Distribution ==
This species is endemic to São Tomé and Príncipe.
