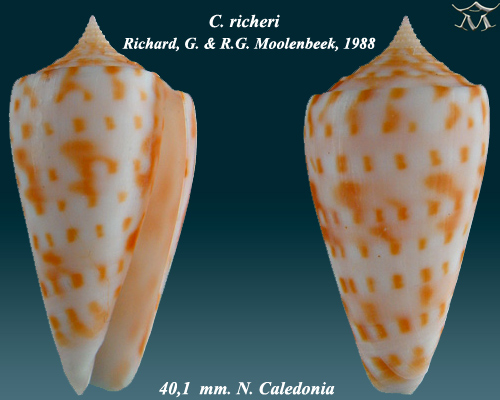
- Apertural and abapertural views of shell of Conus richeri Richard, G. & R.G. Moolenbeek, 1988

Conservation status
- Data Deficient (IUCN 3.1)

Scientific classification
- Kingdom: Animalia
- Phylum: Mollusca
- Class: Gastropoda
- Subclass: Caenogastropoda
- Order: Neogastropoda
- Superfamily: Conoidea
- Family: Conidae
- Genus: Conus
- Species: C. richeri

Binomial name
- Conus richeri Richard & Moolenbeek, 1988

Synonyms
- Asprella richeri (Richard & Moolenbeek, 1988); Conus (Phasmoconus) richeri Richard & Moolenbeek, 1988· accepted, alternate representation; Graphiconus richeri (Richard & Moolenbeek, 1988)

= Conus richeri =

Species of sea snail

Conus richeri is a species of sea snail, a marine gastropod mollusk in the family Conidae, the cone snails and their allies.

Like all species within the genus Conus, these snails are predatory and venomous. They are capable of stinging humans; therefore, live ones should be handled carefully or not at all.

== Description ==
The size of the shell varies between 32 mm and 54 mm.

== Distribution ==
This rare deep water marine species occurs off New Caledonia and the Chesterfield Islands.
