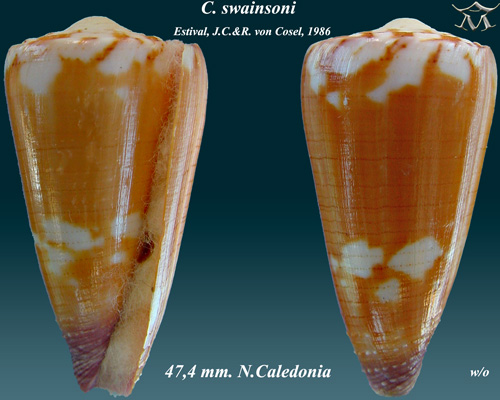
- Apertural and abapertural views of shell of Conus swainsoni Estival, J.C. & R. von Cosel, 1986

Scientific classification
- Kingdom: Animalia
- Phylum: Mollusca
- Class: Gastropoda
- Subclass: Caenogastropoda
- Order: Neogastropoda
- Superfamily: Conoidea
- Family: Conidae
- Genus: Conus
- Species: C. swainsoni

Binomial name
- Conus swainsoni Estival & Cosel, 1986

Synonyms
- Conus (Strategoconus) swainsoni Estival & Cosel, 1986 · accepted, alternate representation; Vituliconus swainsoni (Estival & Cosel, 1986)

= Conus swainsoni =

Species of sea snail

Conus swainsoni is a species of sea snail, a marine gastropod mollusk in the family Conidae, the cone snails and their allies.

Like all species within the genus Conus, these snails are predatory and venomous. They are capable of stinging humans, therefore live ones should be handled carefully or not at all.

== Description ==
The size of the shell varies between 30 mm and 78 mm.

== Discovery ==
The species Conus swainsoni was first described in 1986 by the malacologists Jean-Claude Estival and Rudo von Cosel in VENUS (The Japanese Journal of Malacology).

== Distribution ==
This marine species occurs off New Caledonia.
