= Conus danilai =

Conservation status
- Data Deficient (IUCN 3.1)

Scientific classification
- Kingdom: Animalia
- Phylum: Mollusca
- Class: Gastropoda
- Subclass: Caenogastropoda
- Order: Neogastropoda
- Superfamily: Conoidea
- Family: Conidae
- Genus: Conus
- Species: C. danilai

Binomial name
- Conus danilai Röckel & Korn, 1990

Synonyms
- Conus (Splinoconus) danilai Röckel & Korn, 1990 · accepted, alternate representation; Nitidoconus danilai (Röckel & Korn, 1990); Rolaniconus danilai (Röckel & Korn, 1990)

Species of sea snail

Conus danilai is a species of sea snail, a marine gastropod mollusk in the family Conidae, the cone snails and their allies.

Like all species within the genus Conus, these snails are predatory and venomous. They are capable of stinging humans, therefore live ones should be handled carefully or not at all.

== Description ==
The size of the shell varies between 21 mm and 40 mm.

== Distribution ==
This marine species occurs in the Gulf of Aden and in the northwestern part of the Indian Ocean.
