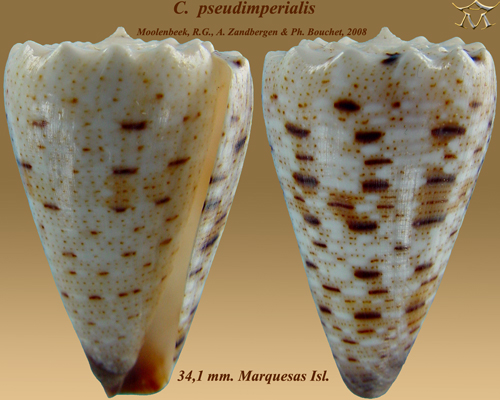
- Apertural and abapertural views of shell of Conus pseudimperialis Moolenbeek, R.G., A. Zandbergen & Ph. Bouchet, 2008

Scientific classification
- Kingdom: Animalia
- Phylum: Mollusca
- Class: Gastropoda
- Subclass: Caenogastropoda
- Order: Neogastropoda
- Superfamily: Conoidea
- Family: Conidae
- Genus: Conus
- Species: C. pseudimperialis

Binomial name
- Conus pseudimperialis Moolenbeek, Zandbergen, & Bouchet, 2008

Synonyms
- Conus (Stephanoconus) pseudimperialis Moolenbeek, Zandbergen & Bouchet, 2008 · accepted, alternate representation; Rhombiconus pseudimperialis (Moolenbeek, Zandbergen & Bouchet, 2008)

= Conus pseudimperialis =

Species of sea snail

Conus pseudimperialis is a species of sea snail, a marine gastropod mollusk in the family Conidae, the cone snails and their allies.

Like all species within the genus Conus, these snails are predatory and venomous. They are capable of stinging humans, therefore live ones should be handled carefully or not at all.

== Description ==
The size of the shell attains 37 mm.

== Distribution ==
This marine species is endemic to the Marquesas.
