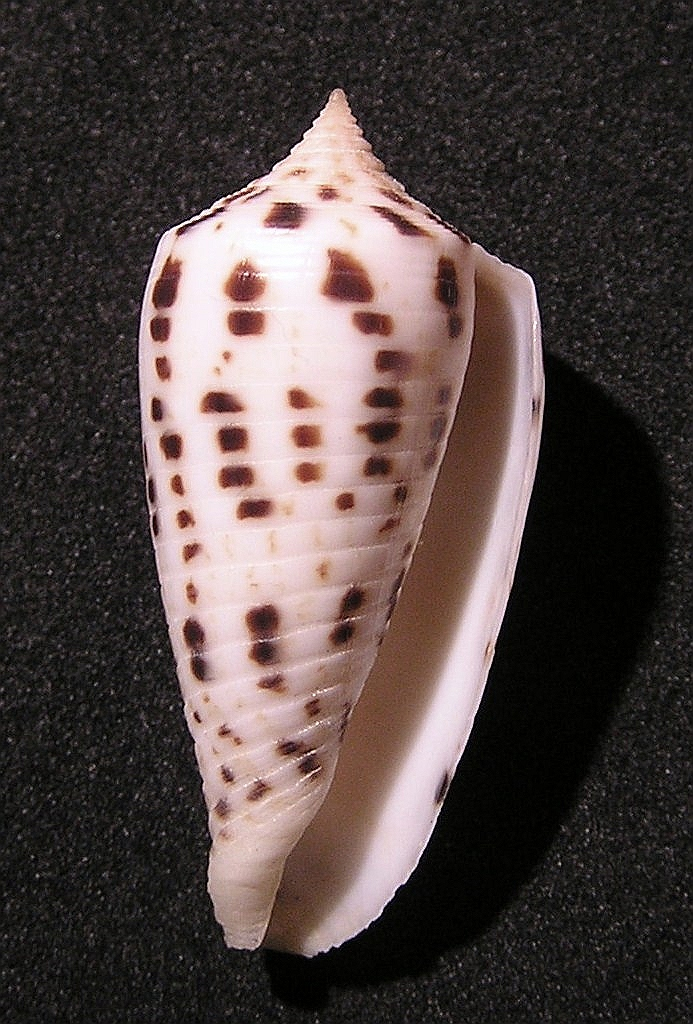
- Apertural view of Conus blanfordianus

Conservation status
- Data Deficient (IUCN 3.1)

Scientific classification
- Kingdom: Animalia
- Phylum: Mollusca
- Class: Gastropoda
- Subclass: Caenogastropoda
- Order: Neogastropoda
- Superfamily: Conoidea
- Family: Conidae
- Genus: Conus
- Species: C. blanfordianus

Binomial name
- Conus blanfordianus Crosse, 1867

Synonyms
- Asprella blanfordiana (Crosse, 1867); Conus (Phasmoconus) blanfordianus Crosse, 1867 · accepted, alternate representation; Graphiconus blanfordianus (Crosse, 1867)

= Conus blanfordianus =

Species of sea snail

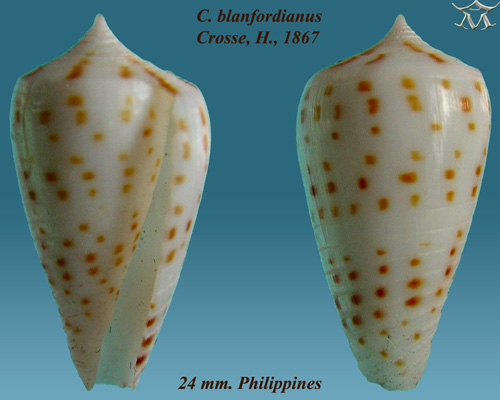
Conus blanfordianus Crosse, H., 1867

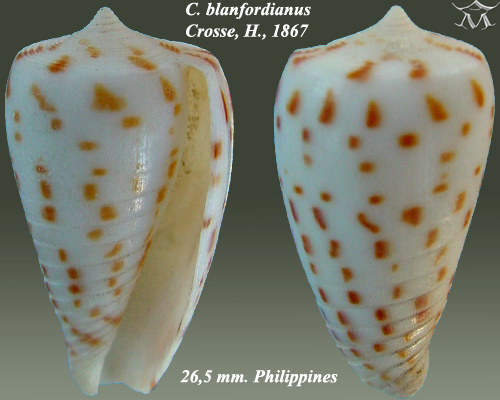
Conus blanfordianus Crosse, H., 1867

Conus blanfordianus is a species of sea snail, a marine gastropod mollusk in the family Conidae, the cone snails and their allies.

Like all species within the genus Conus, these snails are predatory and venomous. They are capable of stinging humans, therefore live ones should be handled carefully or not at all.

== Description ==
The size of an adult shell varies between 22 mm and 58 mm. The shell is somewhat swollen, distantly sulcate below, otherwise smooth. Its color is white, encircled by chestnut spots, clouds, and oblique and triangular markings. The spire is maculated.

== Distribution ==
This marine species occurs in the Pacific Ocean off the Philippines, designated to be the type locality. Reports from Vanuatu and Papua New Guinea are, most likely to be of other species.
