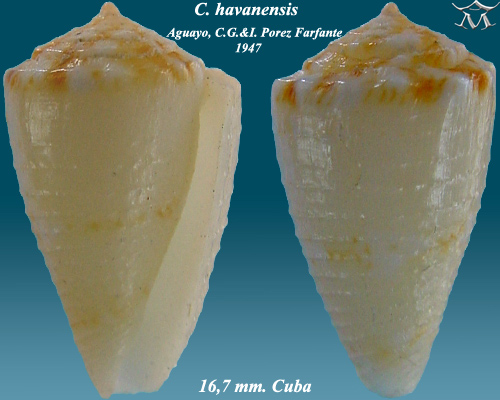
- Apertural and abapertural views of shell of Conus havanensis Aguayo, C.G. & I. Porez Farfante, 1947

Scientific classification
- Kingdom: Animalia
- Phylum: Mollusca
- Class: Gastropoda
- Subclass: Caenogastropoda
- Order: Neogastropoda
- Superfamily: Conoidea
- Family: Conidae
- Genus: Conus
- Species: C. havanensis

Binomial name
- Conus havanensis Aguayo & Farfante, 1947

Synonyms
- Conus (Dauciconus) havanensis Aguayo & Pérez Farfante, 1947 · accepted, alternate representation; Conus olgae Bacallado, Espinosa & Ortea, 2007; Purpuriconus havanensis (Aguayo & Pérez Farfante, 1947)

= Conus havanensis =

Species of sea snail

Conus havanensis is a species of sea snail, a marine gastropod mollusk in the family Conidae, the cone snails and their allies.

Like all species within the genus Conus, these snails are predatory and venomous. They are capable of stinging humans, therefore live ones should be handled carefully or not at all.

== Distribution ==
This marine species occurs off Cuba and Jamaica.

== Description ==
The maximum recorded shell length is 34 mm.

== Habitat ==
Minimum recorded depth is 10 m. Maximum recorded depth is 30 m.
