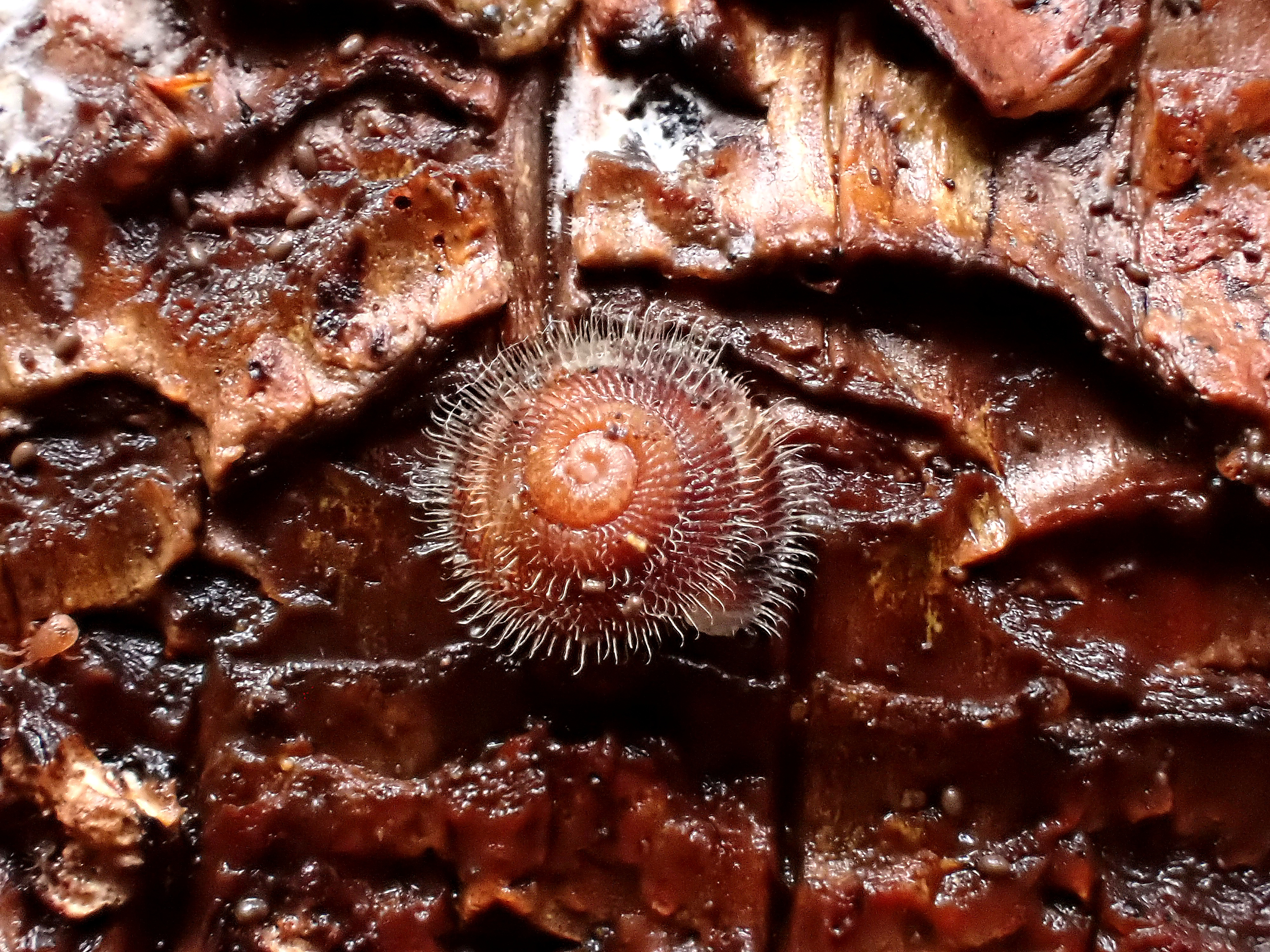
- Live Fanulena imitatrix on Norfolk Island, showing periostracal hairs

Conservation status
- Critically Endangered (IUCN 3.1)

Scientific classification
- Kingdom: Animalia
- Phylum: Mollusca
- Class: Gastropoda
- Order: Stylommatophora
- Family: Microcystidae
- Genus: Fanulena
- Species: F. imitatrix

Binomial name
- Fanulena imitatrix (Sykes, 1900)

Synonyms
- Medyla imitatrix Sykes, 1900; Lutilodix imitatrix Iredale, 1945

= Fanulena imitatrix =

Norfolk Island hairy snail

Species of gastropod

Fanulena imitatrix, commonly known as the Norfolk Island hairy snail (Norf'k: laha snail), is a species of air-breathing land snail, a terrestrial pulmonate gastropod mollusk in the family Microcystidae. It is the type species of the genus Fanulena and is endemic to Norfolk Island. It is one of three Norfolk Island land snail species identified as being at highest risk of extinction.

== Taxonomy ==
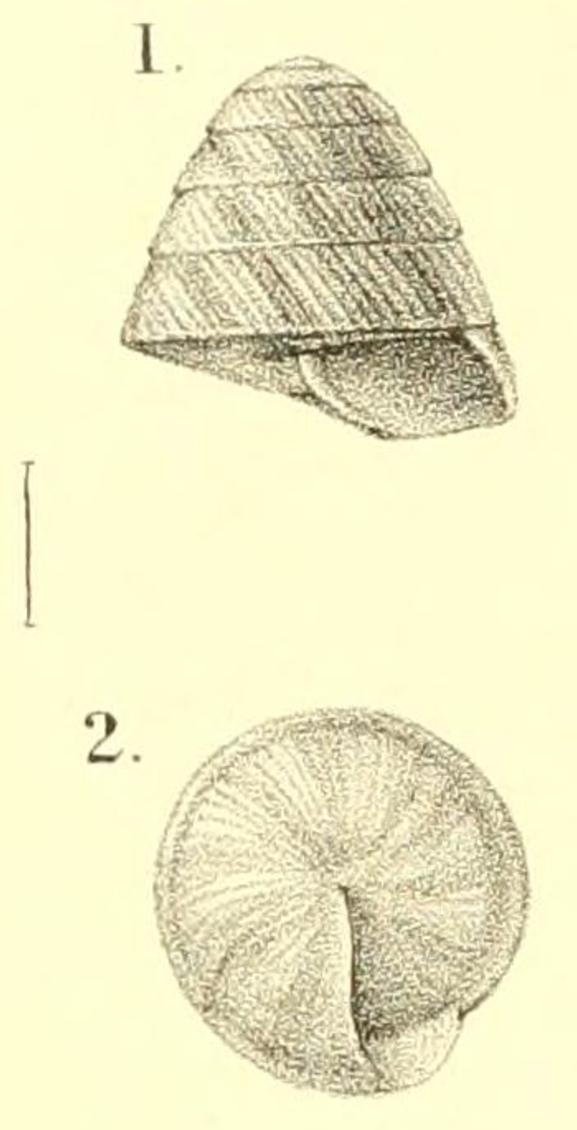
Original illustration of Fanulena imitatrix (as Medyla imitatrix) from Sykes, 1900

The species was first described by Ernest Ruthven Sykes in 1900 as Medyla imitatrix. In 1945, Tom Iredale transferred the species to his newly erected genus Lutilodix, distinguishing it from other Norfolk Island Fanulena species. Subsequent authors synonymised Lutilodix with Fanulena, a treatment upheld by a comprehensive molecular and morphological revision in 2023. Phylogenetic analyses of mitochondrial DNA (COI and 16S genes) place F. imitatrix within Clade B of the Norfolk Island Microcystidae, together with the congeners F. insculpta and F. amiculus.

The species was previously placed in Punctidae by Schileyko (2002) based on shell sculpture; however, anatomical investigation revealed a unilobed kidney and a reproductive system characteristic of Microcystidae, confirming its placement in that family.

== Description ==
The shell is small, measuring 5.6–6.8 mm in width and 4.9–6.0 mm in height, with 6.0–6.5 whorls. It is dark golden brown to chocolate brown with cream flammulations, conical in shape with a domed, strongly raised spire and apex. The protoconch is sculptured with moderately closely spaced radial ribs, faint to obsolete on the early whorl but becoming stronger towards the teleoconch. The teleoconch is sculptured with strong, moderately closely spaced radial ribs ornamented with long periostracal hairs arranged in spiral rows — four rows on early whorls and five to seven rows on outer whorls. This distinctive hair-like sculpture gives the species its common name. The whorl profile is rounded above and below a keeled periphery. The aperture is ovate, with a small, indistinct columellar tooth.

The animal is grey with a white sole. Unlike many other Norfolk Island microcystids, F. imitatrix completely lacks shell lappets.

=== Reproductive anatomy ===
Fanulena imitatrix possesses a short penis that is not coiled within the penial tunica, with a small blind tip that narrows significantly towards the penis–epiphallus boundary. The inner penial wall is flat with v-shaped grooves in the upper half and a single longitudinal pilaster in the lower half. A small penial papilla is present at the base of the penis, a feature not found in any other Fanulena species and diagnostically important for identification. The penial wall is thick and the penial tunica is strong but not very thick.

Like all Norfolk Island microcystids, F. imitatrix is ovoviviparous.

== Distribution and habitat ==
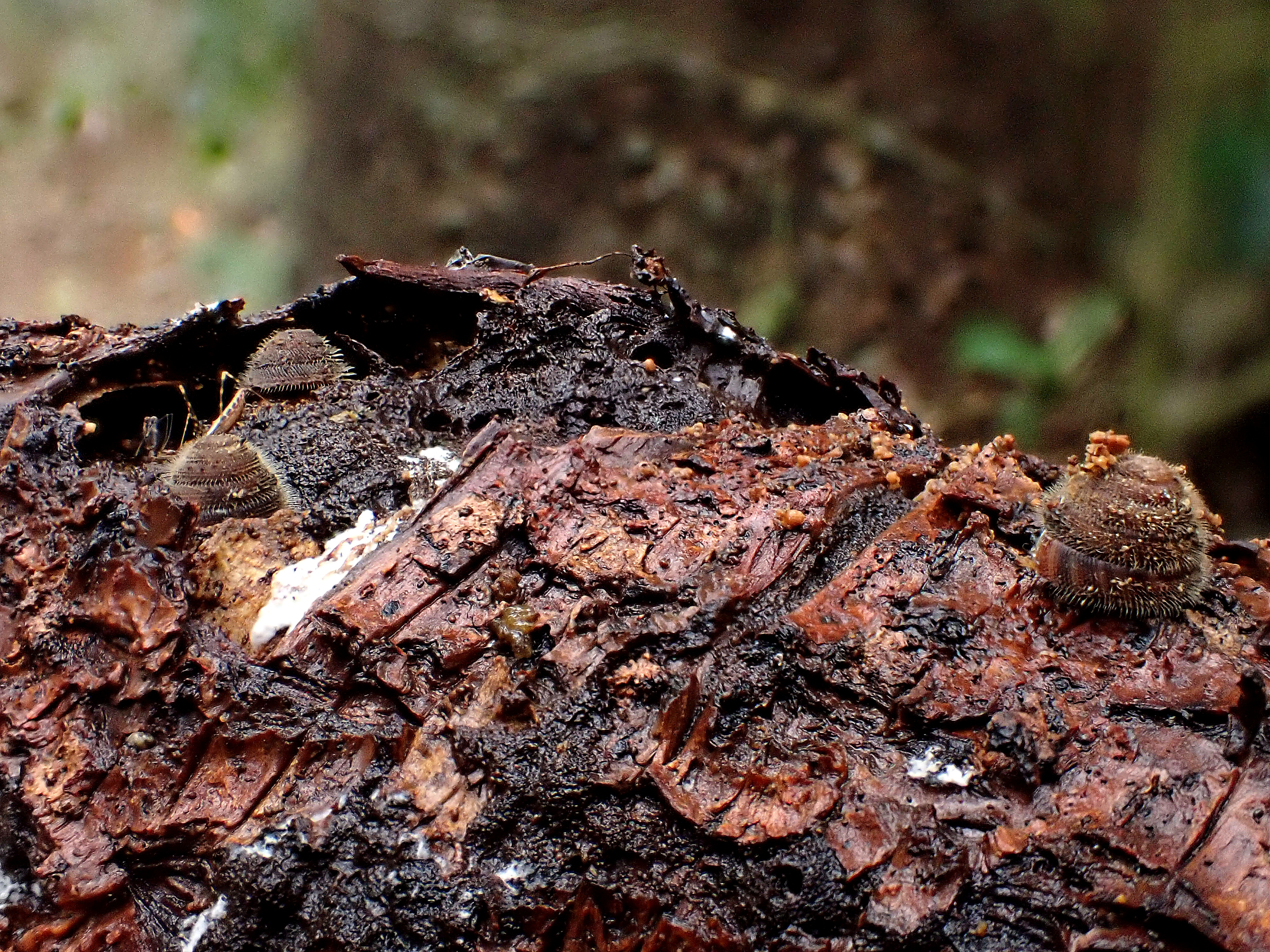
Fanulena imitatrix sheltering on decaying Norfolk pine log, Norfolk Island

This species is endemic to Norfolk Island, a volcanic island situated approximately 1,500 km from the Australian mainland and 1,000 km from New Zealand in the South Pacific Ocean.

The historical distribution of F. imitatrix is poorly understood; the original 1900 description lacked locality data. The species is common in subfossil deposits at Emily Bay and Cemetery Bay, indicating it was once more widespread. A single specimen was reportedly recorded from Mount Pitt by Neuweger et al. (2001), but the identity could not be confirmed.

As of the most recent surveys, the species is known only from a single population in Selwyn Reserve, where it inhabits remnant subtropical rainforest and shelters under logs and palm fronds in leaf litter.

== Conservation ==
=== Status ===
Fanulena imitatrix was listed as Endangered on the IUCN Red List in 1996 (under the name Lutilodix imitratrix). Following intensive targeted surveys between 2020 and 2023, Hyman et al. (2024) recommended an updated assessment of Critically Endangered, reflecting the species' extremely restricted range and small population size. It is one of three Norfolk Island snail species identified as being at highest immediate risk of extinction, alongside Advena campbellii and Advena suteri.

Norfolk Island's land snails have suffered more recorded extinctions than any comparable island group for their size, driven primarily by habitat loss through extensive clearing of native subtropical rainforest since British settlement in 1788, and predation by introduced species including the black rat (Rattus rattus), Polynesian rat (Rattus exulans), feral chickens (Gallus domesticus), and the blue garden flatworm (Caenoplana coerulea).

=== Conservation actions ===
In response to the critical status of F. imitatrix and two other threatened species, an alliance of Parks Australia, Norfolk Island Regional Council, Taronga Conservation Society Australia and the Australian Museum Research Institute was formed in 2020 to implement conservation interventions.

At Selwyn Reserve, habitat enhancement was undertaken in mid-2022 through the addition of coarse woody debris in the form of piles of small logs of Norfolk Island pine (Araucaria heterophylla). Subsequent surveys found that F. imitatrix was using these log-piles as shelter sites, suggesting this is a relatively low-cost intervention of considerable benefit in environments where natural shelter sites are lacking.

Future conservation plans include the possibility of establishing an ex-situ breeding population of F. imitatrix at Taronga Zoo, building on the successful captive breeding programme already developed for A. campbellii. A related species, the Campbell's keeled glass-snail (A. campbellii), has been the subject of a successful captive breeding and reintroduction programme, with over 300 individuals released into Norfolk Island National Park in 2025.
