= Innesoconcha segna =

Scientific classification
- Domain: Eukaryota
- Kingdom: Animalia
- Phylum: Mollusca
- Class: Gastropoda
- Order: Stylommatophora
- Superfamily: Trochomorphoidea
- Family: Microcystidae
- Genus: Innesoconcha
- Species: I. segna

Binomial name
- Innesoconcha segna Iredale, 1944
- Location of Lord Howe Island

Species of land snail

Innesoconcha segna, also known as the pale glass-snail, is a species of land snail that is endemic to Australia's Lord Howe Island in the Tasman Sea.

== Taxonomy ==
I. segna is sometimes considered to be a junior synonym of I. catletti. However, the two forms exhibit differences in their shells as well as their genital anatomy, and they are treated as separate species by Hyman & Köhler (2020).

== Description ==
The depressedly trochoidal shell of the mature snail is 5.9–7.8 mm in height, with a low spire and a diameter of 10.7–12 mm. It is glossy and pale golden-yellow in colour The whorls are rounded, with finely incised spiral grooves. It has an ovately lunate aperture and closed umbilicus. The body of the animal (in alcohol) is light orange-brown.

== Distribution and habitat ==
The snail is evidently very rare and known only from the localities of Boat Harbour and Rocky Run Creek on the island. It has only been collected in low numbers, and may be extinct.
