= Mount Matafao different snail =

Conservation status
- Extinct (IUCN 2.3)

Scientific classification
- Kingdom: Animalia
- Phylum: Mollusca
- Class: Gastropoda
- Order: Stylommatophora
- Family: Microcystidae
- Genus: Diastole
- Species: †D. matafaoi

Binomial name
- †Diastole matafaoi H. B. Baker, 1938

Species of mollusc

The Mount Matafao different snail, scientific name Diastole matafaoi, was a species of air-breathing land snails or semi-slugs, terrestrial pulmonate gastropod mollusks in the family Microcystidae.

This species was endemic to American Samoa. It is now extinct.
