= List of non-marine molluscs of the Pitcairn Islands =

The non-marine molluscs of Pitcairn Islands are a part of the molluscan fauna of the Pitcairn Islands.

- Pitcairn Island: 24 species of land snails and one semi-terrestrial gastropod
- Henderson Island: 16 species (7 families) of land snails and two semi-terrestrial molluscs
- Ducie Island: less than six species of land snails
- Oeno Island: less than six species of land snails

There is a high degree of endemism of these species.

== Gastropoda ==
=== Land gastropods ===
Land gastropods and semi-terrestrial gastropods include:

Hydrocenidae

- Georissa hendersoni Preece, 1995 - Henderson Island
- Georissa minutissima (G. B. Sowerby, 1832) - Pitcairn Island

Helicinidae

- Orobophana solidula (G. B. Sowerby in Gray, 1839) - Henderson Island

Assimineidae

- Assiminea sp. - Henderson Island, Pitcairn Island

Ellobiidae

- Allochroa layardi (H. & A. Adams, 1855) - Henderson Island, Oeno Island
- Melampus flavus (Gmelin, 1791) - Henderson Island, Oeno Island, Ducie Island, Pitcairn Island

Achatinellidae

- Tubuaia fosbergi Kondo, 1962 - Pitcairn Island
- Tubuaia hendersoni Kondo, 1962 - Henderson Island
- Tubuaia voyana christiani Kondo, 1962 - Pitcairn Island
- Pacificella variabilis Odhner, 1922 - Henderson Island, Ducie Island, Pitcairn Island
- Pacificella filica Preece, 1995 - Pitcairn Island
- Lamellidea cf. micropleura Cooke & Kondo, 1961 - Henderson Island, Pitcairn Island
- Lamellidea oblonga (Pease, 1865) - Henderson Island, Pitcairn Island
- Lamellidea sp. - Henderson Island, Oeno Island, Pitcairn Island
- Elasmias sp. - Henderson Island, Pitcairn Island
- Tornatellides oblongus (Anton, 1839)
  - Tornatellides oblongus oblongus (Anton, 1839) - Pitcairn Island
  - Tornatellides oblongus parvulus Cooke & Kondo, 1961 - Henderson Island

Pupillidae

- Pupisoma orcula (Benson, 1850) - Henderson Island, Pitcairn Island

Vertiginidae

- Nesopupa cf. pleurophora (Shuttleworth, 1852) - Henderson Island
- Nesopupa sp. nov. - Henderson Island
- cf. Columella sp. - Oeno island
- Pronesopupa sp. - Henderson Island

Subulinidae

- Subulina octona (Bruguière, 1789) - Pitcairn Island, introduced
- Opeas pumilum (Pfeiffer, 1840) - Pitcairn Island, introduced
- Allopeas clavulinum (Potiez & Michaud, 1838) - Pitcairn Island, introduced
- Allopeas gracile (Hutton, 1834) - Pitcairn Island, introduced

Endodontidae

- Minidonta hendersoni Cooke & Solem in Solem, 1976 - Henderson Island

Charopidae

- Sinployea pitcairnensis Preece, 1995 - Pitcairn Island

Helicarionidae

- Philonesia pitcairnensis Baker, 1838 - Pitcairn Island
- Philonesia filiceti (Beck, 1837) - Pitcairn Island
- Diastole glaucina Baker, 1938 - Henderson Island
- Diastole tenuistriata Preece, 1995 - Pitcairn Island

Pristilomatidae

- Hawaiia minuscula (A. Binney, 1840) - Pitcairn Island, introduced

Gastrodontidae

- Zonitoides arboreus (Say, 1817) - Pitcairn Island, introduced

Agriolimacidae

- Deroceras sp. - Pitcairn Island, introduced

== See also ==
- List of marine molluscs of the Pitcairn Islands
- List of non-marine molluscs of the Gambier Islands
- List of non-marine molluscs of the Cook Islands
- List of non-marine molluscs of Easter Island
