= N. dispersa =

N. dispersa may refer to:

- Nesopupa dispersa, species of land snail in the family Vertiginidae
- Notocorrhenes dispersa, the only species in the genus Notocorrhenes
