= Tengchiena euroxestus =

Conservation status
- Data Deficient (IUCN 2.3)

Scientific classification
- Kingdom: Animalia
- Phylum: Mollusca
- Class: Gastropoda
- Order: Stylommatophora
- Family: Microcystidae
- Genus: Tengchiena
- Species: T. euroxestus

Binomial name
- Tengchiena euroxestus Iredale, 1937

Synonyms
- Euplecta rathouisiana (Heude, 1882) superseded combination; Hyalina rathouisii Heude, 1882 superseded combination

Species of gastropod

Tengchiena euroxestus is a species of very small air-breathing land snails, terrestrial pulmonate gastropod mollusks in the family Microcystidae, the hive snails.

This species is endemic to Australia.
