= Innesoconcha aberrans =

Scientific classification
- Kingdom: Animalia
- Phylum: Mollusca
- Class: Gastropoda
- Order: Stylommatophora
- Superfamily: Trochomorphoidea
- Family: Microcystidae
- Genus: Innesoconcha
- Species: I. aberrans

Binomial name
- Innesoconcha aberrans Iredale, 1944
- Location of Lord Howe Island

Species of land snail

Innesoconcha aberrans, also known as the black face glass-snail, is a species of land snail that is endemic to Australia's Lord Howe Island in the Tasman Sea.

== Description ==
The depressedly trochoidal shell of the mature snail is 4.4–5.1 mm in height, with a diameter of 6.9–8.1 mm, golden-brown in colour. The whorls are flattened above and rounded below an angular periphery, with weakly impressed sutures and strong radial growth lines. It has an ovately lunate aperture and closed umbilicus. The animal is black.

== Distribution and habitat ==
The snail is rare and known only from the summit and upper slopes of Mount Lidgbird, where it is found on basalt rocks.
