= Tengchiena =

Scientific classification
- Kingdom: Animalia
- Phylum: Mollusca
- Class: Gastropoda
- Order: Stylommatophora
- Infraorder: Limacoidei
- Superfamily: Trochomorphoidea
- Family: Microcystidae
- Genus: Tengchiena; Baker, 1942

Type species
- Hyalina rathouisii Heude, 1882

Genus of gastropods

Tengchiena is a genus of very small air-breathing land snails, terrestrial pulmonate gastropod mollusks in the family Microcystidae, the hive snails.

== Species ==
Species within the genus Tengchiena include:

- Tengchiena euroxestus (Heude, 1882)
