= Diastole tenuistriata =

Conservation status
- Vulnerable (IUCN 2.3)

Scientific classification
- Kingdom: Animalia
- Phylum: Mollusca
- Class: Gastropoda
- Order: Stylommatophora
- Family: Microcystidae
- Genus: Diastole
- Species: D. tenuistriata

Binomial name
- Diastole tenuistriata Preece, 1995

Species of gastropod

Diastole tenuistriata is a species of air-breathing land snail or semi-slug, terrestrial pulmonate gastropod mollusc in the family Microcystidae.

This species is endemic to the Pitcairn Islands, a British territory in the southern Pacific Ocean.
