= Afripupa =

Scientific classification
- Kingdom: Animalia
- Phylum: Mollusca
- Class: Gastropoda
- Order: Stylommatophora
- Infraorder: Pupilloidei
- Superfamily: Pupilloidea
- Family: Vertiginidae
- Genus: Afripupa; Pilsbry & C. M. Cooke, 1920

Type species
- Pupa (Vertigo) tantilla A. Gould, 1847

Genus of land snails

Afripupa is a genus of very small air-breathing land snails, terrestrial pulmonate gastropod mollusks in the subfamily Nesopupinae of the family Vertiginidae.

== Taxonomy ==
This genus has become a synonym of Vertigo (Staurodon) R. T. Lowe, 1852 represented as Vertigo O. F. Müller, 1773. Afripupa has been formerly assigned to the Nesopupinae. The recent molecular phylogeny of the Vertiginidae by Nekola & Coles (2016) suggests a close relationship of Afripupa with Vertigo instead.

== Species ==
- † Afripupa blumi (O. Boettger, 1884)
- Afripupa densestriata (Adam, 1954)
- Afripupa kanongae (Adam, 1954)
- † Afripupa kenyensis Pickford, 2019
- Afripupa misaliensis Gittenberger & van Bruggen, 2013
- Afripupa pelengeae (Adam, 1954)
- Afripupa rodriguezensis (Connolly, 1925)
- Afripupa vengoensis (Connolly, 1925)

Species brought into synonymy

- Afripupa bisulcata (Jickeli, 1873): synonym of Vertigo bisulcata (Jickeli, 1873)
- Afripupa farquhari (Pilsbry, 1917): synonym of Vertigo farquhari Pilsbry, 1917 (superseded combination)
- Afripupa griqualandica (Melvill & Ponsonby, 1893): synonym of Vertigo griqualandica (Melvill & Ponsonby, 1893) (superseded combination)
- Afripupa iota (Preston, 1911): synonym of Afripupa bisulcata (Jickeli, 1873): synonym of Vertigo bisulcata (Jickeli, 1873) (junior synonym)
