= Cylindrovertilla kingi =

Conservation status
- Least Concern (IUCN 2.3)

Scientific classification
- Kingdom: Animalia
- Phylum: Mollusca
- Class: Gastropoda
- Order: Stylommatophora
- Family: Vertiginidae
- Genus: Cylindrovertilla
- Species: C. kingi

Binomial name
- Cylindrovertilla kingi (Cox, 1864)

Synonyms
- Pupa kingi Cox, 1864; Pupa mastersi Cox, 1864; Wallivertilla kingi negata Iredale, 1940

Species of gastropod

Cylindrovertilla kingi, common name King's amber pupasnail, is a species of small, air-breathing land snail, terrestrial pulmonate gastropod molluscs or micromolluscs in the family Vertiginidae, the whorl snails.

== Distribution ==
This terrestrial species is endemic to Australia.and occurs in New South Wales and Queensland
