= Nesopupa eapensis =

Conservation status
- Data Deficient (IUCN 2.3)

Scientific classification
- Kingdom: Animalia
- Phylum: Mollusca
- Class: Gastropoda
- Order: Stylommatophora
- Family: Vertiginidae
- Genus: Nesopupa
- Species: N. eapensis

Binomial name
- Nesopupa eapensis (O. Boettger, 1880)

Species of gastropod

Nesopupa eapensis is a species of a very small air-breathing land snail, a terrestrial pulmonate gastropod mollusk in the family Vertiginidae. This species is endemic to Palau.
