= Nesopupa alloia =

Conservation status
- Data Deficient (IUCN 2.3)

Scientific classification
- Kingdom: Animalia
- Phylum: Mollusca
- Class: Gastropoda
- Order: Stylommatophora
- Family: Vertiginidae
- Genus: Nesopupa
- Species: N. alloia

Binomial name
- Nesopupa alloia Cooke & Pilsbry, 1920

Species of gastropod

Nesopupa alloia is a species of very small air-breathing land snail, a terrestrial pulmonate gastropod mollusks in the family Vertiginidae the whorl snails.

This species is endemic to Hawaii in the United States.
