= Nesopupa madgei =

Conservation status
- Vulnerable (IUCN 2.3)

Scientific classification
- Kingdom: Animalia
- Phylum: Mollusca
- Class: Gastropoda
- Order: Stylommatophora
- Family: Vertiginidae
- Genus: Nesopupa
- Species: N. madgei

Binomial name
- Nesopupa madgei Peile, 1936

Species of gastropod

Nesopupa madgei is a species of very small, air-breathing land snail, a terrestrial pulmonate gastropod mollusks in the family Vertiginidae the whorl snails. This species is found in the islands of Mauritius and Réunion.
