= Nesopupa turtoni =

Conservation status
- Extinct (IUCN 2.3)

Scientific classification
- Kingdom: Animalia
- Phylum: Mollusca
- Class: Gastropoda
- Order: Stylommatophora
- Family: Vertiginidae
- Genus: Nesopupa
- Species: †N. turtoni

Binomial name
- †Nesopupa turtoni Smith, 1892

Species of gastropod

Nesopupa turtoni is a species of very small, air-breathing land snail, a terrestrial pulmonate gastropod mollusk in the family Vertiginidae, the whorl snails. This species is Endemic to Saint Helena island; it was thought to be extinct until its rediscovery in 2003.

The shell of this species is up to 2.5 mm long and 1.2 mm wide, with a short, stout, sub-cylindrical shell and a squarish aperture.
