= Allenoconcha retinaculum =

Conservation status
- Vulnerable (IUCN 2.3)

Scientific classification
- Kingdom: Animalia
- Phylum: Mollusca
- Class: Gastropoda
- Order: Stylommatophora
- Family: Microcystidae
- Genus: Allenoconcha
- Species: A. retinaculum

Binomial name
- Allenoconcha retinaculum (Preston, 1913)

Synonyms
- Buffetia retinaculum (Preston, 1913) (unavailable genus name); Nitor retinaculum Preston, 1913 (original combination)

Species of gastropod

Allenoconcha retinaculum is a species of air-breathing land snail, a terrestrial pulmonate gastropod mollusc in the family Microcystidae.

== Description ==
The height of the shell attains 1.5 mm, its diameter 3 mm.

(Original description) The small shell is conically depressed. It is thin, transparent, and slightly glossy with a yellowish-brown hue. It consists of four whorls that increase in size regularly, with the body whorl being subtly angled at the periphery. The shell is sculpted with closely spaced, oblique, arcuate folds, which are more pronounced on the later whorls. The suture is distinctly impressed. The columella margin is curved at the top, descending very obliquely, and thickened inwardly into a whitish, loop-like lamella, visible through the shell. The outer lip is sharp, and the aperture is obliquely compressed and slightly elevated.

== Distribution ==
This species is endemic to Norfolk Island.
