= Nesopupa baldwini =

Conservation status
- Data Deficient (IUCN 2.3)

Scientific classification
- Kingdom: Animalia
- Phylum: Mollusca
- Class: Gastropoda
- Order: Stylommatophora
- Family: Vertiginidae
- Genus: Nesopupa
- Species: N. baldwini

Binomial name
- Nesopupa baldwini Ancey, 1904

Species of gastropod

Nesopupa baldwini is a species of very small air-breathing land snail, a terrestrial pulmonate gastropod mollusks in the family Vertiginidae the whorl snails. This species is endemic to Hawaii in the USA.
