= Philonesia filiceti =

Conservation status
- Vulnerable (IUCN 2.3)

Scientific classification
- Kingdom: Animalia
- Phylum: Mollusca
- Class: Gastropoda
- Order: Stylommatophora
- Family: Euconulidae
- Genus: Philonesia
- Species: P. filiceti

Binomial name
- Philonesia filiceti (Beck, 1837)

Species of gastropod

Philonesia filiceti is a species of air-breathing land snail or semislug, a terrestrial pulmonate gastropod mollusc in the family Euconulidae. This species is endemic to Pitcairn.
