= Sterkia =

Scientific classification
- Kingdom: Animalia
- Phylum: Mollusca
- Class: Gastropoda
- Order: Stylommatophora
- Family: Vertiginidae
- Genus: Sterkia; Pilsbry, 1898

Genus of gastropods

Sterkia is a genus of minute, air-breathing, land snails, terrestrial pulmonate gastropod mollusks which were formerly classified in the family Pupillidae now in the family Vertiginidae instead.

== Species ==
Species within the genus Sterkia include:

- Sterkia antillensis Pilsbry, 1920
- Sterkia bakeri Pilsbry, 1921
- Sterkia eyriesii (Drouët, 1859) – Caribbean Birddrop

Synonyms

- Sterkia calamitosa (Pilsbry, 1889) – Mexican birddrop: synonym of Vertigo calamitosa (Pilsbry, 1889)
- Sterkia clementina (Sterki, 1890) – insular birddrop: synonym of Vertigo clementina (Sterki, 1890) (superseded combination)
- Sterkia hemphilli (Sterki, 1890) – California Birddrop: synonym of Vertigo hemphilli (Sterki, 1890) (superseded combination)
