= Innesoconcha princeps =

Scientific classification
- Kingdom: Animalia
- Phylum: Mollusca
- Class: Gastropoda
- Order: Stylommatophora
- Superfamily: Trochomorphoidea
- Family: Microcystidae
- Genus: Innesoconcha
- Species: I. princeps

Binomial name
- Innesoconcha princeps Iredale, 1944
- Location of Lord Howe Island

Species of land snail

Innesoconcha princeps, also known as the banded golden glass-snail, is a species of land snail that is endemic to Australia's Lord Howe Island in the Tasman Sea.

== Description ==
The depressedly trochoidal shell of the mature snail is 5–5.6 mm in height, with a diameter of 8.8–9.1 mm. It is very glossy and golden-brown in colour, with finely incised spiral grooves. It has a low spire; the whorls are flattened above and rounded below an angular periphery. It has an ovately lunate aperture and closed umbilicus. The animal is dark grey to black.

== Distribution and habitat ==
The snail is known only from the summits of Mount Gower and Mount Lidgbird, where it is found in mossy gnarled cloud forest in leaf litter and the leaf sheaths of palms.
