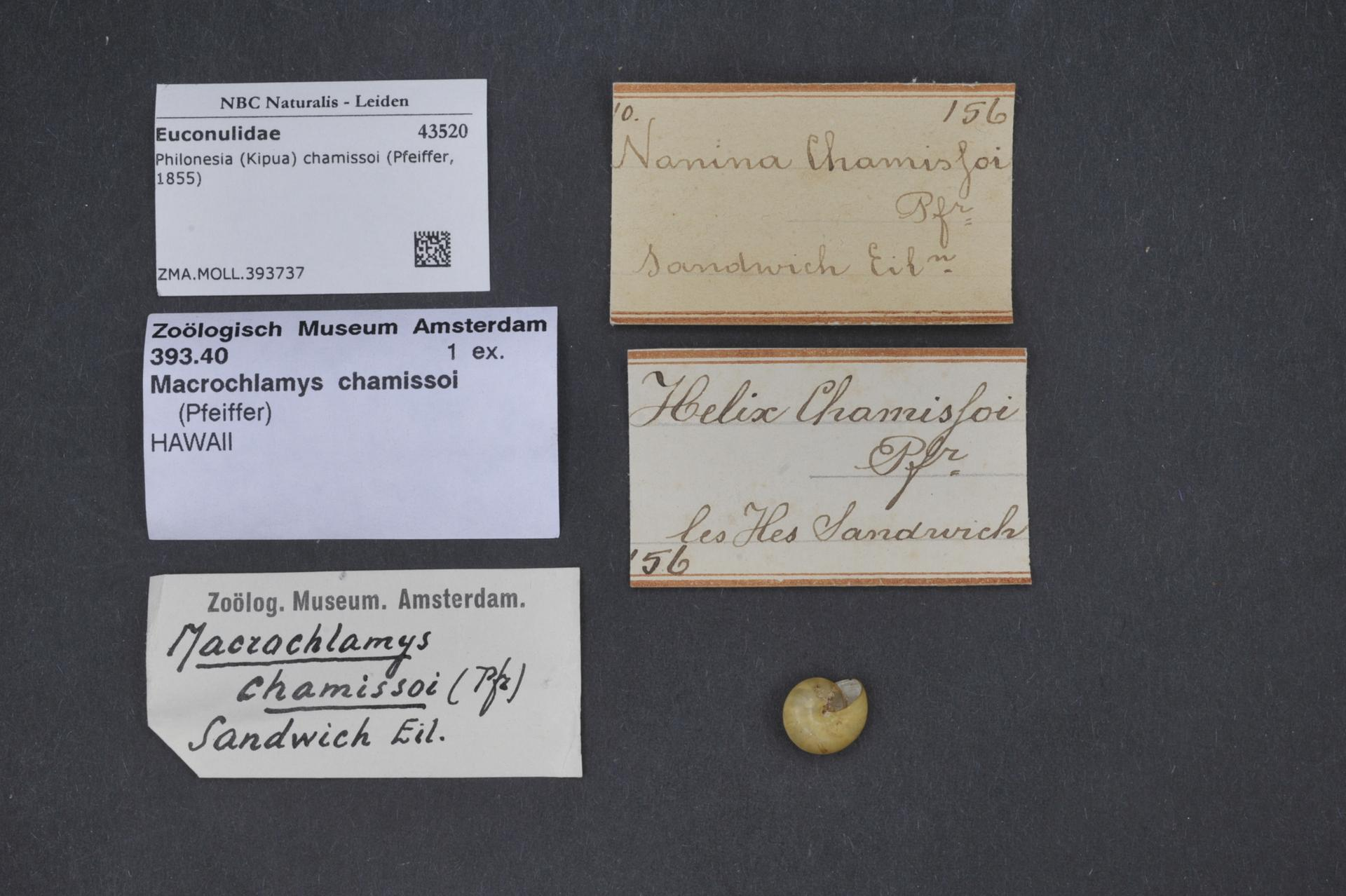
- Philonesia chamissoi specimen

Scientific classification
- Kingdom: Animalia
- Phylum: Mollusca
- Class: Gastropoda
- Order: Stylommatophora
- Infraorder: Limacoidei
- Superfamily: Trochomorphoidea
- Family: Euconulidae
- Genus: Philonesia; Sykes, 1900

Type species
- Microcystis baldwini Ancey, 1889

Synonyms
- Philonesia (Aa) H. B. Baker, 1940· accepted, alternate representation; Philonesia (Haleakala) H. B. Baker, 1940· accepted, alternate representation; Philonesia (Hilooa) H. B. Baker, 1940· accepted, alternate representation; Philonesia (Kipua) H. B. Baker, 1940· accepted, alternate representation; Philonesia (Mauka) H. B. Baker, 1940· accepted, alternate representation; Philonesia (Nesarion) H. B. Baker, 1940· accepted, alternate representation; Philonesia (Nukupiena) H. B. Baker, 1940· accepted, alternate representation; Philonesia (Oafatua) H. B. Baker, 1940· accepted, alternate representation; Philonesia (Philonesia) Sykes, 1900· accepted, alternate representation; Philonesia (Piena) H. B. Baker, 1940· accepted, alternate representation; Philonesia (Pitcairnia) H. B. Baker, 1940· accepted, alternate representation; Philonesia (Rapafila) H. B. Baker, 1940· accepted, alternate representation; Philonesia (Uafatua) H. B. Baker, 1940· accepted, alternate representation; Philonesia (Waihoua) H. B. Baker, 1940· accepted, alternate representation

= Philonesia =

Genus of gastropods

Philonesia is a genus of air-breathing land snails or semislugs, terrestrial pulmonate gastropod mollusks in the family Euconulidae.

== Subtaxa ==
Philonesia has the following subgenera, species, and subspecies:

- Aa H.B.Baker, 1940
  - Philonesia abeillei (Ancey), 1889
  - Philonesia gouveiana H.B.Baker, 1940
  - Philonesia mapulehuae H.B.Baker, 1940
  - Philonesia sericans (Ancey), 1889
  - Philonesia waiheensis H.B.Baker, 1940 – type species
- Haleakala H.B.Baker, 1940
  - Philonesia guavarum H.B.Baker, 1940
  - Philonesia hahakeae H.B.Baker, 1940
  - Philonesia indefinita (Ancey), 1889
  - Philonesia interjecta H.B.Baker, 1940
  - Philonesia pusilla H.B.Baker, 1940
  - Philonesia turgida (Ancey), 1890
    - Philonesia turgida diducta H.B.Baker, 1940 – type subspecies
- Hilooa H.B.Baker, 1940
  - Philonesia hiloi H.B.Baker, 1940 – type species
  - Philonesia piihonuae H.B.Baker, 1940
- Kipua H.B.Baker, 1940
  - Philonesia arenofunus H.B.Baker, 1940
  - Philonesia chamissoi (Pfeiffer, 1855 – type species
- Mauka H.B.Baker, 1940
  - Philonesia polita H.B.Baker, 1940
  - Philonesia similaris H.B.Baker, 1940
  - Philonesia welchi H.B.Baker, 1940 – type species
- Nesarion H.B.Baker, 1940
  - Philonesia tenuissima H.B.Baker, 1940 – type species
    - Philonesia tenuissima obesoir H.B.Baker, 1940
    - Philonesia tenuissima tahuatae H.B.Baker, 1940
- Nukupiena H.B.Baker, 1940
  - Philonesia inflata H.B.Baker, 1940
  - Philonesia ordinaria H.B.Baker, 1940 – type species
- Oafatua H.B.Baker, 1940
  - Philonesia contigua Garrett, 1887
  - Philonesia fatuhivae H.B.Baker, 1940
  - Philonesia lenta Garrett), 1887
  - Philonesia micra H.B.Baker, 1940
  - Philonesia pura Garrett, 1887
  - Philonesia uahukae H.B.Baker, 1940
  - Philonesia uapouae H.B.Baker, 1940 – type species
- Philonesia H.B.Baker, 1940
  - Philonesia ascendens H.B.Baker, 1940
  - Philonesia baldwini (Ancey), 1889
  - Philonesia cicercula (Gould), 1846
    - Philonesia cicercula boettgeriana (Ancey), 1889
  - Philonesia cryptoportica (Gould), 1846
  - Philonesia decepta H.B.Baker, 1940
  - Philonesia fallax H.B.Baker, 1940
    - Philonesia fallax popouwelae H.B.Baker, 1940
  - Philonesia glypha H.B.Baker, 1940
  - Philonesia hartmanni (Ancey), 1889
    - Philonesia hartmanni palehuae H.B.Baker, 1940
  - Philonesia kauaiensis H.B.Baker, 1940
  - Philonesia kualii H.B.Baker, 1940
  - Philonesia konahuanui H.B.Baker, 1940
  - Philonesia maunalei H.B.Baker, 1940
  - Philonesia mokuleiae H.B.Baker, 1940
  - Philonesia oahuensis (Ancey), 1889
    - Philonesia oahuensis depressula (Ancey), 1889
  - Philonesia perlucens (Ancey), 1889
  - Philonesia plicosa (Ancey), 1889
  - Philonesia striata H.B.Baker, 1940
  - Philonesia waimanaloi H.B.Baker, 1940
- Piena Cooke 1940
  - Philonesia grandis H.B.Baker, 1940 – type species
  - Philonesia parva H.B.Baker, 1940
  - Philonesia palawai H.B.Baker, 1940
- Pitcairnia H.B.Baker, 1940
  - Philonesia filiceti Beck, 1940
  - Philonesia mangarevae H.B.Baker, 1940
  - Philonesia pitcairnensis H.B.Baker, 1940 – type species
- Rapafila H.B.Baker, 1940
  - Philonesia tenuior H.B.Baker, 1940
  - Philonesia zimmermani H.B.Baker, 1940 – type species
    - Philonesia zimmermani tautautui H.B.Baker, 1940 – type species
- Uafatua H.B.Baker, 1940
  - Philonesia fusca (Pease), 1868
  - Philonesia helicarion H.B.Baker, 1940 – type species
  - Philonesia obliqua H.B.Baker, 1940
- Waihoua H.B.Baker, 1940
  - Philonesia kaliella H.B.Baker, 1940 – type species
- incertae sedis
  - Philonesia pertenuis (Gould), 1846
