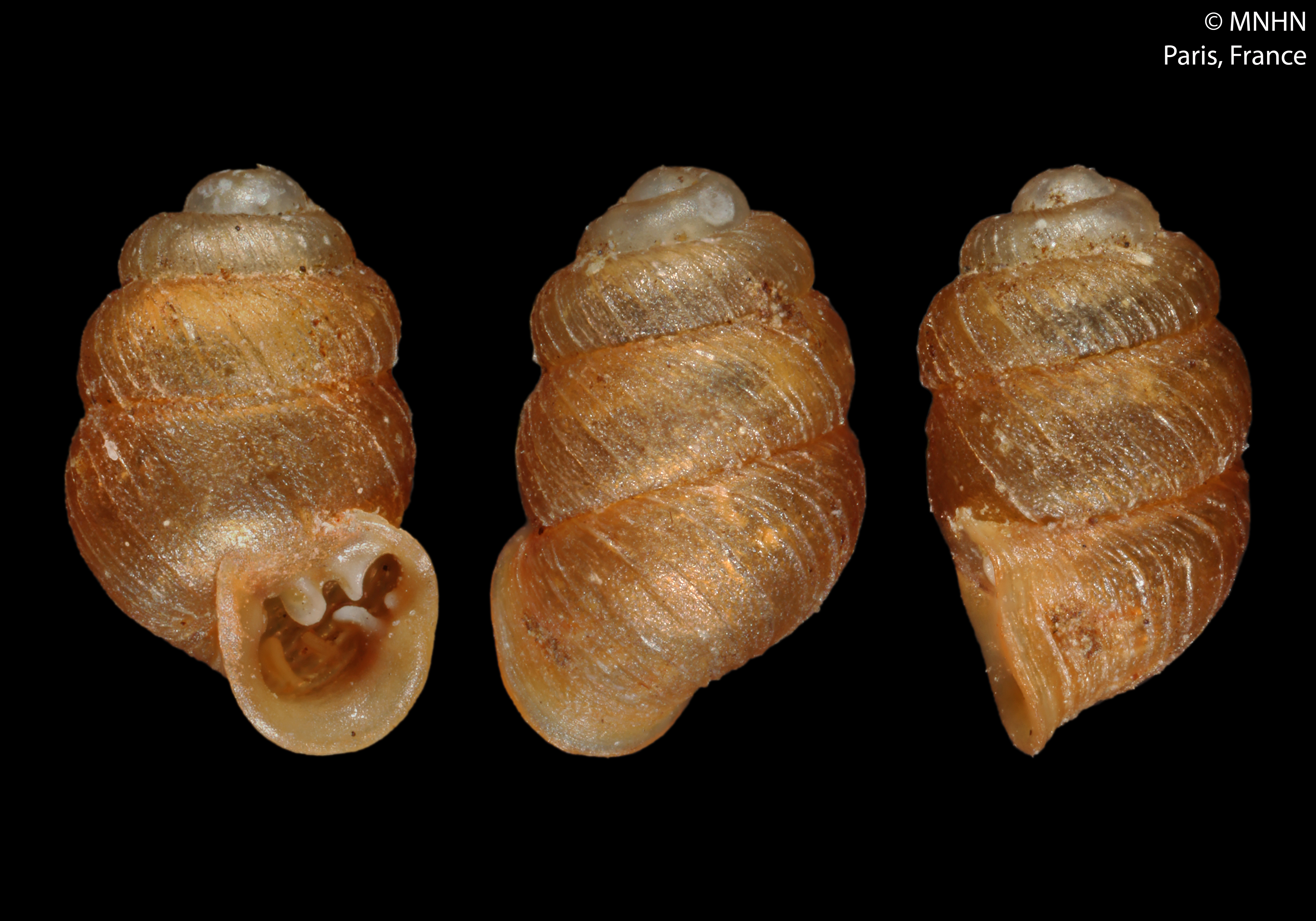
- Shell of Nesopupa paivae (Syntype at MNHN, Paris)

Scientific classification
- Kingdom: Animalia
- Phylum: Mollusca
- Class: Gastropoda
- Order: Stylommatophora
- Infraorder: Pupilloidei
- Superfamily: Pupilloidea
- Family: Vertiginidae
- Genus: Nesopupa; Pilsbry, 1900

Type species
- Pupa (Vertigo) tantilla A. Gould, 1847

Synonyms
- Australbinula (Westralcopta) Iredale, 1939 (junior synonym); Nesopupa (Cocopupa) Pilsbry & C. M. Cooke, 1920· accepted, alternate representation; Nesopupa (Infranesopupa) Cooke & Pilsbry, 1920· accepted, alternate representation; Nesopupa (Limbatipupa) Cooke & Pilsbry, 1920· accepted, alternate representation; Nesopupa (Nesodagys) Cooke & Pilsbry, 1920· accepted, alternate representation; Nesopupa (Nesopupa) Pilsbry, 1900· accepted, alternate representation; Nesopupa (Nesopupilla) Pilsbry & C. M. Cooke, 1920· accepted, alternate representation; Ptychochilus O. Boettger, 1881; Pupa (Pagodella) H. Adams, 1867 (invalid; not Swainson, 1840); Somniopupa Iredale, 1937 (junior synonym); Vertigo (Ptychochilus) O. Boettger, 1881 (Invalid: Placed on the Official Index by Opinion 1823, 1996, Bulletin of Zoological Nomenclature, 53: 53. Nesopupa is an objective synonym); Westralcopta Iredale, 1939 (junior synonym)

= Nesopupa =

Genus of land snails

Nesopupa is a genus of very small air-breathing land snails, terrestrial pulmonate gastropod mollusks in the subfamily Nesopupinae of the family Vertiginidae.

Nesopupa is the type genus of the subfamily Nesopupinae within the Vertiginidae.

== Distribution ==
The distribution of the genus Nesopupa includes Hawaii, Federated States of Micronesia, Palau, Guam, the Cook Islands, Mauritius, Réunion and Saint Helena.

== Species ==
Species within the genus Nesopupa include:

- Nesopupa alloia Cooke & Pilsbry, 1920
- Nesopupa anceyana Cooke & Pilsbry, 1920
- Nesopupa armata (Pease, 1871)
- Nesopupa bacca Pease, 1871 (taxon inquirendum)
- Nesopupa baldwini Ancey, 1904
- Nesopupa bishopi Cooke & Pilsbry, 1920
- Nesopupa cocosensis (Dall, 1900)
- Nesopupa comorensis Pilsbry, 1920
- Nesopupa dentifera (Pease, 1871)
- Nesopupa dispersa Cooke & Pilsbry, 1920
- Nesopupa dubitabilis Cooke & Pilsbry, 1920
- Nesopupa eapensis (Boettger, 1881)
- Nesopupa forbesi Cooke & Pilsbry, 1920
- Nesopupa galapagensis Vagvolgyi, 1974
- Nesopupa godeffroyi (Boettger, 1881)
- Nesopupa gonioplax Pilsbry, 1920
- Nesopupa hackerae Stanisic, 2010
- Nesopupa incerta (G. Nevill, 1870)
- Nesopupa infrequens Cooke & Pilsbry, 1920
- Nesopupa kauaiensis Cooke & Pilsbry, 1920
- Nesopupa limatula Cooke & Pilsbry, 1920
- Nesopupa litoralis Cooke & Pilsbry, 1920
- Nesopupa maaseni Altena, 1975
- Nesopupa madgei Peile, 1936
- Nesopupa mariei (Crosse, 1871)
- Nesopupa micra Pilsbry, 1920
- Nesopupa moellendorffi (O. Boettger, 1890)
- Nesopupa mokaensis Kennard, 1943
- Nesopupa moluccana (O. Boettger, 1891)
- Nesopupa moreleti (A. D. Brown, 1870)
- Nesopupa morini Madge, 1938
- Nesopupa nannodes (Quadras & Möllendorff, 1898)
- Nesopupa newcombi Cooke & Pilsbry, 1920
- Nesopupa novopommerana I. Rensch, 1932
- Nesopupa oahuensis Cooke & Pilsbry, 1920
- Nesopupa paivae (J.C.H. Crosse, 1865)
- Nesopupa pleurophora (Shuttleworth, 1852)
- Nesopupa plicifera Ancey, 1904 (taxon inquirendum)
- Nesopupa ponapica (Möllendorff, 1900)
- Nesopupa proscripta (E. A. Smith, 1905)
- Nesopupa quadrasi (Möllendorff, 1894)
- Nesopupa rarotonga Brook, 2010
- Nesopupa scotti (Brazier, 1875)
- Nesopupa singularis Cooke & Pilsbry, 1920
- Nesopupa subcentralis Cooke & Pilsbry, 1920
- Nesopupa tantilla (A. Gould, 1847)
- Nesopupa tenimberica Haas, 1937
- Nesopupa thaanumi Ancey, 1904
- Nesopupa turtoni Smith, 1892
- Nesopupa vinsoni Madge, 1946
- Nesopupa waianensis Cooke & Pilsbry, 1920
- Nesopupa wesleyana Ancey, 1904
- Nesopupa yamagutii Kuroda, 1941

== Synonyms ==
- Nesopupa bandulana Connolly, 1922: synonym of Vertigo bandulana (Connolly, 1922) (original combination)
- Nesopupa bisulcata (Jickeli, 1873): synonym of Afripupa bisulcata (Jickeli, 1873): synonym of Vertigo bisulcata (Jickeli, 1873) (superseded combination)
- Nesopupa corrugata (Preston, 1912): synonym of Insulipupa corrugata (Preston, 1912)
- Nesopupa decaryi Fischer-Piette & Bedoucha, 1965: synonym of Nesopupa minutalis (Morelet, 1881): synonym of Insulipupa minutalis (Morelet, 1881) (junior synonym)
- Nesopupa dedecora Pilsbry, 1902: synonym of Vertigo (Vertilla) dedecora (Pilsbry, 1902) represented as Vertigo dedecora (Pilsbry, 1902) (original combination)
- Nesopupa densistriata Adam, 1954: synonym of Afripupa densestriata (Adam, 1954) (original combination)
- Nesopupa farquhari Pilsbry, 1917: synonym of Vertigo farquhari Pilsbry, 1917 (original name)
- Nesopupa ganzae W. Adam, 1954: synonym of Insulipupa ganzae W. Adam, 1954 (original combination)
- Nesopupa griqualandica (Melvill & Ponsonby, 1893): synonym of Vertigo griqualandica (Melvill & Ponsonby, 1893) (superseded combination)
- Nesopupa insularis (Dartevelle, 1952): synonym of Insulipupa insularis (Dartevelle, 1952)
- Nesopupa kanongae Adam, 1954: synonym of Afripupa kanongae (Adam, 1954)
- Nesopupa malayana (Issel, 1874): synonym of Insulipupa malayana (Issel, 1874)
- Nesopupa minor (O. Boettger, 1870) †: synonym of Vertigo minor O. Boettger, 1870 † (new combination not accepted)
- Nesopupa minutalis (Morelet, 1881): synonym of Insulipupa minutalis (Morelet, 1881)
- Nesopupa peilei Madge, 1938: synonym of Insulipupa peilei (Madge, 1938) (original combination)
- Nesopupa petiti Fischer-Piette & Vukadinovic, 1971: synonym of Nesopupa minutalis (Morelet, 1881): synonym of Insulipupa minutalis (Morelet, 1881) (junior synonym)
- Nesopupa rodriguezensis Connolly, 1925: synonym of Afripupa rodriguezensis (Connolly, 1925)
- Nesopupa tamagonari Pilsbry & Y. Hirase, 1904: synonym of Vertigo (Vertilla) dedecora (Pilsbry, 1902) represented as Vertigo dedecora (Pilsbry, 1902) (junior synonym)
- Nesopupa vengoensis Connolly, 1925: synonym of Afripupa vengoensis (Connolly, 1925) (original combination)
- Nesopupa ventricosa (H. Adams, 1867): synonym of Nesopupa mokaensis Kennard, 1943 (junior homonym, non Draparnaud, 1801)
- Nesopupa waterloti Fischer-Piette & Bedoucha, 1965: synonym of Nesopupa minutalis (Morelet, 1881): synonym of Insulipupa minutalis (Morelet, 1881) (junior synonym)
