= Nesopupa subcentralis =

Conservation status
- Data Deficient (IUCN 2.3)

Scientific classification
- Kingdom: Animalia
- Phylum: Mollusca
- Class: Gastropoda
- Order: Stylommatophora
- Family: Vertiginidae
- Genus: Nesopupa
- Species: N. subcentralis

Binomial name
- Nesopupa subcentralis Cooke & Pilsbry, 1920

Species of gastropod

Nesopupa subcentralis is a species of very small, air-breathing land snail, a terrestrial pulmonate gastropod mollusk in the family Vertiginidae, the whorl snails. This species is endemic to Hawaii, in the United States.
