= Nesopupa quadrasi =

Conservation status
- Data Deficient (IUCN 2.3)

Scientific classification
- Kingdom: Animalia
- Phylum: Mollusca
- Class: Gastropoda
- Order: Stylommatophora
- Family: Vertiginidae
- Genus: Nesopupa
- Species: N. quadrasi

Binomial name
- Nesopupa quadrasi (Möllendorff, 1894)

Species of gastropod

Nesopupa quadrasi is a species of very small, air-breathing land snail, a terrestrial pulmonate gastropod mollusk in the family Vertiginidae, the whorl snails. This species is endemic to Guam.

== See also ==
List of land snails of the Mariana Islands
