= Advena stoddartii flosculus =

Conservation status
- Extinct (IUCN 2.3)

Scientific classification
- Kingdom: Animalia
- Phylum: Mollusca
- Class: Gastropoda
- Order: Stylommatophora
- Family: Helicarionidae
- Genus: Advena
- Species: A. stoddartii
- Subspecies: A. s. flosculus

Trinomial name
- Advena stoddartii flosculus (J. C. Cox, 1866)

Synonyms
- Helix flosculus J. C. Cox, 1866 superseded combination; Quintalia flosculus (J. C. Cox, 1866) superseded combination

Extinct species of gastropod

Advena stoddartii flosculus is an extinct subspecies of air-breathing land snail or semislug, a terrestrial pulmonate gastropod mollusk in the family Helicarionidae. This species was endemic to Norfolk Island.
