= Ptychalaea =

Scientific classification
- Domain: Eukaryota
- Kingdom: Animalia
- Phylum: Mollusca
- Class: Gastropoda
- Order: Stylommatophora
- Family: Gastrocoptidae
- Genus: †Ptychalaea; Boettger, 1889

Extinct genus of gastropods

Ptychalaea is a fossil genus of very small, air-breathing land snails, terrestrial pulmonate gastropod molluscs in the family Gastrocoptidae.

== Taxonomy ==
The type species of the genus is fossil Ptychalaea flexidens (Reuss, 1861) from Miocene of Europe. In 1920 the extant snails from Japan were placed into Ptychalaea - Nesopupa dedecora Pilsbry, 1902 and its form Nesopupa tamagonari Pilsbry, Hirase, 1904. Japanese species was established under the name Ptychalaea dedecora (Pilsbry, 1902). Although in 2018 it was shown that Nesopupa dedecora and its form Nesopupa tamagonari belong to genus Vertigo (Vertiginidae) and on this basis it was erroneously concluded by J.C. Nekola with coauthors that Ptychalaea is synonym of Vertigo. Although in fact it only means that Nesopupa dedecora is not a species of Ptychalaea and there should be no consequence for taxonomic status of this genus. The type species of Ptychalaea, Ptychalaea flexidens from Miocene of Europe, is probably not related to extant Nesopupa dedecora from Japan.

Fossil species Ptychalaea mystica Stworzewicz & Pokryszko, 2015 from Eocene Baltic amber was also described in this genus.

== Links ==
- MolluscaBase - Ptychalaea
