= Pittoconcha =

Scientific classification
- Kingdom: Animalia
- Phylum: Mollusca
- Class: Gastropoda
- Order: Stylommatophora
- Infraorder: Limacoidei
- Superfamily: Trochomorphoidea
- Family: Microcystidae
- Genus: Pittoconcha; Preston, 1913

Type species
- Pittoconcha concinna Preston, 1913

Genus of gastropods

Pittoconcha is a genus of air-breathing land snails or semislugs, terrestrial pulmonate gastropod mollusks in the family Microcystidae. Its only species is Pittoconcha concinna Preston, 1913, which is considered vulnerable. This species is endemic to Norfolk Island.
