= Fanulena amiculus =

Conservation status
- Endangered (IUCN 2.3)

Scientific classification
- Kingdom: Animalia
- Phylum: Mollusca
- Class: Gastropoda
- Order: Stylommatophora
- Family: Microcystidae
- Genus: Fanulena
- Species: F. amiculus

Binomial name
- Fanulena amiculus (Iredale, 1945)

Synonyms
- Dolapex amiculus Iredale, 1945

Species of gastropod

Fanulena amiculus is a species of air-breathing land snails or semislugs, terrestrial pulmonate gastropod mollusks in the family Microcystidae.

This species is endemic to Norfolk Island.
