= List of non-marine molluscs of the Gambier Islands =

The non-marine molluscs of the Gambier Islands are a part of the molluscan fauna of French Polynesia. There is a high degree of endemism of these species. The gastropod fauna has been affected by severe alterations to the natural environment of the Gambier Islands. 43 of the 46 species of snails that once made the Gambier Islands their homes are now extinct.

== Land gastropods ==
- Assimineidae

- † Cyclomorpha secessa Bouchet & Abdou, 2003 - endemic
- † Omphalotropis margarita (Pfeiffer, 1851) - endemic

- Euconulidae

- † Aukena endodonta Bouchet & Abdou, 2001 - endemic
- † Aukena tridentata (Baker, 1940) - endemic
- Philonesia mangarevae Baker, 1940 - endemic, at the base of Mont Mokoto

== See also ==
- List of non-marine molluscs of the Pitcairn Islands
- List of non-marine molluscs of the Cook Islands
