= Sinployea pitcairnensis =

Conservation status
- Vulnerable (IUCN 2.3)

Scientific classification
- Kingdom: Animalia
- Phylum: Mollusca
- Class: Gastropoda
- Order: Stylommatophora
- Family: Charopidae
- Genus: Sinployea
- Species: S. pitcairnensis

Binomial name
- Sinployea pitcairnensis Preece, 1995

Species of gastropod

Sinployea pitcairnensis is a species of land snail in the family Charopidae. It is endemic to Pitcairn.
