= Bothriopupa tenuidens =

Scientific classification
- Kingdom: Animalia
- Phylum: Mollusca
- Class: Gastropoda
- Order: Stylommatophora
- Family: Vertiginidae
- Genus: Bothriopupa
- Species: B. tenuidens

Binomial name
- Bothriopupa tenuidens (C.B. Adams, 1845)

Species of gastropod

Bothriopupa tenuidens is a species of gastropod belonging to the family Vertiginidae.

The species is found in Central America.
