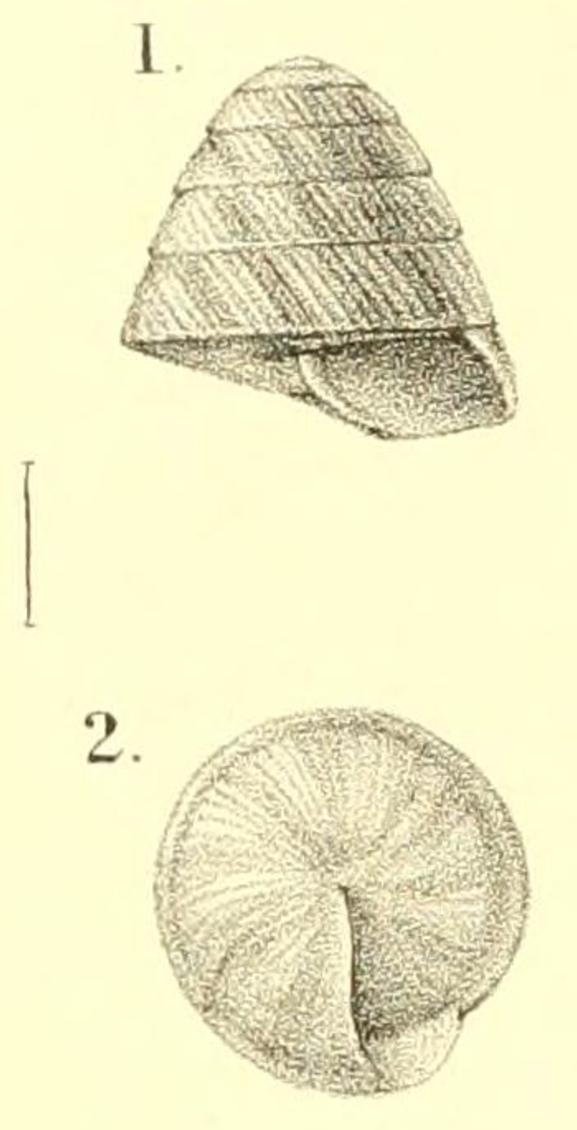
- Fanulena imitatrix

Scientific classification
- Kingdom: Animalia
- Phylum: Mollusca
- Class: Gastropoda
- Order: Stylommatophora
- Family: Microcystidae
- Genus: Fanulena; Iredale, 1945

Synonyms
- Dolapex Iredale, 1945; Lutilodix Iredale, 1945; Parcolena Iredale, 1945

= Fanulena =

Genus of gastropods

Fanulena is a genus of air-breathing land snails or semislugs, terrestrial pulmonate gastropod mollusks in the family Microcystidae.

== Species ==
Species within the genus Fanulena include:

- Fanulena amiculus (Iredale, 1945)
- Fanulena fraterna (Iredale, 1945)
- Fanulena imitatrix (Sykes, 1900)
- Fanulena insculpta (L. Pfeiffer, 1846)
- Fanulena perrugosa Iredale, 1945
- Fanulena testudo (Preston, 1913)
