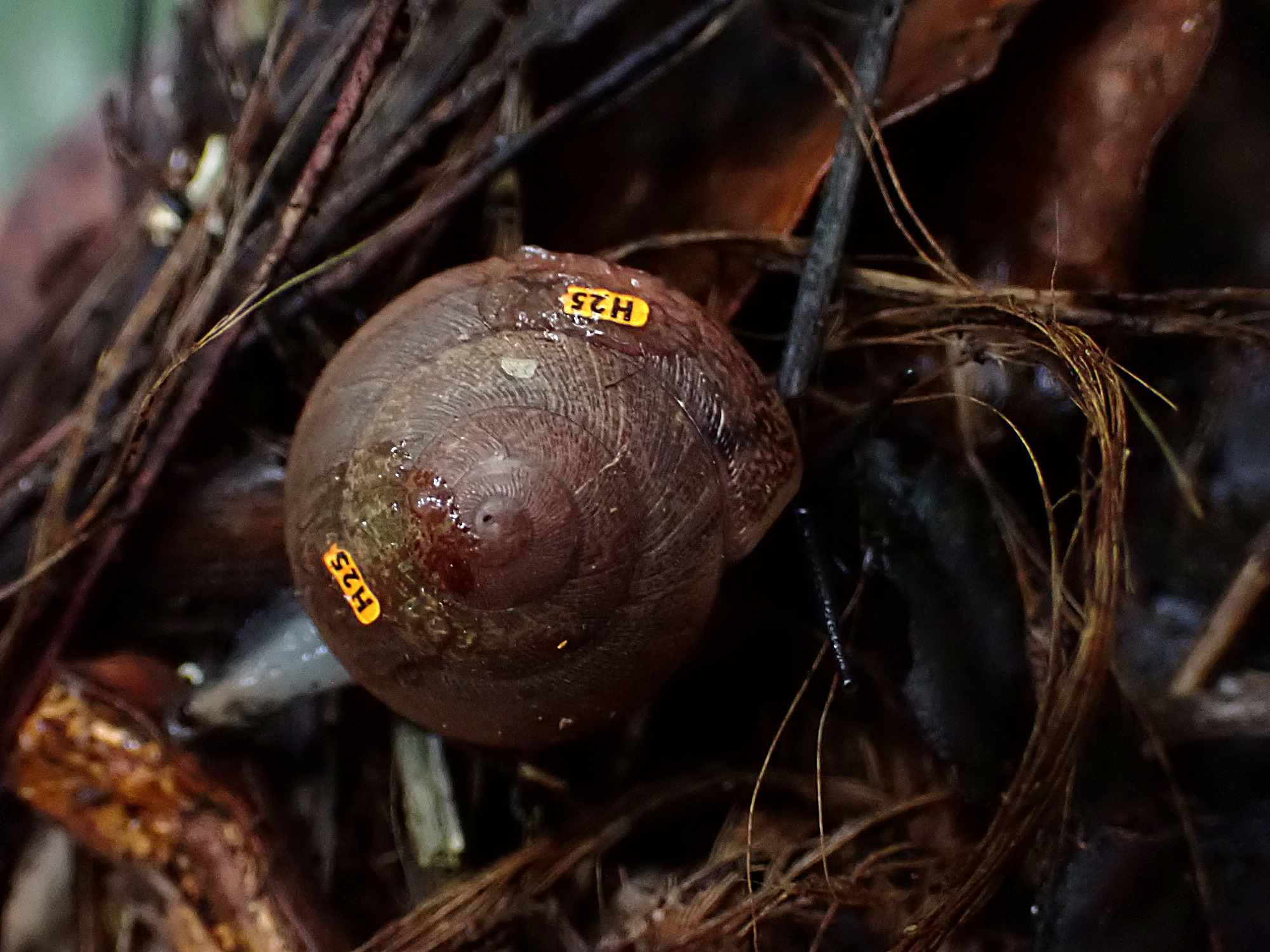
- Tagged specimen of A. campbellii (individual H25) in leaf litter, Norfolk Island National Park

Conservation status
- Critically endangered (EPBC Act)

Scientific classification
- Kingdom: Animalia
- Phylum: Mollusca
- Class: Gastropoda
- Order: Stylommatophora
- Family: Helicarionidae
- Genus: Advena
- Species: A. campbellii

Binomial name
- Advena campbellii (Gray, 1834)
- Location of Norfolk Island

Synonyms
- Helix campbellii Gray, 1834; Helix campbelli Reeve, 1852 (misspelling); Rotula campbelli Sykes, 1900; Advena charon (Sykes, 1900)

= Advena campbellii =

Species of land snail endemic to Norfolk Island

Advena campbellii, commonly known as the Campbell's keeled glass-snail, is a species of air-breathing land snail, a terrestrial pulmonate gastropod mollusc in the family Microcystidae. It is endemic to Norfolk Island, an Australian external territory in the South Pacific Ocean. The species was listed as Extinct by the International Union for Conservation of Nature in 1996, though the Australian Government listed it as Critically Endangered under the Environment Protection and Biodiversity Conservation Act 1999 (EPBC Act) and stated in 2009 that the IUCN status was incorrect and required updating. A living population was rediscovered in 2020 by researchers from the Australian Museum with the assistance of Norfolk Island resident Mark Scott.

== Taxonomy ==
The species was first described by John Edward Gray in 1834 as Helix campbellii, based on a specimen collected from Phillip Island under damp wood. The specific name has frequently been misspelled as campbelli in the literature, including in the IUCN assessment. Advena charon (Sykes, 1900), described from Norfolk Island, is treated as a synonym and is considered to represent the nominotypical subspecies.

The species was historically placed in the family Helicarionidae; however, a comprehensive systematic revision by Hyman, Caiza and Köhler (2023), based on molecular phylogenetic analysis (mitochondrial 16S and COI genes) and comparative morpho-anatomy, confirmed its placement in Microcystidae. Two subspecies are recognised: the nominotypical Advena campbellii campbellii from Norfolk Island, and Advena campbellii nepeanensis Preston, 1913, known only from subfossil shells on Nepean Island.

Phylogenetic analyses place A. campbellii in a clade with its congeners A. suteri from Hundred Acre Reserve and A. grayi from Phillip Island.

== Description ==
Advena campbellii is a medium-sized microcystid snail and the largest species in the genus Advena. The shell width ranges from 3 mm in juveniles to 21 mm in the largest adults, with the most common adult size class being 15–17 mm. The shell is thin and semi-translucent with a glossy surface and weakly sculptured with irregular growth lines. The periphery is angulate, giving rise to the common name "keeled glass-snail".

The reproductive anatomy features an uncoiled penis enclosed in a very thin penial tunica, internally sculptured with two primary longitudinal pilasters. Unlike its relatives A. suteri and A. grayi, A. campbellii lacks a basal penial stimulator. The species is ovoviviparous, giving birth to single live neonates rather than laying eggs. In captivity, it reaches reproductive maturity at approximately 3–4 months of age and has an average lifespan of 10–12 months. Most adults produce single neonates at intervals averaging 13.6 to 20.5 days.

== Distribution and habitat ==
Advena campbellii is endemic to the Norfolk Island group. Historically, the nominotypical subspecies was more widely distributed across Norfolk Island, with subfossil records indicating a broader former range. The subspecies A. c. nepeanensis is known only from subfossil material collected on Nepean Island.

The extant population of A. c. campbellii is restricted to several sites in moist palm valley forest within the Norfolk Island National Park, near Mount Pitt. The species appears to require intact native palm valleys and adjacent hardwood forest, suggesting that historical land clearing and the spread of invasive weeds have significantly restricted its range.

Snails shelter in leaf litter and beneath palm fronds on the forest floor. Surveys between 2020 and 2022 recorded increasing numbers: from 21 individuals in March 2020 to 197 in May 2022, partly reflecting the discovery of additional sub-populations by Norfolk Island National Park staff and the end of a severe drought period. Quarterly monitoring revealed that adult abundance is strongly correlated with monthly rainfall (correlation coefficient 0.80), with higher counts from April to July and lower counts in January and November.

== Threats ==
The principal threats to A. campbellii are introduced predators and habitat degradation. Black rats and Polynesian rats are significant predators; rodent-predated shells showing characteristic bite marks were found throughout the study period, with the proportion of predated empty shells averaging 14% across surveys. Feral chickens are also a potential predator and source of habitat disturbance. Introduced flatworms, including the blue garden flatworm, are another potential predator for which no control methods currently exist.

Habitat loss from historical clearing of native subtropical rainforest, invasive weeds (particularly cherry guava and African olive), and climate change also threaten the species. Norfolk Island is experiencing increasingly drier weather and more extreme rainfall events, with El Niño events bringing reduced rainfall and higher temperatures.

== Conservation ==
=== Rediscovery ===
In March 2020, researchers Isabel Hyman and Frank Köhler from the Australian Museum undertook the first targeted land snail survey on Norfolk Island in many years. During this survey, A. campbellii was recorded alive, drawn to the researchers' attention by Norfolk Island resident Mark Scott. At the time, fewer than 25 living specimens were observed in a single, very small area. The rediscovery of a species listed as Extinct by the IUCN triggered the formation of a multi-institutional conservation alliance comprising the Australian Museum, Taronga Conservation Society Australia, Parks Australia, and the Norfolk Island Regional Council.

=== Ex-situ breeding ===
In May 2021, 16 living individuals were collected and transferred to Taronga Zoo in Sydney to establish a captive insurance population. An additional 30 individuals were collected in May 2022. Although initial breeding rates were high, significant adult mortality followed, attributed to unsuitable husbandry conditions. Through a process of iterative adjustment — including changes to food presentation (ground finer and spread on soft surfaces), reduced humidity (70–90%), natural lighting cycles, provision of palm frond hides, mixed-age housing, minimal handling, and gentler tank cleaning — the population was stabilised.

By March 2024, the captive population had reached approximately 100 individuals and the seventh captive-bred generation. By August 2024, numbers had exceeded 400. Survivorship of young improved from 9.5% (June 2022 – May 2023) to 33.1% (June 2023 – March 2024).

In May 2025, the first reintroduction of captive-bred snails to Norfolk Island was undertaken, with 340 individuals released at a site selected for its similarity in vegetation, temperature and humidity to the wild population. Sprinkler systems were installed to reduce drought risk, and post-release monitoring including mark–recapture and dispersal studies is ongoing.

=== In-situ conservation ===
In-situ conservation measures at the Norfolk Island National Park include enhanced predator control through deployment of GoodNature A24 rat and mouse traps and rodent baiting, as well as chicken culling by shooting. Twenty-one rats were killed at the main A. campbellii site during the study period.

Predator-proof exclosures (wooden frames covered with 5 mm metal mesh, 90 × 90 × 30 cm) were trialled to protect breeding adults while allowing neonates to disperse through the mesh. The exclosures successfully retained adults and excluded predators, and breeding was observed within them. However, mortality of enclosed snails suggested that the exclosures require further refinement, particularly regarding the frequency of leaf litter replenishment for food.

Ongoing quarterly monitoring of the wild population continues, and the conservation alliance is planning further reintroductions and population genetic studies.
