= Innesoconcha catletti =

Scientific classification
- Kingdom: Animalia
- Phylum: Mollusca
- Class: Gastropoda
- Order: Stylommatophora
- Superfamily: Trochomorphoidea
- Family: Microcystidae
- Genus: Innesoconcha
- Species: I. catletti

Binomial name
- Innesoconcha catletti (Brazier, 1872)
- Location of Lord Howe Island

Synonyms
- Helix (Microcystis) catletti Brazier, 1872; Microcystis catletti var. major Hedley, 1891; Microcystis catletti subconica Iredale, 1944

Species of land snail

Innesoconcha catletti, also known as the Catlett's yellow glass-snail, is a species of land snail that is endemic to Australia's Lord Howe Island in the Tasman Sea.

== Description ==
The depressedly trochoidal shell of the mature snail is 4.3–6.8 mm in height, with a diameter of 8.6–11.8 mm, yellow-brown in colour. The whorls are flattened above and rounded below, with weakly impressed sutures. It has an ovately lunate aperture and closed umbilicus. The animal is beige to pale grey, with a cream sole, pink head and dark grey eyestalks.

== Distribution and habitat ==
The snail is widespread and common in the lowlands and lower slopes of the southern mountains of the island, where it is found in moist woodland and rainforest, in leaf litter and the leaf sheaths of palms.
