= Propupa =

Propupa Temporal range: Eocene

Scientific classification
- Kingdom: Animalia
- Phylum: Mollusca
- Class: Gastropoda
- Order: Stylommatophora
- Family: Vertiginidae
- Genus: †Propupa; Stworzewicz & Pokryszko, 2006
- Species: †P. hoffeinsorum

Binomial name
- †Propupa hoffeinsorum Stworzewicz & Pokryszko, 2006

Extinct genus of gastropods

Propupa is an extinct genus of air-breathing land snail, a terrestrial pulmonate gastropod mollusk in the superfamily Pupilloidea. Propupa hoffeinsorum is the only species in the genus Propupa, and was described from a fossil found in Baltic amber in 2006.
