= Cylindrovertilla =

Scientific classification
- Kingdom: Animalia
- Phylum: Mollusca
- Class: Gastropoda
- Order: Stylommatophora
- Family: Vertiginidae
- Genus: Cylindrovertilla; O. Boettger, 1880

Genus of gastropods

Cylindrovertilla is a genus of minute, air-breathing land snails, terrestrial pulmonate gastropod molluscs or micromolluscs in the family Vertiginidae, the whorl snails.

== Species ==
Species within the genus Cylindrovertilla include:

- Cylindrovertilla kingi (Cox, 1864)
