= Allenoconcha =

Scientific classification
- Kingdom: Animalia
- Phylum: Mollusca
- Class: Gastropoda
- Order: Stylommatophora
- Infraorder: Limacoidei
- Superfamily: Trochomorphoidea
- Family: Microcystidae
- Genus: Allenoconcha; Preston, 1913

Type species
- Allenoconcha basispiralis Preston, 1913

Genus of molluscs

Allenoconcha is a genus of air-breathing land snails or semi-slugs, terrestrial pulmonate gastropod mollusks in the family Microcystidae.

== Species ==
- Allenoconcha basispiralis Preston, 1913
- Allenoconcha belli Preston, 1913
- Allenoconcha caloraphe Preston, 1913
- Allenoconcha evansorum Hyman & Köhler, 2023
- Allenoconcha margaretae Hyman & Köhler, 2023
- Allenoconcha patescens (J. C. Cox, 1870)
- Allenoconcha perdepressa Preston, 1913
- Allenoconcha platysoma (Sykes, 1900)
- Allenoconcha quintalae (J. C. Cox, 1870)
- Allenoconcha retinaculum (Preston, 1913)
- Allenoconcha royana Preston, 1913
- Allenoconcha varmani Hyman & Köhler, 2023

Species brought into synonymy

- Allenoconcha belli Preston, 1913: synonym of Allenoconcha basispiralis Preston, 1913 (junior synonym)
- Allenoconcha congener Preston, 1913: synonym of Allenoconcha basispiralis Preston, 1913 (junior synonym)
- Allenoconcha mathewsi Preston, 1913: synonym of Allenoconcha basispiralis Preston, 1913 (junior synonym)
- Allenoconcha monspittensis Preston, 1913: synonym of Allenoconcha basispiralis Preston, 1913 (junior synonym)
- Allenoconcha royana Preston, 1913: synonym of Allenoconcha basispiralis Preston, 1913 (junior synonym)
