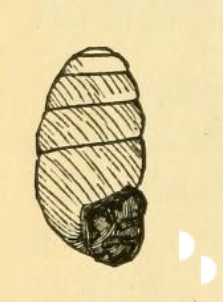
- Original drawing of a shell

Conservation status
- Near Threatened (IUCN 2.3)

Scientific classification
- Domain: Eukaryota
- Kingdom: Animalia
- Phylum: Mollusca
- Class: Gastropoda
- Order: Stylommatophora
- Family: Vertiginidae
- Subfamily: Vertigininae
- Genus: Vertigo
- Species: V. clementina

Binomial name
- Vertigo clementina (Sterki, 1890)

Synonyms
- Bifidaria clementina (Sterki, 1890); Bifidaria clementina oldroydi Vanatta, 1916; Bifidaria clementina var. oldroydae Vanatta, 1916; Pupa clementina Sterki, 1890 (original name); Sterkia (Metasterkia) clementina (Sterki, 1890) superseded combination; Sterkia clementina (Sterki, 1890); Vertigo (Staurodon) clementina (Sterki, 1890) · alternate representation

= Vertigo clementina =

Species of gastropod

The insular birddrop or San Clemente Island blunt-top snail, scientific name Vertigo clementina, is a species of small, air-breathing land snail, a terrestrial gastropod mollusk in the family Vertiginidae. (Incorrectly placed within Chondrinidae in the 2006 IUCN Red List.)

== Description ==
(Original description) The shell is very minute, narrowly perforate and cylindrical. It is pale horn colored, transparent, with rather obtuse apex. The shell contains 5½ whorls, regularly increasing and moderately rounded. They contain a rather deep suture. The shell is smooth, with few microscopic striae, somewhat shining. The body whorl occupies rather more than two-fifths of the length of the shell and is somewhat ascending to the aperture, with a slight, revolving impression on the middle of its last half, ending at the auricle. There is a very slight, flat, crest-elevation near the margin, only in the lower part. The aperture is lateral, scarcely oblique, subovate with the palatal margin slightly flattened, the upper part of same somewhat sinuous. The peristome is a little expanded with a slightly thickened outer lip just at the margin. The shell contains six white lamellae: two on the apertural wall, the apertural, typical, and a rather long supra-apertural, ending in a callus at the upper termination of the palatal margin. The horizontal columellar margin is typical. The basal is very small, nodule-like and deep seated. The two palatals are typical, the inferior a little longer.

== Distribution ==
This species is endemic to the State of California, U.S.A. The survival of this species is "near threatened".
