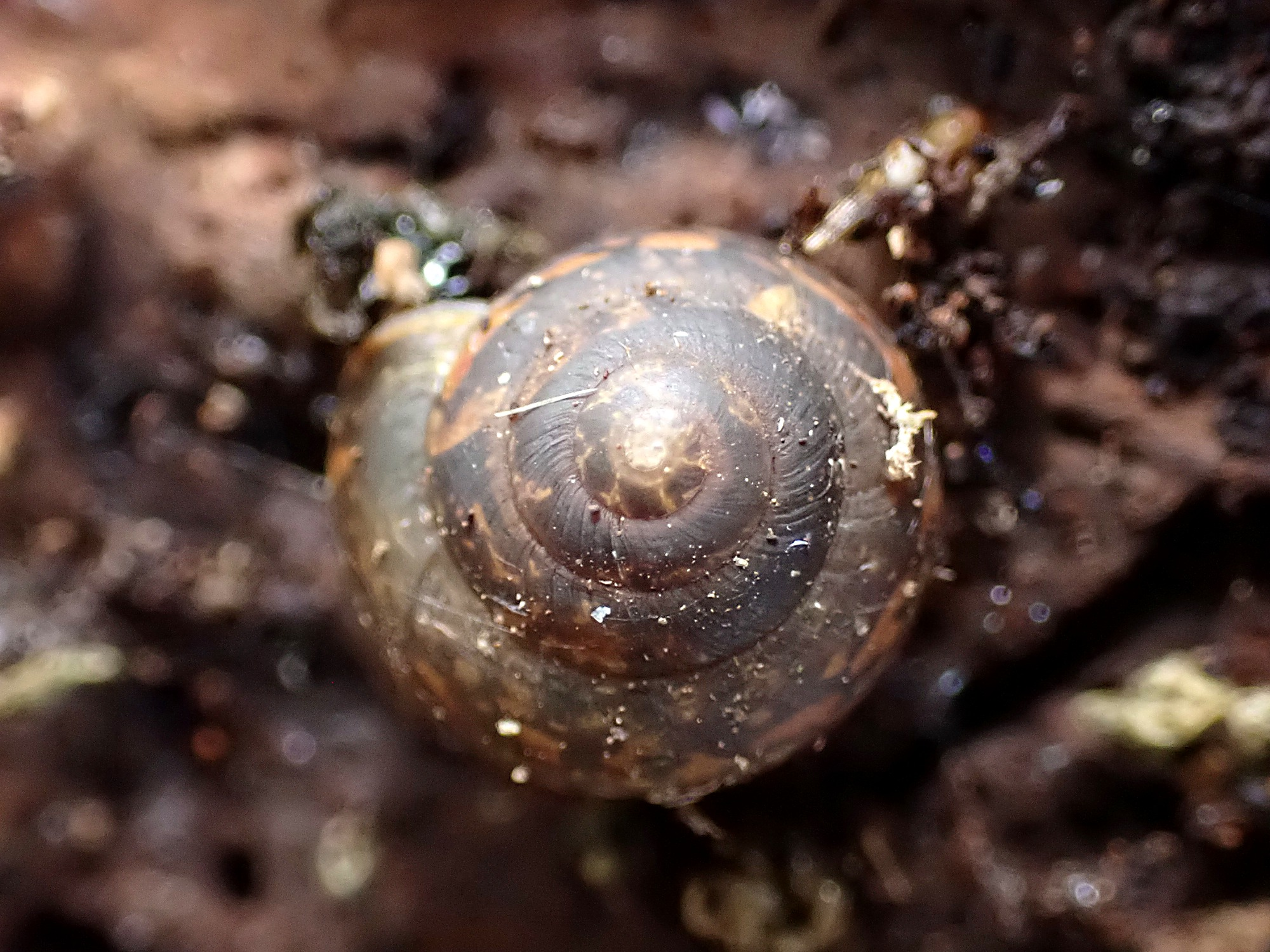
- Dorsal view of the shell at Hundred Acre Reserve, Norfolk Island

Conservation status
- Critically endangered (EPBC Act)

Scientific classification
- Kingdom: Animalia
- Phylum: Mollusca
- Class: Gastropoda
- Order: Stylommatophora
- Family: Helicarionidae
- Genus: Advena
- Species: A. suteri

Binomial name
- Advena suteri (Sykes, 1900)

Synonyms
- Fretum suteri Sykes, 1900; Mathewsoconcha albocincta Preston, 1913; Mathewsoconcha belli Preston, 1913; Belloconcha compacta Preston, 1913; Belloconcha norfolkensis Preston, 1913; Mathewsoconcha vexillum Preston, 1913; Mathewsoconcha suteri (Sykes, 1900); Belloconcha suteri H. B. Preston

= Advena suteri =

Species of land snail

Advena suteri, commonly known as Suter's striped glass-snail, is a species of small air-breathing land snail, a terrestrial pulmonate gastropod mollusc in the family Microcystidae. It is endemic to Norfolk Island, an Australian external territory in the South Pacific Ocean. The species is listed as Critically Endangered under Australia's Environment Protection and Biodiversity Conservation Act 1999 (EPBC Act) and was previously listed as Endangered on the IUCN Red List. It is currently known from a single wild population in Hundred Acre Reserve on Norfolk Island.

== Taxonomy ==
The species was first described by E. R. Sykes in 1900 as Fretum suteri, based on specimens from Norfolk Island. The genus Fretum has since been synonymised with Orpiella. Tom Iredale (1945) transferred the species to Mathewsoconcha, where it was known as Mathewsoconcha suteri for many decades.

In a comprehensive systematic revision by Hyman, Caiza and Köhler (2023), the species was transferred to the genus Advena based on molecular phylogenetic analysis (mitochondrial 16S and COI genes) and comparative morpho-anatomy. This revision also synonymised several previously recognised species and genera with A. suteri, including Mathewsoconcha albocincta, M. belli, M. vexillum, Belloconcha compacta, and Belloconcha norfolkensis, all described by H. B. Preston in 1913.

Phylogenetic analyses place A. suteri in a clade with its congeners A. grayi from Phillip Island and A. campbellii from the Norfolk Island National Park. The three species were distinguished based on significant differences in shell shape and minor differences in reproductive anatomy.

== Description ==
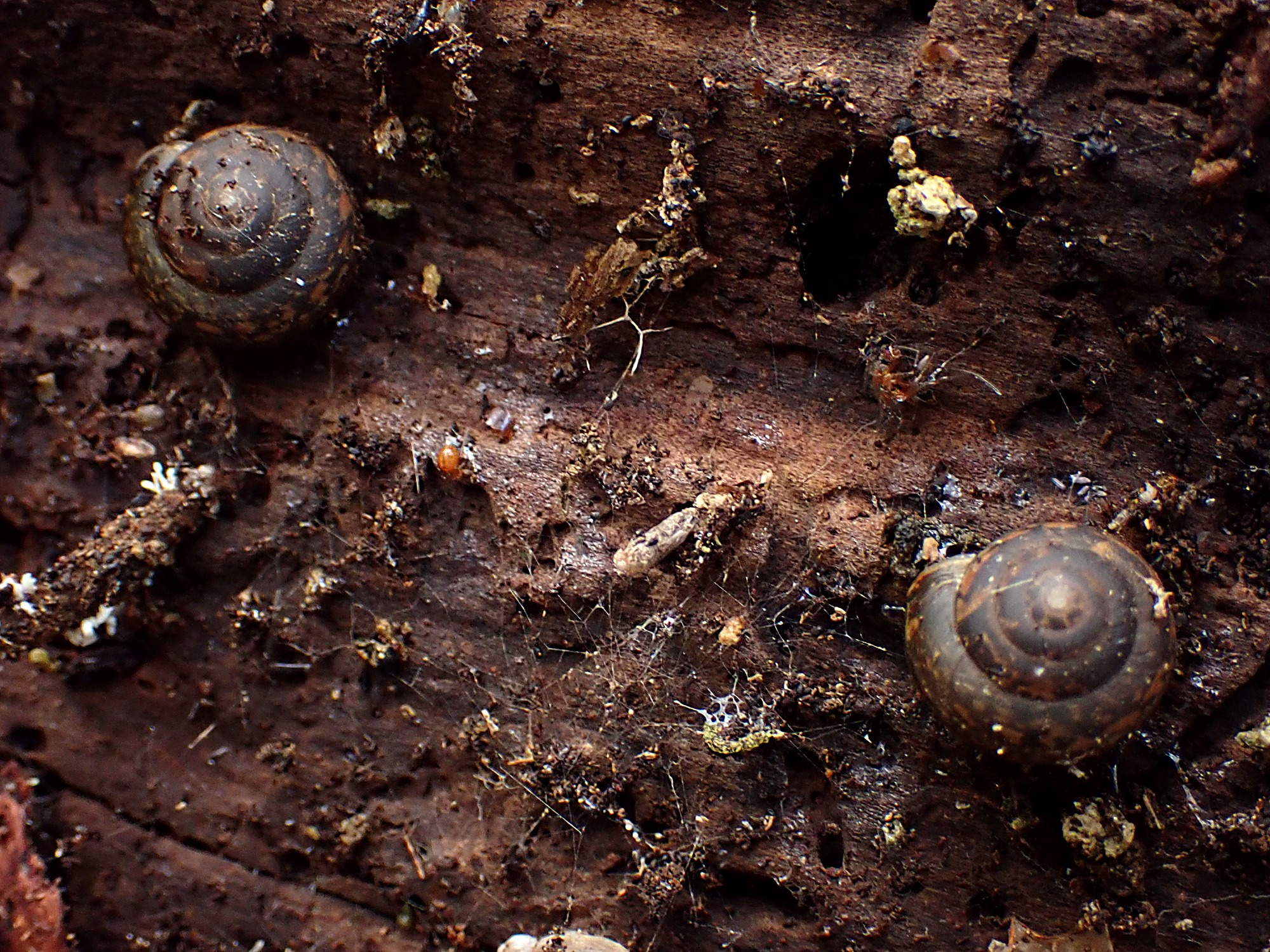
Two specimens on decaying bark at Hundred Acre Reserve, Norfolk Island

Advena suteri is a small to medium-sized microcystid snail. The shell is globose to subglobose, with approximately 4.3–5.4 whorls and a shell width of approximately 9–15 mm in adults. The holotype has a shell width of 11 mm and shell height of 8.3 mm. The shell is thin and semi-translucent with a glossy surface, weakly sculptured with fine irregular growth lines. The periphery is rounded to weakly angulate. The aperture is relatively large and lunate.

Shell coloration is typically brown to dark olive-brown, sometimes with a paler peripheral band (the feature that gave rise to the synonym Mathewsoconcha albocincta, meaning "white-banded"). The species can be distinguished from the larger A. campbellii (shell width up to 21 mm) by its smaller size and slightly different shell proportions.

The reproductive anatomy features an uncoiled penis enclosed in a very thin penial tunica, internally sculptured with two primary longitudinal pilasters and a basal penial stimulator. The species is ovoviviparous, giving birth to live neonates rather than laying eggs.

== Distribution and habitat ==
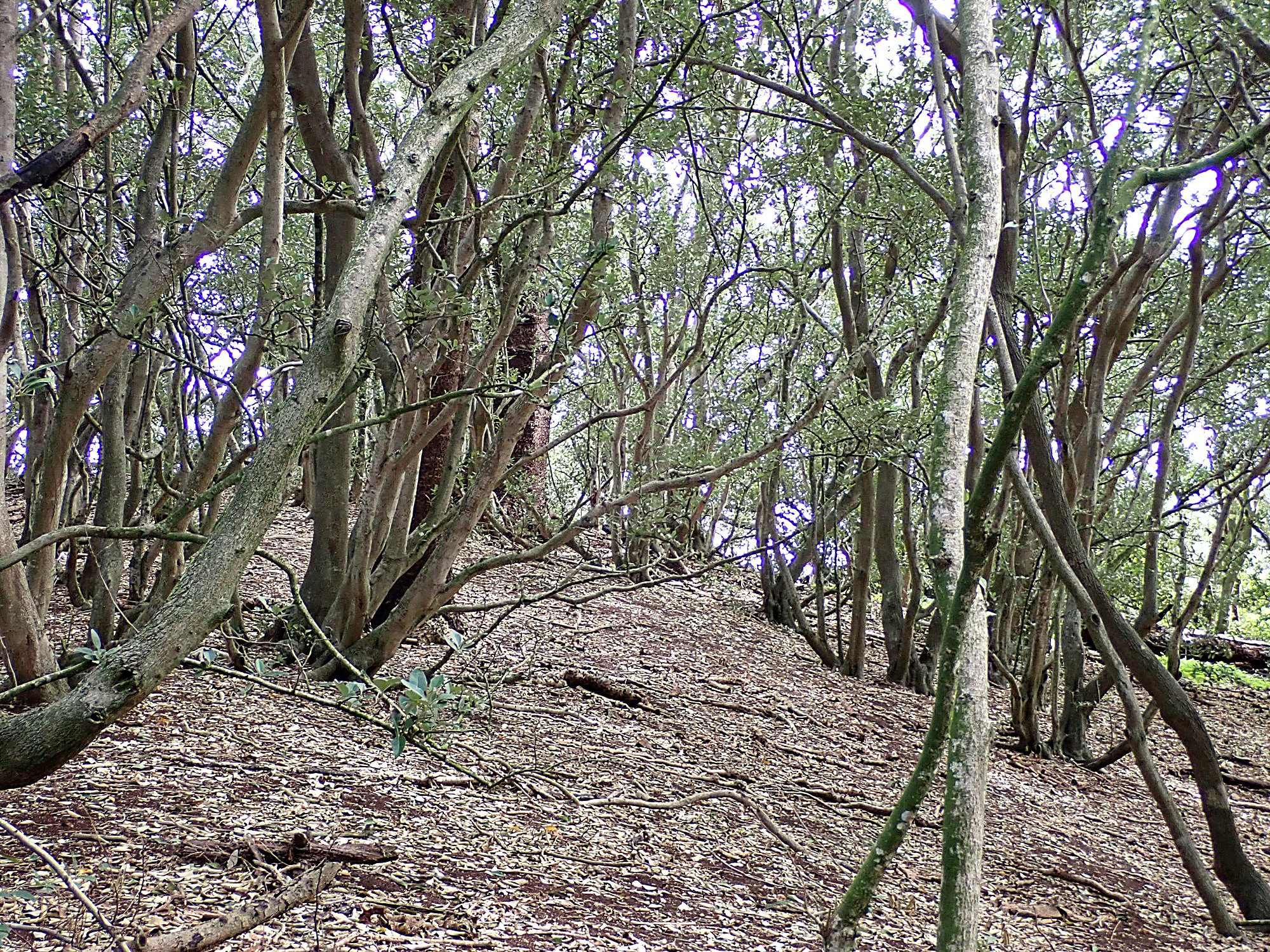
Coastal pine and white oak forest at Hundred Acre Reserve, the habitat of A. suteri

Advena suteri is endemic to Norfolk Island, a small volcanic island in the South Pacific Ocean, approximately 1,500 km (930 mi) east of mainland Australia. Historically, the species was more widely distributed across the island. Subfossil shells have also been recorded from Nepean Island, a tiny satellite island immediately south of Norfolk Island.

As of 2024, the only known extant population is in Hundred Acre Reserve, on the southern coast of Norfolk Island, where the species inhabits open coastal pine (Araucaria heterophylla) and white oak forest. This habitat contrasts with that of its close relative A. campbellii, which inhabits moist palm valley forest in the Norfolk Island National Park.

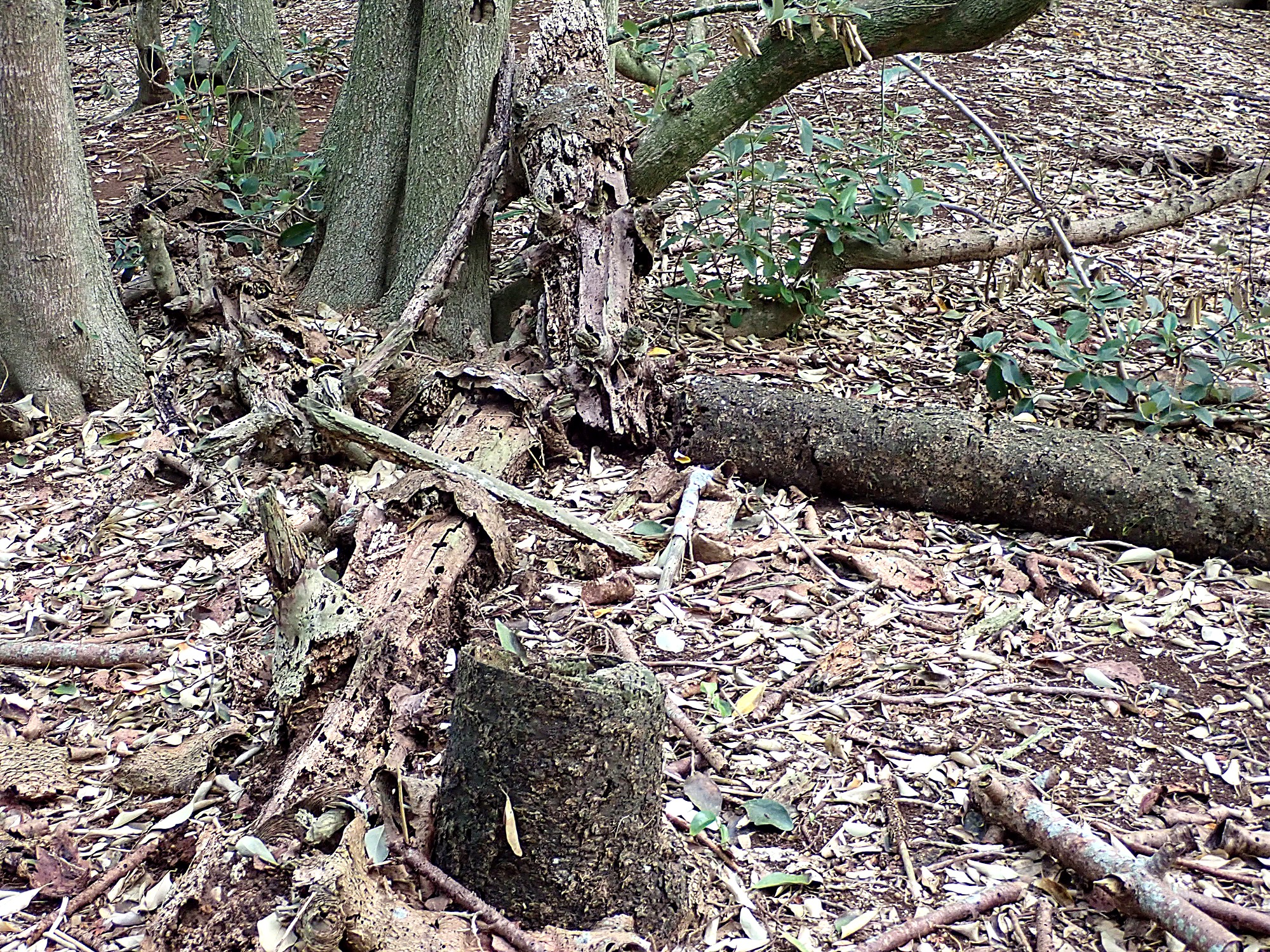
Coarse woody debris providing shelter for A. suteri at Hundred Acre Reserve

Snails are typically found sheltering beneath logs and coarse woody debris on the forest floor. Surveys between 2020 and 2022 recorded increasing numbers of living individuals, from just 2 specimens in March 2020 to 165 in November 2022, likely reflecting improved survey effort and the end of a severe drought period (January 2020 was the driest month on record for Norfolk Island).

== Ecology ==
Like other Norfolk Island microcystids, A. suteri is believed to feed primarily on biofilm and decaying organic matter from leaf litter. The species is ground-dwelling, sheltering under logs and within leaf litter during the day. Field observations and exclosure trials suggest that the species requires regular replenishment of fresh detritus for food.

The species is ovoviviparous, producing single live neonates. In captivity, the closely related A. campbellii was found to reach reproductive maturity at 3–4 months and have a lifespan of 10–12 months; comparable data for A. suteri in the wild are not yet available. The proportion of juveniles (shell width below 15 mm) in wild populations ranged from 27% to 45% across survey periods, suggesting active recruitment.

== Conservation ==
=== Threats ===
The principal threats to A. suteri are introduced predators and habitat degradation. Norfolk Island supports populations of black rats, Polynesian rats, and feral chickens, all of which may prey on land snails. Over 100 chickens were culled from the A. suteri and A. campbellii sites between November 2021 and June 2022, with the majority (97) being culled at Hundred Acre Reserve. Introduced flatworms, including the blue garden flatworm, are another potential predator for which no control methods currently exist.

Habitat loss from historical clearing of native vegetation, invasive weeds, and climate change also threaten the species. Norfolk Island is experiencing increasingly drier weather and more extreme rainfall events, with El Niño events bringing reduced rainfall and higher temperatures. Given that the species is restricted to a single known location, any catastrophic event could potentially lead to its extinction.

=== Ex-situ breeding ===
In May 2021, 16 living individuals of A. suteri were collected and transferred to Taronga Zoo in Sydney to establish a captive insurance population alongside the related A. campbellii. Despite initial successful breeding (averaging 5.6 neonates per week in the first 20 weeks), the A. suteri population did not recover from early husbandry challenges and all captive individuals eventually died. The husbandry team made numerous adjustments to diet, humidity, tank cleaning, and handling protocols based on lessons learned, which proved successful for A. campbellii but were insufficient to sustain A. suteri. Future plans include potentially re-attempting captive rearing of the species.

=== In-situ conservation ===
Several in-situ conservation measures have been implemented at Hundred Acre Reserve. These include enhanced predator control through rodent baiting (a network of 60 bait stations spaced 40 m apart) and chicken culling, as well as habitat enhancement through the addition of piles of small logs of Norfolk Island pine to provide additional shelter sites. Subsequent surveys confirmed that snails were actively using these artificial log piles.

Predator-proof exclosures (wooden frames covered with 5 mm metal mesh, 90 × 90 × 30 cm) were also trialled. While the exclosures successfully retained adult snails and excluded predators, and breeding was observed within them, the approach proved to require frequent maintenance — particularly the regular replenishment of leaf litter for food — making long-term implementation challenging for this biofilm-feeding species.

Ongoing quarterly monitoring of the wild population has been established, and a multi-institutional alliance comprising the Australian Museum, Taronga Conservation Society Australia, Parks Australia, and the Norfolk Island Regional Council continues to coordinate conservation efforts.
