= Bothriopupa =

Scientific classification
- Kingdom: Animalia
- Phylum: Mollusca
- Class: Gastropoda
- Order: Stylommatophora
- Family: Vertiginidae
- Genus: Bothriopupa; Pilsbry, 1898

Genus of land snails

Bothriopupa is a genus of gastropods belonging to the family Vertiginidae.

The species of this genus are found in Central and Southern America.

Species:

- Bothriopupa breviconus Pilsbry, 1917
- Bothriopupa conoidea (L.Pfeiffer, 1853)
- Bothriopupa leucodon (Morelet, 1851)
- Bothriopupa peruviana Pilsbry, 1934
- Bothriopupa tenuidens (C.B.Adams, 1845)
- Bothriopupa variolosa (Gould, 1848)
