= Kaala subrutila =

Scientific classification
- Kingdom: Animalia
- Phylum: Mollusca
- Class: Gastropoda
- Order: Stylommatophora
- Family: Microcystidae
- Genus: Kaala; C. M. Cooke, 1940
- Species: K. subrutila

Binomial name
- Kaala subrutila (Mighels, 1845)

Species of land snail

Kaala subrutila is a terrestrial pulmonate gastropod in the family Microcystidae endemic to Hawaii. Kaala subrutila is the only species in the genus Kaala. The species is one of Hawaii's nine state snails.

== Description ==
Kaala subrutila is brown and the shell is glossy and translucent. Kaala subrutila may be confused with Oxychilus alliarius because they look similar and they live in the same area. Kaala subrutila is extremely rare.

== Distribution and habitat ==
Kaala subrutila is endemic to Oahu, Hawaii. Kaala subrutila is found at the highest point on Mount Kaala, which is 4,025 feet tall. Kaala subrutila lives in a wet, foggy, and windy environment. It is found near ferns or shrubs.

== Conservation status ==
Kaala subrutila is near vulnerable. Some of its predators are rodents, Euglandina rosea, and Oxychilus alliarius.
