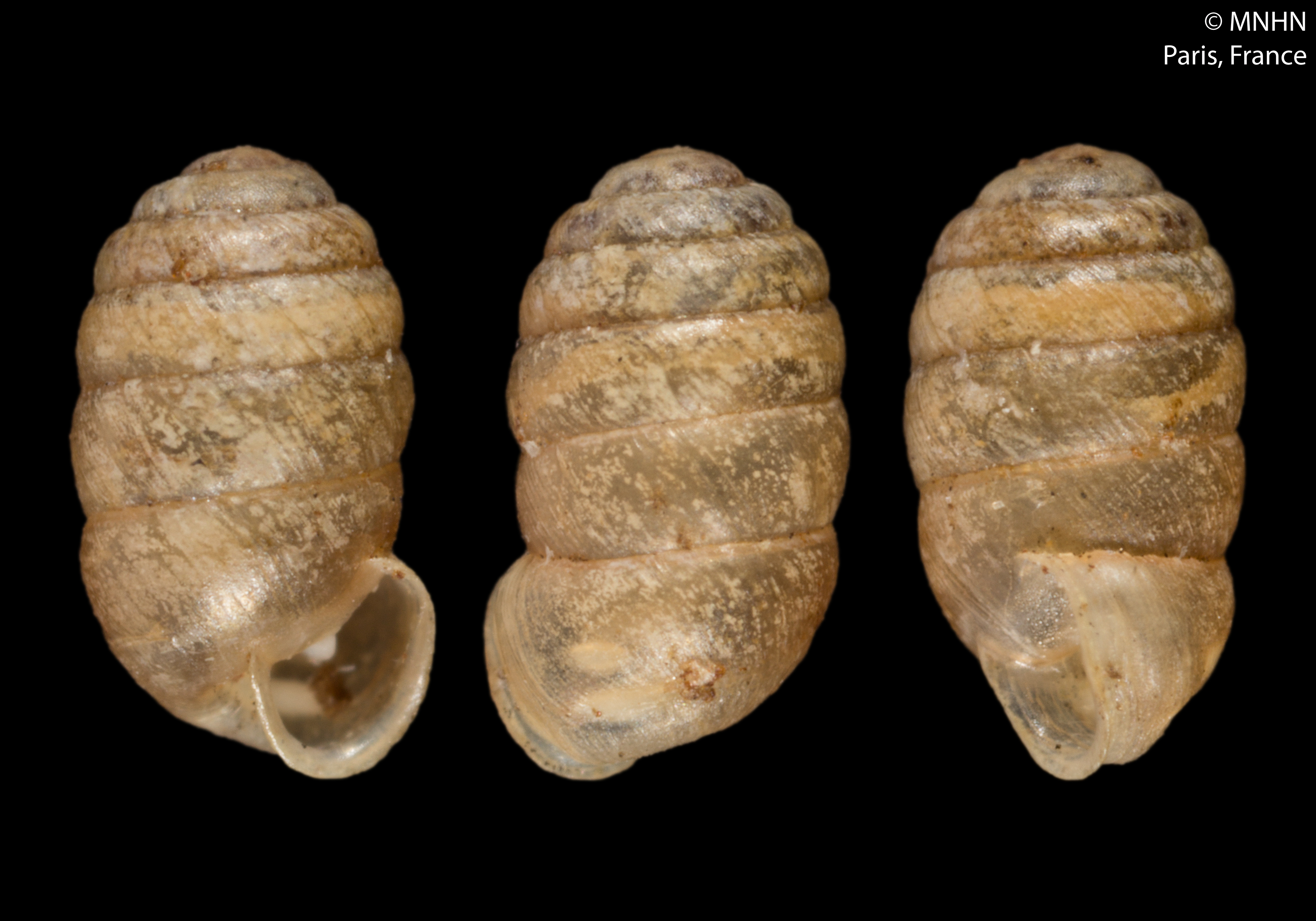
- Shell of Costigo desmazuresi (syntype at MNHN, Paris)

Scientific classification
- Domain: Eukaryota
- Kingdom: Animalia
- Phylum: Mollusca
- Class: Gastropoda
- Order: Stylommatophora
- Family: Vertiginidae
- Genus: Costigo; O. Boettger, 1891

Type species
- Vertigo saparuana Boettger, 1891

Synonyms
- Vertigo (Costigo) O. Boettger, 1891 (original rank)

= Costigo =

Genus of gastropods

Costigo is a genus of minute, air-breathing land snails, terrestrial pulmonate gastropod molluscs or micromolluscs in the family Vertiginidae, the whorl snails.

== Species ==
Species within the genus Costigo include:

- Costigo calamianica (Möllendorff, 1898)
- Costigo desmazuresi (Crosse, 1873)
- Costigo saparuana (Boettger, 1891)

Species brought into synonymy

- Costigo borbonica (H. Adams, 1868): synonym of Gibbulinopsis pupula (Deshayes, 1863) (junior synonym)
- Costigo moleculina van Benthem Jutting, 1940: synonym of Pupisoma moleculina (van Benthem Jutting, 1940) (original combination)
- Costigo pulvisculum (Issel, 1874): synonym of Pupisoma pulvisculum (Issel, 1874) (superseded combination)
