= Innesoconcha =

Scientific classification
- Kingdom: Animalia
- Phylum: Mollusca
- Class: Gastropoda
- Order: Stylommatophora
- Infraorder: Limacoidei
- Superfamily: Trochomorphoidea
- Family: Microcystidae
- Genus: Innesoconcha; Iredale, 1944

Type species
- Innesoconcha catletti (Brazier, 1872)
- Location of Lord Howe Island

Genus of land snails

Innesoconcha is a genus of four species of tiny glass-snails that are endemic to Australia's Lord Howe Island in the Tasman Sea.

== Species ==
- Innesoconcha aberrans Iredale, 1944 – black face glass-snail
- Innesoconcha catletti (Brazier, 1872) – Catlett's yellow glass-snail
- Innesoconcha delecta (Iredale, 1944)
- Innesoconcha doppelganger Hyman & Köhler, 2022
- Innesoconcha flavescens (Iredale, 1944)
- Innesoconcha grata (Iredale, 1944)
- Innesoconcha miranda (Iredale, 1944)
- Innesoconcha prensa (Iredale, 1944)
- Innesoconcha princeps Iredale, 1944 – banded golden glass-snail
- Innesoconcha rosacea (Iredale, 1944)
- Innesoconcha segna Iredale, 1944 – pale glass-snail
