= Philonesia pitcairnensis =

Conservation status
- Vulnerable (IUCN 2.3)

Scientific classification
- Kingdom: Animalia
- Phylum: Mollusca
- Class: Gastropoda
- Order: Stylommatophora
- Family: Euconulidae
- Genus: Philonesia
- Species: P. pitcairnensis

Binomial name
- Philonesia pitcairnensis Baker, 1838

Species of gastropod

Philonesia pitcairnensis is a species of air-breathing land snail or semislug, a terrestrial pulmonate gastropod mollusc in the family Euconulidae. This species is endemic to Pitcairn.
