= Vertigo dedecora =

Scientific classification
- Kingdom: Animalia
- Phylum: Mollusca
- Class: Gastropoda
- Order: Stylommatophora
- Family: Vertiginidae
- Subfamily: Vertigininae
- Genus: Vertigo
- Species: V. dedecora

Binomial name
- Vertigo dedecora {Pilsbry, 1902}

Synonyms
- Nesopupa dedecora Pilsbry, 1902 · unaccepted (original combination); Nesopupa tamagonari Pilsbry, Hirase, 1904; Ptychalaea dedecora (Pilsbry, 1902); Vertigo (Vertilla) dedecora (Pilsbry, 1902) · alternate representation

Species of gastropod

Vertigo dedecora is a species of very small air-breathing land snail, a terrestrial pulmonate gastropod mollusk or micromollusk in the family Vertiginidae.

This species is vulnerable.

Was erroneously placed in genus Ptychalaea.

== Description ==
The length of the shell attains 1.6 mm, its diameter 1 mm.

(Original description) The shell is exceedingly small, obesely oval, dark red-brown and faintly striate. It contains 4¾ convex whorls. The body whorl swells in a very conspicuous crest some distance behind the aperture, and is grooved at the position of the upper palatal fold. The aperture is squarish and well rounded below. The brown outer lip is expanded. The parietal lamella is long and strong;. The angular lamella is well developed and not united with the parietal. The small columellar lamella is deeply placed. The basal is fold small, close to the columella. The lower palatal fold is very small and deeply situated. The upper palatal is large and prominent All the teeth are whitish.

== Distribution ==
This species is endemic to Japan.
