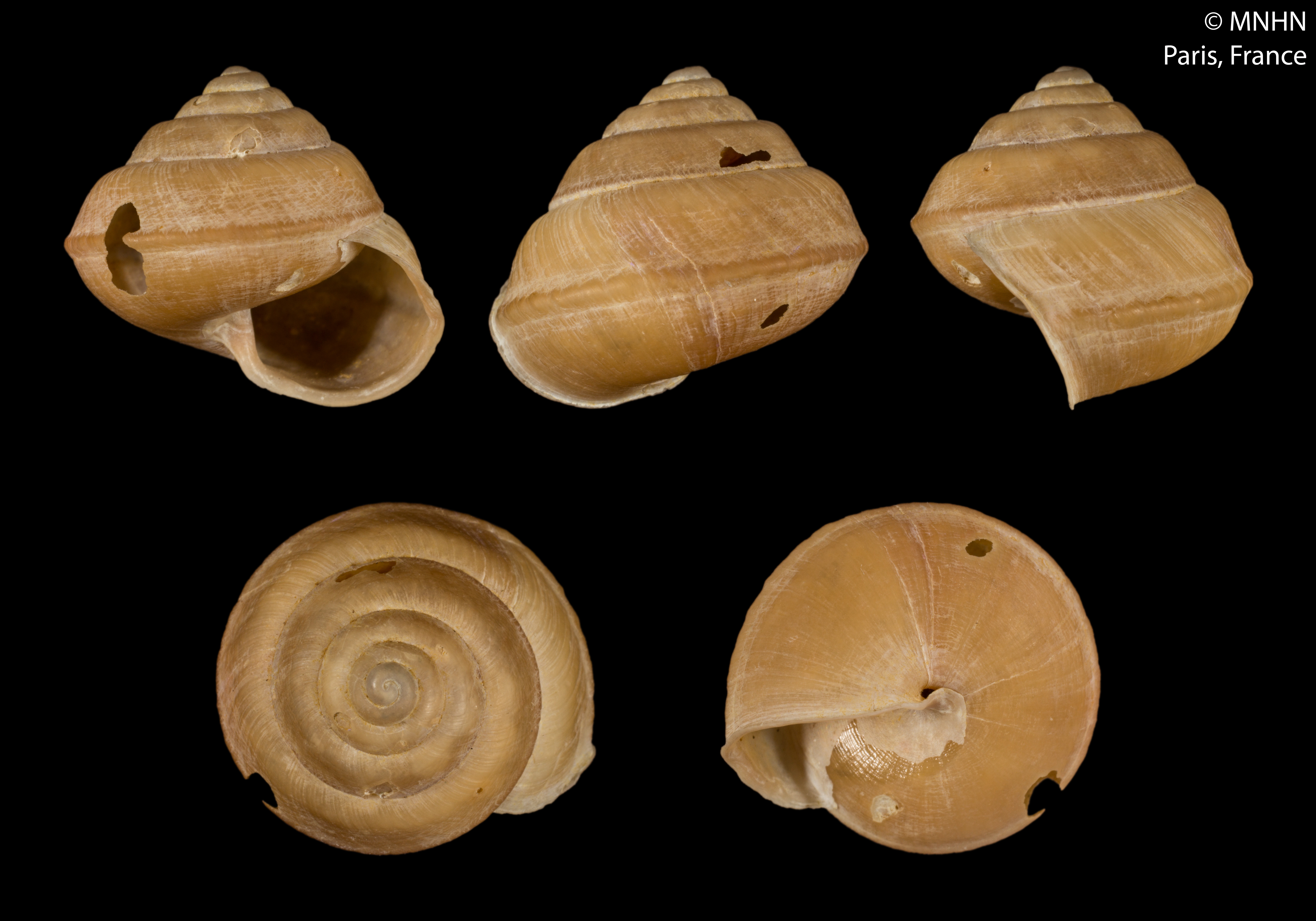
- Shell of Diastole simonei (holotype at MNHN, Paris)

Scientific classification
- Kingdom: Animalia
- Phylum: Mollusca
- Class: Gastropoda
- Order: Stylommatophora
- Family: Microcystidae
- Genus: Diastole; Gude, 1913

Species
- See text

Synonyms
- Diastole (Diastole) Gude, 1913· accepted, alternate representation; Diastole (Euanana) H. B. Baker, 1938· accepted, alternate representation; Diastole (Laua) H. B. Baker, 1938· accepted, alternate representation; Diastole (Trochonanita) H. B. Baker, 1938· accepted, alternate representation; Fanulum Iredale, 1913; Liardetia (Fanulum) Iredale, 1913

= Diastole (gastropod) =

Genus of gastropods

Diastole is a genus of air-breathing land snails or semi-slugs, terrestrial pulmonate gastropod mollusks in the family Microcystidae.

== Species ==
Species in the genus Diastole include:

- Diastole bryani H. B. Baker, 1938
- Diastole conula (Pease, 1861)
- Diastole exposita (Mousson, 1873)
- Diastole fornicata (Ancey, 1889)
- Diastole futunae H. B. Baker, 1938
- Diastole glaucina Baker, 1938
- Diastole lamellaxis Baker, 1938
- Diastole lauae H. B. Baker, 1938
- Diastole matafaoi Baker, 1938, Mount Matafao different snail
- Diastole necrodes H. B. Baker, 1938
- Diastole rurutui H. B. Baker, 1938
- Diastole savaii Baker, 1938
- Diastole schmeltziana (Mousson, 1865)
- Diastole simonei Thach & F. Huber, 2017 (taxon inquirendum)
- Diastole subcarinata Solem, 1959
- Diastole tenuistriata Preece, 1995
- Diastole tongana (Quoy & Gaimard, 1832)
