= Afripupa rodriguezensis =

Conservation status
- Data Deficient (IUCN 2.3)

Scientific classification
- Kingdom: Animalia
- Phylum: Mollusca
- Class: Gastropoda
- Order: Stylommatophora
- Family: Vertiginidae
- Genus: Afripupa
- Species: A. rodriguezensis

Binomial name
- Afripupa rodriguezensis (Connolly, 1925)

Synonyms
- Nesopupa (Afripupa) rodriguezensis Connolly, 1925 (superseded combination); Nesopupa rodriguezensis Connolly, 1925 (original combination)

Species of snail

Afripupa rodriguezensis is a species of very small, air-breathing land snail, a terrestrial pulmonate gastropod mollusc in the family Vertiginidae, the whorl snails.

This species is endemic to Mauritius.
