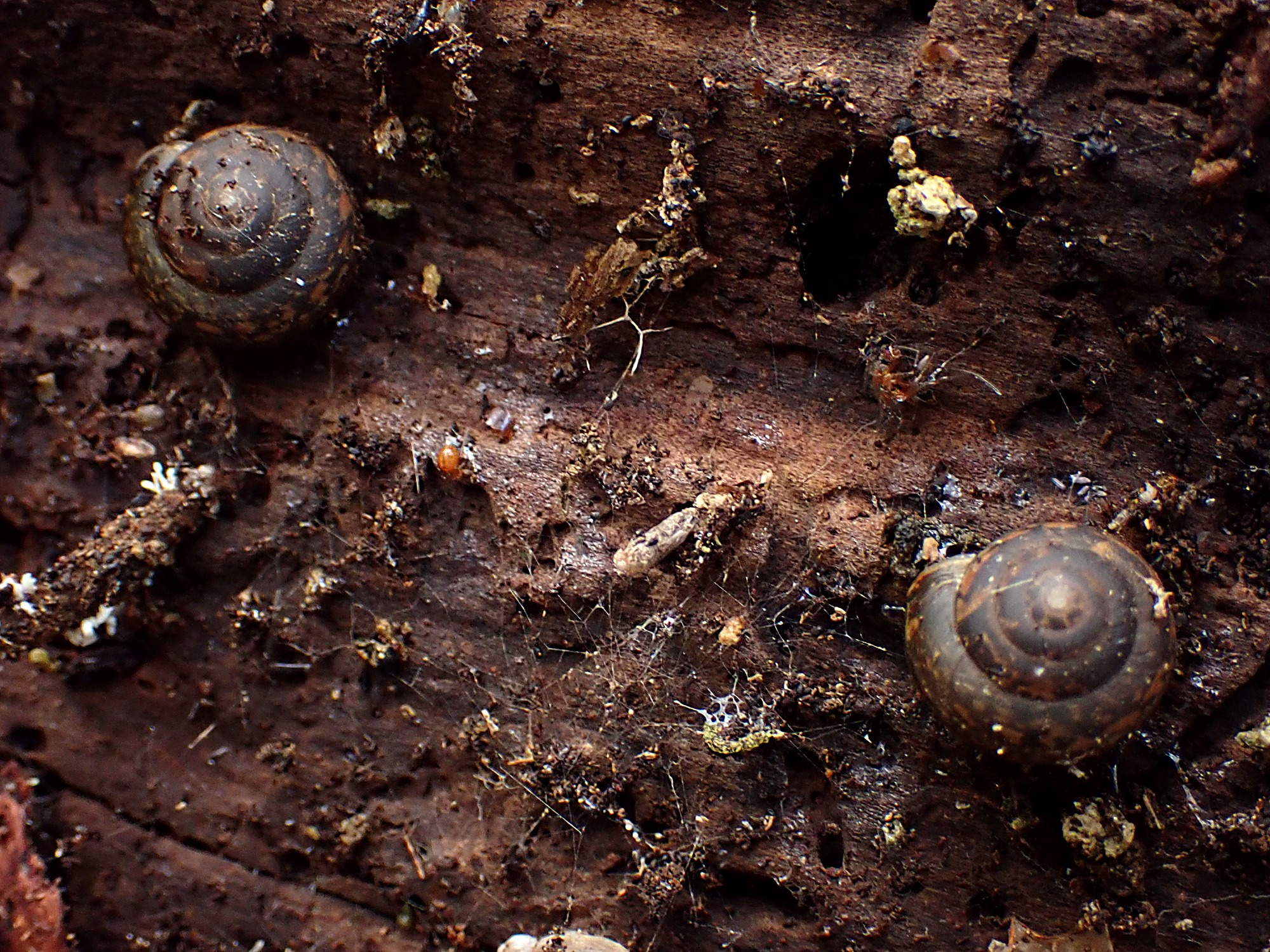

Scientific classification
- Kingdom: Animalia
- Phylum: Mollusca
- Class: Gastropoda
- Order: Stylommatophora
- Family: Helicarionidae
- Genus: Advena; Gude, 1913

Species and subspecies
- Advena campbellii (J. E. Gray, 1834); Advena campbellii campbellii (J. E. Gray, 1834); Advena campbellii nepeanensis Preston, 1913; Advena grayi (Sykes, 1900); Advena phillipii (J. E. Gray, 1834); Advena stoddartii (J. E. Gray, 1834); Advena stoddartii flosculus (J. C. Cox, 1866); Advena stoddartii intermedia (Preston, 1913); Advena stoddartii stoddartii (J. E. Gray, 1834); Advena suteri (Sykes, 1900)

Synonyms
- Belloconcha Preston, 1913 junior subjective synonym; Mathewsoconcha Preston, 1913 junior subjective synonym; Quintalia Preston, 1913 junior subjective synonym

= Advena (gastropod) =

Genus of gastropods

Advena, formerly Quintalia, is a genus of air-breathing land snails or semislugs, terrestrial pulmonate gastropod mollusks in the family Helicarionidae.
