= Advena stoddartii =

Conservation status
- Extinct (IUCN 2.3)

Scientific classification
- Kingdom: Animalia
- Phylum: Mollusca
- Class: Gastropoda
- Order: Stylommatophora
- Family: Helicarionidae
- Genus: Advena
- Species: †A. stoddartii

Binomial name
- †Advena stoddartii (J. E. Gray, 1834)

Synonyms
- Carocolla stoddartii J. E. Gray, 1834 (original combination); Quintalia stoddarti sic incorrect subsequent spelling; Quintalia stoddartii (J. E. Gray, 1834)

Extinct species of gastropod

Advena stoddartii is an extinct species of air-breathing land snail or semislug, a terrestrial pulmonate gastropod mollusk in the family Helicarionidae. This species was endemic to Norfolk Island.
