= Notocorrhenes =

Scientific classification
- Kingdom: Animalia
- Phylum: Arthropoda
- Class: Insecta
- Order: Coleoptera
- Suborder: Polyphaga
- Infraorder: Cucujiformia
- Family: Cerambycidae
- Tribe: Pteropliini
- Genus: Notocorrhenes
- Species: N. dispersa

Binomial name
- Notocorrhenes dispersa (Pascoe, 1859)

Genus of beetles

Notocorrhenes is a genus of beetle belonging to the family Cerambycidae. Its only species is Notocorrhenes dispersa. It was described by Pascoe in 1859.
