= Henrik Henriksen Beck =

Danish geologist, conchologist and naturalist

- Born: 1799
- Died: 1863 (aged 63–64)
- Scientific career
- Fields: conchologist, geologist and naturalist.

Henrik Henriksen Beck (1799–1863) was a Danish geologist, conchologist, and naturalist. He wrote Index molluscorum praesentis aevi musei principis augustissimi Christiani Frederici (1837) in which several new species were described and Bemærkninger om Danmarks Geologi : oplæste i det geologiske Selskab (1835).
