= Horace Burrington Baker =

American malacologist (1889–1971)

- Born: 1889; Sioux City, Iowa, U.S.
- Died: 1971 (aged 81–82)
- Education: University of Michigan
- Known for: Contributions to malacology; Editor and Business Manager of The Nautilus
- Spouse: Bernadine C. Baker
- Scientific career
- Fields: Malacology, Zoology
- Workplaces: University of Pennsylvania, The Nautilus

Horace Burrington Baker (1889–1971) was an American malacologist.

He was born in Sioux City, Iowa, and after serving as a lieutenant in the U.S. Army in 1917–18, was awarded a PhD in 1920 by the University of Michigan.

He became a zoologist specializing in malacology. He was an instructor at the University of Pennsylvania in 1920, an assistant professor in 1926, an associate professor in 1928 and professor from 1939 to 1959. He was also business manager (1932–56) and editor (1957–70) of the Nautilus, the journal of malacology.

His spouse was Bernadine C. Baker (1906).

A species of snake, Leptodeira bakeri, is named in his honor.

== Bibliography ==
(1938–1941) Zonitid snails from Pacific islands.
