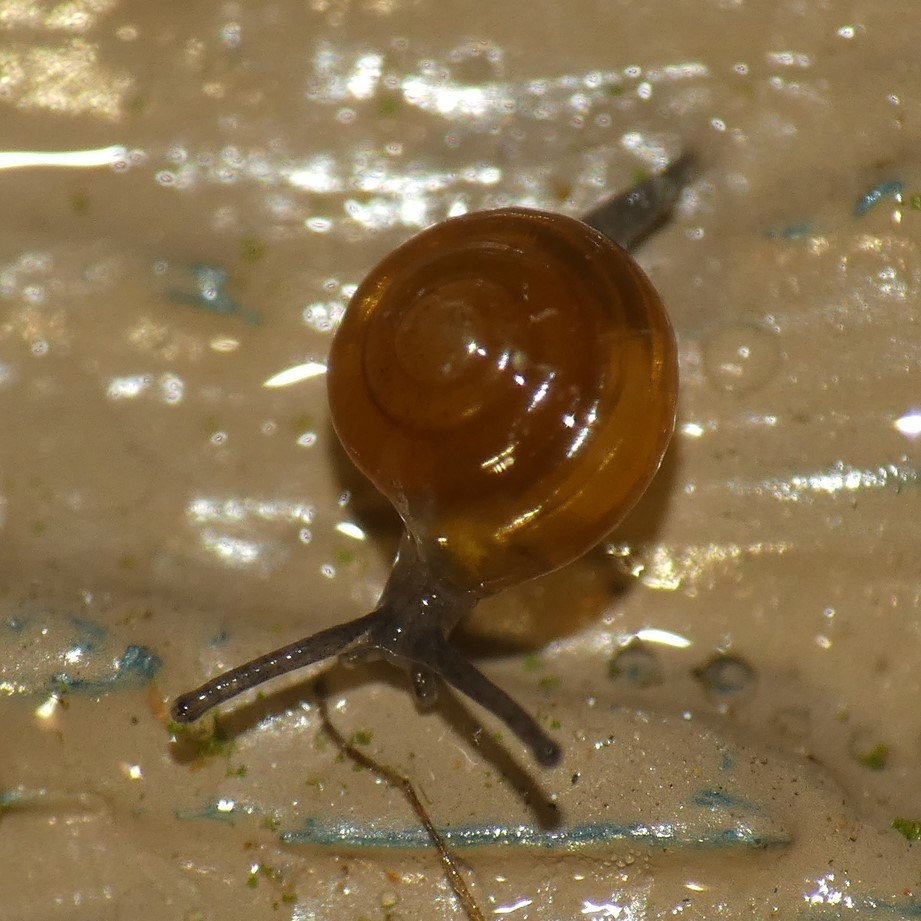
- Wilhelminaia mathildae

Scientific classification
- Kingdom: Animalia
- Phylum: Mollusca
- Class: Gastropoda
- Order: Stylommatophora
- Superfamily: Trochomorphoidea
- Family: Microcystidae; Thiele, 1931

= Microcystidae =

Family of gastropods

Microcystidae is a family of land snails in the order Stylommatophora.

== Species ==
As of 2026, there were 23 genera recognized in the family Microcystidae:

Subfamily Liardetiinae H. B. Baker, 1938

- Cookeana H. B. Baker, 1938
- Deliciola Iredale, 1944
- KieconchaIredale, 1913
- Kusaiea H. B. Baker, 1938
- Liardetia Gude, 1913
- Pukaloa H. B. Baker, 1938
- SiamoconusPholyotha, 2023
- Wilhelminaia Preston, 1913

Subfamily Microcystinae Thiele, 1931

- Allenoconcha Preston, 1913
- Diastole Gude, 1913
- Fanulena Iredale, 1945
- Innesoconcha Iredale, 1944
- Lamprocystis Pfeffer,1883
- Microcystis H. Beck, 1838
- Tengchiena H. B. Baker, 1942

Subfamily Philonesiinae H. B. Baker, 1938

- Aukena H. B. Baker, 1940
- Hiona H. B. Baker, 1940
- Kaala C. M. Cooke, 1940
- Mendana H. B. Baker, 1938
- Philonesia Sykes, 1900

Subfamily Incerta sedis

- Genus Pittoconcha Preston, 1913
- Genus Advena Gude, 1913
- Genus Greenwoodoconcha Preston, 1913
