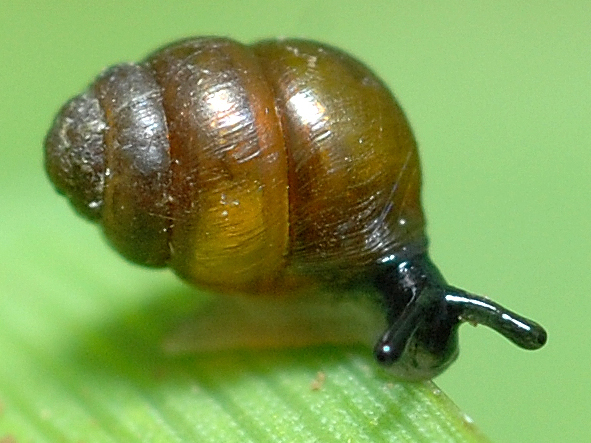
- A live individual of Vertigo moulinsiana

Scientific classification
- Kingdom: Animalia
- Phylum: Mollusca
- Class: Gastropoda
- Order: Stylommatophora
- Superfamily: Pupilloidea
- Family: Vertiginidae; Fitzinger, 1833

Diversity
- 93–95 species

= Vertiginidae =

Vertiginidae Temporal range: Upper Paleocene-recent

Family of gastropods

Vertiginidae, common name the whorl snails, is a family of small, air-breathing land snails, terrestrial pulmonate gastropod molluscs or micromollusks in the superfamily Pupilloidea.

== Distribution ==
The distribution of the Vertiginidae is in the Northern Hemisphere: North America (60 species), Eurasia (30 species), North and central Africa (3-5 species). That gives a total of approximately 93-95 species.

== Ecology ==
Snails in this family inhabit habitats ranging from forests to semi-open and open habitats with various different kinds of substrate cover, vegetation and humidity. They feed on microflora - bacteria and fungi - growing on dead and living plants.

== Taxonomy ==
The following three subfamilies were recognized in the taxonomy of Bouchet & Rocroi (2005):

- Subfamily Vertigininae Fitzinger, 1833
  - Tribe Vertiginini Fitzinger, 1833
  - Tribe Truncatellinini Steenberg, 1925 - synonyms: Truncatellininae; Columellinae Schileyko, 1998 - raised in 2016 to family level Truncatellinidae
- Subfamily Gastrocoptinae Pilsbry, 1918 - synonyms: Hypselostomatinae Zilch, 1959; Aulacospirinae Zilch, 1959
- Subfamily Nesopupinae Steenberg, 1925 - synonym: Cylindrovertillidae Iredale, 1940

== Genera ==
Genera in the family Vertiginidae include:

Subfamily Vertigininae

Tribe Vertiginini

- Vertigo O. F. Müller, 1773 - the type genus of the family Vertiginidae

Subfamily Nesopupinae

- Bothriopupa Pilsbry, 1898
  - Bothriopupa tenuidens (C. B. Adams, 1845)
- Costigo O. Boettger, 1891
- Cylindrovertilla O. Boettger, 1881
- Glandicula F. Sandberger, 1875 †
- Helenopupa Pilsbry & C. M. Cooke, 1920
- Indopupa Pilsbry & C. M. Cooke, 1920
- Insulipupa Pilsbry & C. M. Cooke, 1920
- Lyropupa Pilsbry, 1900
- Minacilla H. Nordsieck, 2014 †
- Negulopsis H. Nordsieck, 2014 †
- Nesopupa Pilsbry, 1900 - the type genus of the subfamily Nesopupinae
- Nesopuparia Pilsbry, 1926
- Nesopupilla Pilsbry & C. M. Cooke, 1920
- Nesoropupa Gargominy, 2008
- Paracraticula Oppenheim, 1890 †
- Pronesopupa Iredale, 1913
- Trigonopupa H. Nordsieck, 2014 †
- Staurodon Lowe, 1852: synonym of Vertigo O. F. Müller, 1773

Subfamily ?

- Acmopupa O. Boettger, 1889 †
- Propupa Stworzewicz & Pokryszko, 2006 †
- Pseudelix O. Boettger, 1889 †
- Tetoripupa Isaji, 2010 †
- Sterkia Pilsbry, 1898: synonym of Vertigo O. F. Müller, 1773
