= Hahajima =

Second largest of the Ogasawara islands

Native name: 母島
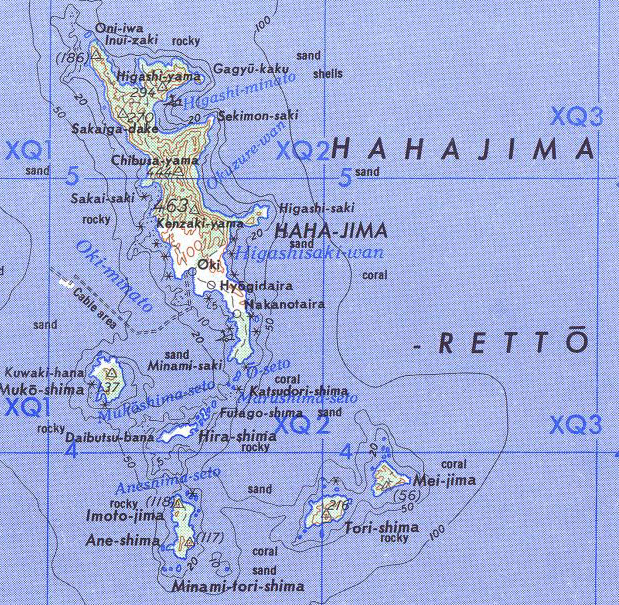
- Map of the Hahajima Rettō (Imōtojima is mislabeled as Tori-shima)

- Location within Japan

Geography
- Location: Pacific Ocean
- Coordinates: 26°39′N 142°10′E
- Archipelago: Bonin Islands
- Area: 19.88 km^{2} (7.68 sq mi)
- Highest elevation: 462 m (1516 ft)
- Highest point: Chibusayama

Administration
- Japan
- Prefecture: Tokyo
- Subprefecture: Ogasawara
- Village: Ogasawara

Demographics
- Population: 440 (2021)
- Pop. density: 22.1/km^{2} (57.2/sq mi)
- Ethnic groups: Japanese

Hahajima, Haha Jima, or Haha-jima (母島; meaning Mother Island) is the second-largest island within the Bonin or Ogasawara Islands south southeast of the Japanese Home Islands. The steeply-sloped island, which is about 21 km^{2} (8 sq mi) in area, has a population of 440. It is part of Ogasawara Village in Ogasawara Subprefecture, which is approximately 1,000 km (620 mi) south of Tokyo, Japan.

The highest peaks Hahajima are Chibusayama (lit. Breast Mountain), approximately 462 metres (1,516 ft), and Sakaigatake, 443 metres (1,453 ft). It is part of an archipelago that includes Chichijima approximately 50 km (31 mi) to the north and the nearby smaller islands such as Anejima and Imōtojima and Mukōjima. The group forms the Hahajima Rettō (母島列島; formerly the "Baily Group").

== History ==
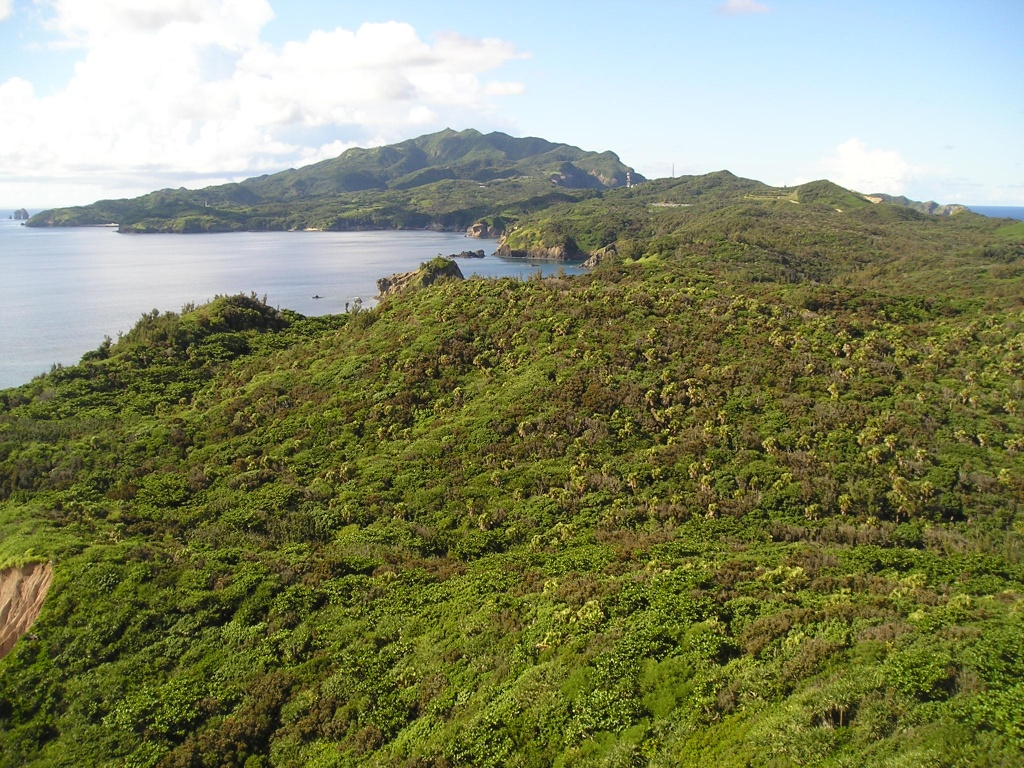
View of the southern tip of Hahajima, the Minamizaki peninsula

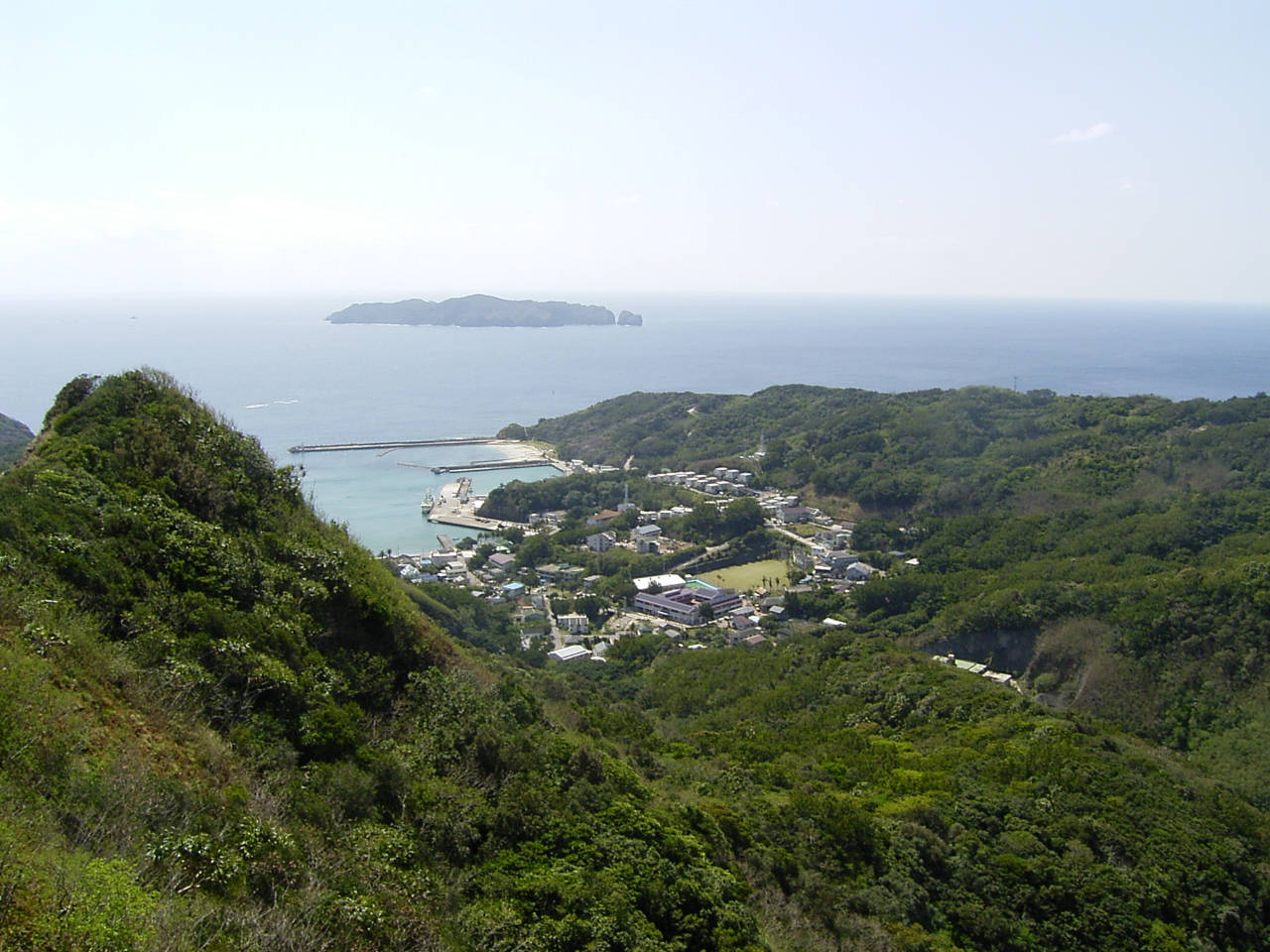
Oki village, Mukōjima in the distance

Micronesian tools and carvings suggest prehistoric visits or settlement but the island was long uninhabited before its rediscovery, sometimes—but probably mistakenly—credited to Bernardo de la Torre during his failed 1543 attempt to find a northern route back to Mexico from the Philippines. Captain James Coffin, of the whaler Transit originally named the largest island in the group "Fisher Island", which became Hahajima, and the second largest "Kidd Island", after the owners of his vessel. The islands came to be known as the "Coffin Islands". (Hahajima was also called Hillsborough Island.) Hahajima was settled by Europeans before becoming part of Japan.

During the Pacific War, the Japanese government removed the local civilian population and fortified the island. It was attacked several times by the US bombers. First on December 4, 1944 when Navy search planes of Fleet Air Wing One joined with Seventh Air Force bombers to attack installations on the island as well as Iwo Jima. Four days later there was another attack by Fleet Air Wing One. Then on December 10, B-25 Mitchells from the 2nd Marine Aircraft Wing struck at shipping moored at Hahajima. The remains of defensive fortifications are now one of the island's tourist attractions.

The population, which was 1,546 in 1904 and 1,905 in 1940, is now only 450. A single road connects the abandoned village of Kitamura (北村) at the north end of the island to the village of Okimura (沖村) – formerly "Newport", at the southern end of the island, where the harbor is located. The island can be reached by ferry in about two hours from Chichijima. The economy of Hahajima is based on commercial fishing, tourism, and a state-run rum distillery. Cocoa (Theobroma cacao) is also grown on Hahajima, but it is a relatively small operation by the Sōka-based Hiratsuka Confectionery Company.

== Education ==
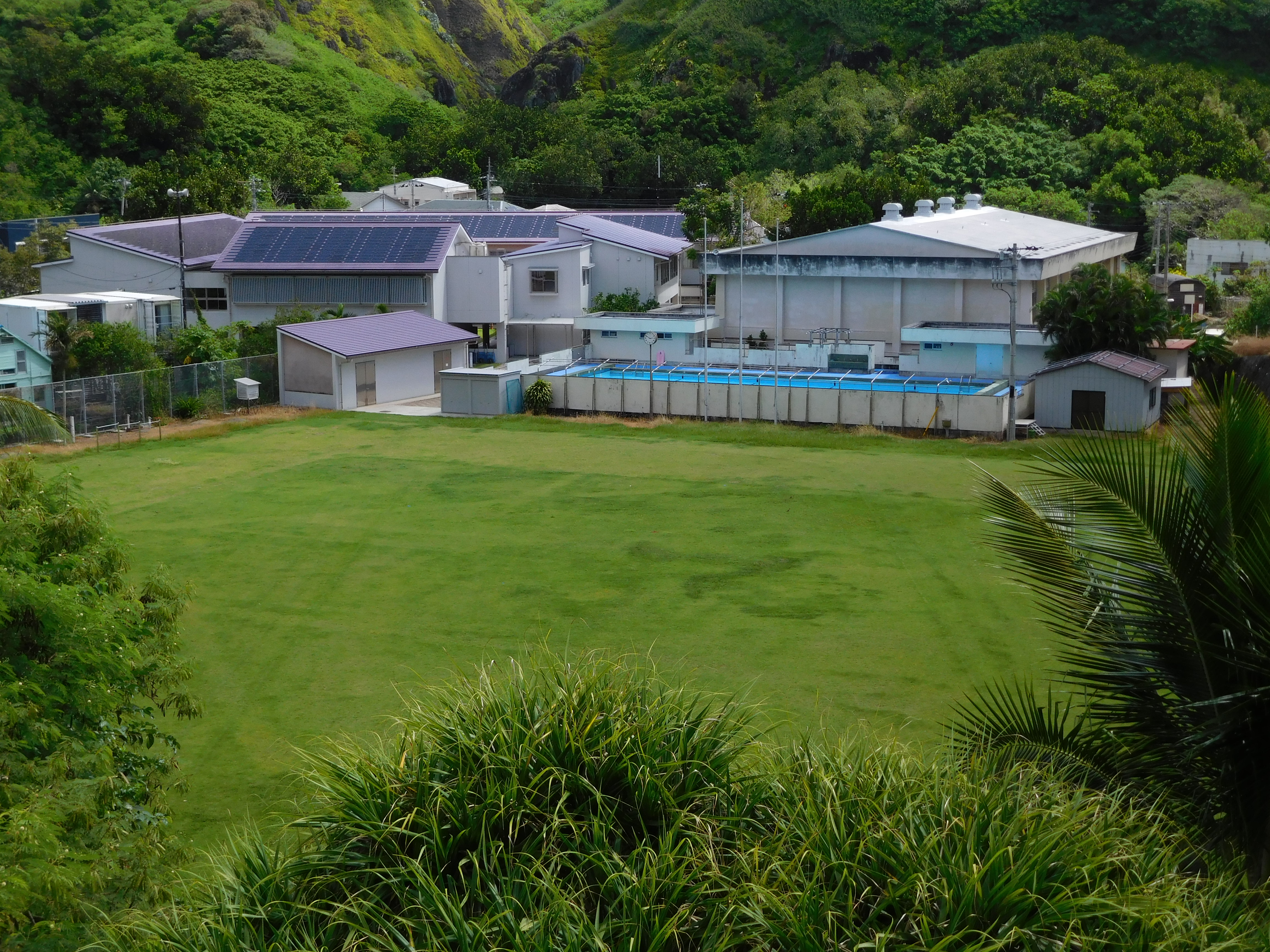
Haha-jima Elementary School and Junior High School (小笠原村立母島小中学校)

Ogasawara Village operates the island's public elementary and junior high school, Ogasawara Village Municipal Haha-jima Elementary School and Junior High School (小笠原村立母島小中学校). The Tokyo Metropolitan Government Board of Education operates Ogasawara High School on nearby Chichijima.

== Ecology ==
Hahajima is of considerable interest to malacologists because of its endemic land snail fauna, including the eponymous Lamprocystis hahajimana. Due to the widespread presence of invasive species including goats (which destroy habitat) and rodents, flatworms and the rosy wolfsnail (which eat the native snails), it was feared that many of the endemics had become extinct.

But most if not all of the endemic land snail species seem to persist on the remote Higashizaki peninsula on the eastern coast. This is a quite pristine expanse of ground, scenic but very hard to reach (one has to climb Mt. Chibusa before descending to the peninsula). It consists of sheer seacliffs surrounding a plateau with Chinese fan palm (Livistona chinensis), pandanus and broadleaf (e.g. Persea kobu, a wild avocado) forest, and appears to be untouched by invasive species at present. It has been proposed that access to the area should be monitored, so that visitors will not inadvertently contribute to destroying this unique area.

=== Snails ===
All of these snails are endemic at least to the Bonin Islands.

- Boninena callistoderma – Endangered, now restricted to Hahajima and nearby Anejima
- Gastrocopta boninensis – Vulnerable
- Hirasea acutissima – Endangered (believed extinct, rediscovered 2003), endemic to Hahajima
- Lamellidea biplicata – Vulnerable
- Lamprocystis hahajimana – Endangered
- Mandarina hahajimana – Data deficient, possibly a new taxon
- Mandarina polita – Data deficient
- Ogasawarana yoshiwarana – Critically endangered (believed extinct, rediscovered 2003), endemic to Hahajima
- Ogasawarana arata – Data deficient
- Paludinella minima – Data deficient
- Vertigo dedecora – Vulnerable
- Tornatellides tryoni

=== Birds ===
Among birds, the Bonin white-eye (Apalopteron familiare), a gaudy-colored passerine, now only occurs on Hahajima. The extinct Bonin grosbeak (Chaunoproctus ferreorostris) is sometimes said to have occurred in the Hahajima Group (though not on Haha-jima itself), but this seems not to be true. Columba janthina nitens, the Bonin subspecies of the Japanese wood-pigeon, used to occur on Haha-jima. While it is not precisely known when it vanished from this island, the taxon apparently became completely extinct during the 1980s, but was rediscovered in 1998. The island has been recognised as an Important Bird Area (IBA) by BirdLife International.
