= Minamitorishima =

Japanese coral atoll

Native name: 南鳥島
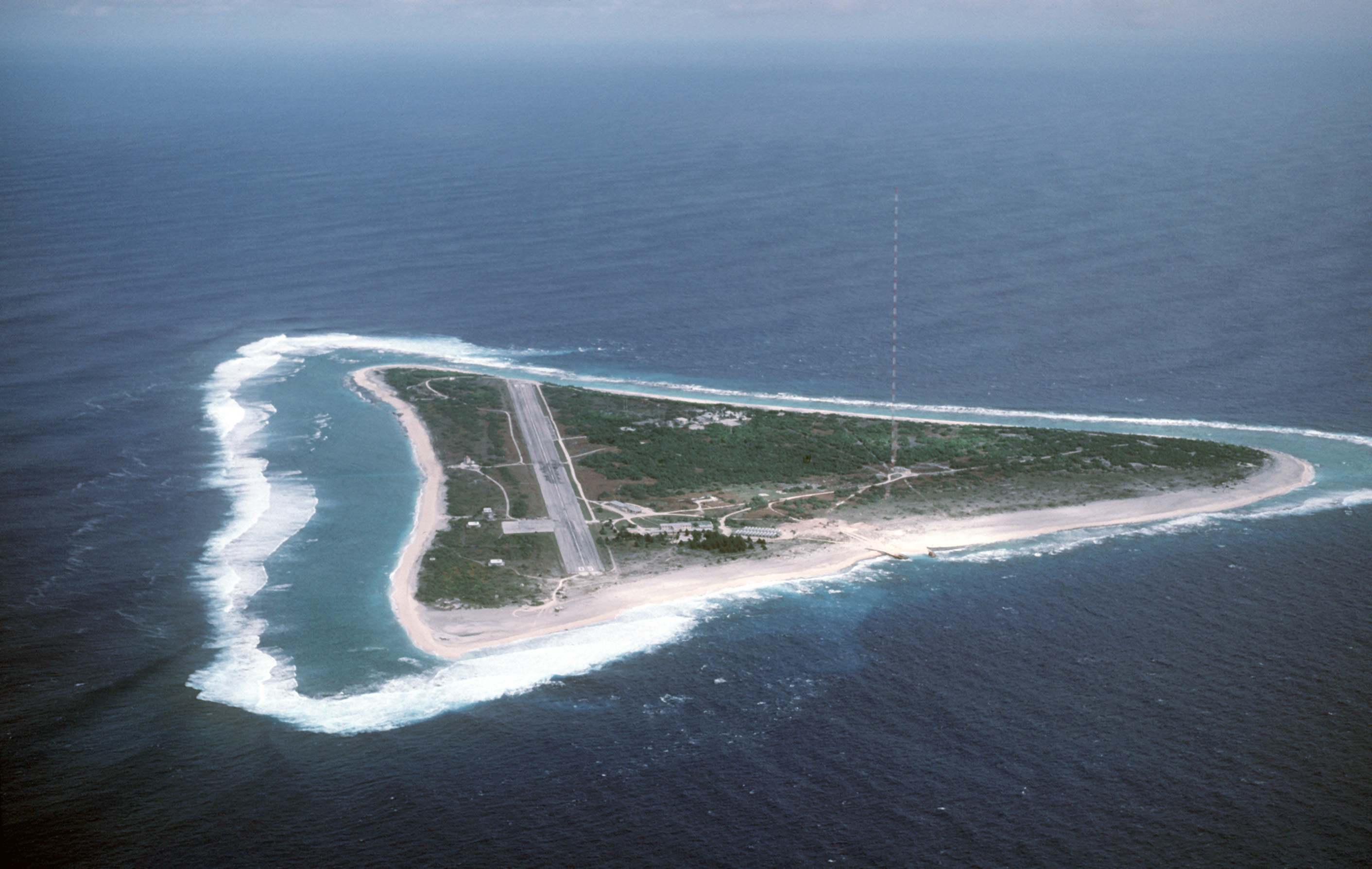
- An aerial photo of Minamitorishima in 1987

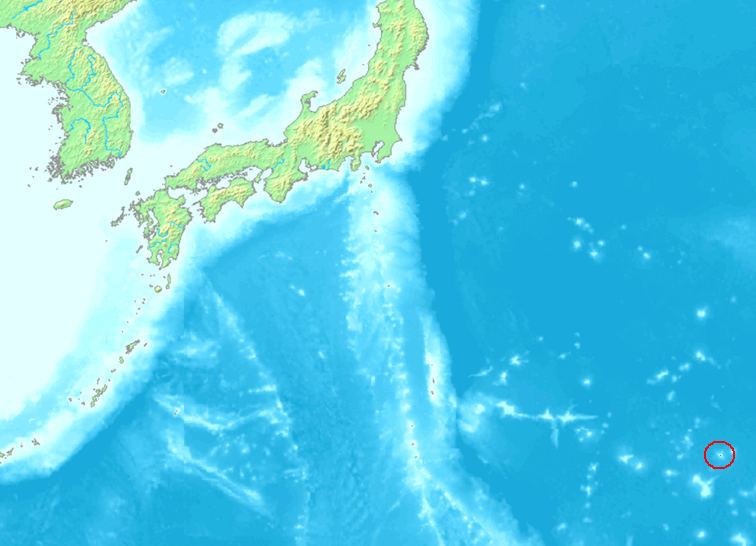

Geography
- Location: Pacific Ocean
- Coordinates: 24°17′12″N 153°58′50″E
- Total islands: 1
- Area: 1.51 km^{2} (0.58 sq mi)
- Coastline: 6,000 m (20000 ft)
- Highest elevation: 9 m (30 ft)

Administration
- Japan
- Prefecture: Tokyo
- Subprefecture: Ogasawara
- Village: Ogasawara

Demographics
- Population: no permanent residents. Periodic visits by JMA and JSDF personnel. Visiting permits occasionally granted for specific purposes only.

Additional information
- Time zone: JST (UTC+9)

Minamitorishima (南鳥島; lit. "Southern Bird Island"), sometimes known as Minami-Tori-shima or Minami-Torishima and also known as Marcus Island, is an isolated Japanese coral atoll in the northwestern Pacific Ocean. It is the easternmost and most isolated territory belonging to Japan, and the only Japanese territory on the Pacific Plate, past the Japan Trench. Although small (151 ha or 370 acres), it is of strategic importance, as it enables Japan to claim a 428,875 km^{2} (125,040 sq nmi) exclusive economic zone in the surrounding waters.

It is the easternmost territory of Tokyo, being administratively part of Ogasawara Subprefecture. No civilians live there, except personnel of the Japan Meteorological Agency, Japan Self-Defense Forces (JSDF), and Japan Coast Guard serving temporary tours of duty on the island.

== Access ==
The island is off limits to civilians except for Japan Meteorological Agency staff. Reporters, documentary makers, and scientific researchers can sometimes get an entry permit. No commercial boat tours or flights visit the island, and civilians are currently not allowed access to Minamitorishima for tours or sightseeing, due to its use by the JSDF as an observation station.

== Geography and geology ==
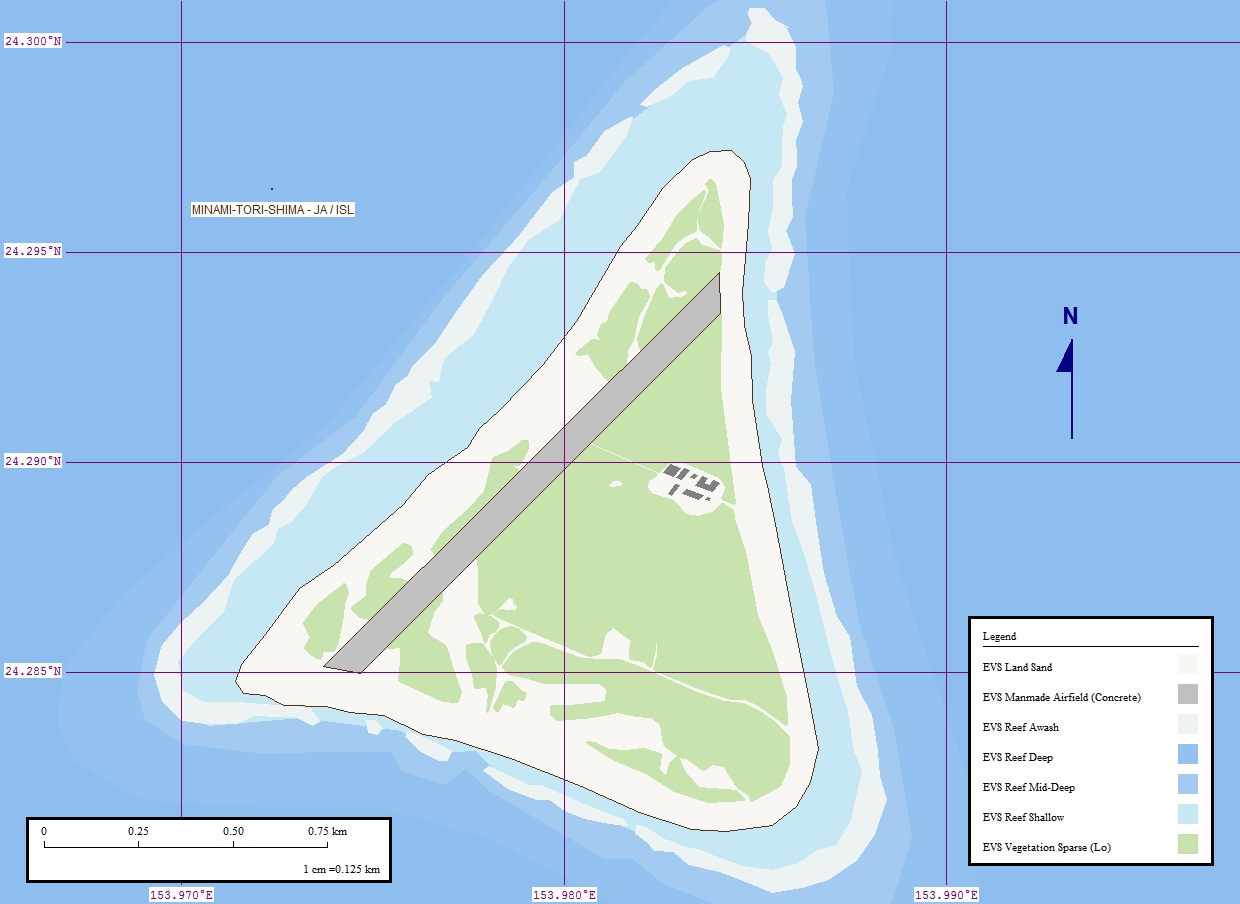
A map of Minamitorishima

Minamitorishima is very remote. There is no other land for over 1,000 km (540 nmi; 621 mi) in any direction.

Minamitorishima is located some 1,848 km (998 nmi; 1,148 mi) southeast of Tokyo and 1,267 km (684 nmi; 787 mi) east of the closest Japanese island, South Iwo Jima of the Volcano Islands, and nearly on a straight line between mainland Tokyo and Wake Island, 1,415 km (764 nmi; 879 mi) further to the east-southeast. The closest island to Minamitorishima is East Island in the Mariana Islands, which is 1,015 km (548 nmi; 631 mi) to the west-southwest.

The island is triangular in shape, and has a saucer-like profile, with a raised outer rim of between 5 and 9 m (16 and 30 ft) above sea level. The central area of the island is 1 m (3 ft) below sea level. Minamitorishima is surrounded by fringing reefs, which range from 50 to 300 m (164 to 984 ft) in width, enclosing a shallow lagoon, which is connected with the open ocean by narrow passages on the southern and northeastern sides.

Outside the reef, the ocean depths quickly plunge to over 1,000 m (3,300 ft). The island has a total land area of 1.51 km^{2} (1 mi^{2}). It takes about 45 minutes to walk around the island.

The sea is clear in the shallow area around Minamitorishima. At night, no light pollution occurs, so rarely noticed stars are clearly visible in the sky.

The island does not have soil adequate to produce substantial crops, so food is brought in by supply ships and planes. The only foods grown on the island are papaya, mustard greens, and coconuts. Saltwater fish are caught offshore.

=== Minamitorishima area rare-earth deposits ===
After China restricted exports of strategic rare-earth oxides (REOs) in 2009, Japan started to explore its seabeds for deposits.

In January 2013, a deep-sea research vessel of the Japan Agency for Marine-Earth Science and Technology obtained seven deep-sea mud core samples from the seafloor at 5,600 to 5,800 m (18,400 to 19,000 ft) depth, about 250 km (130 nmi; 160 mi) south of the island. The research team found a mud layer 2 to 4 m (6.6 to 13.1 ft) beneath the seabed that is extremely concentrated in REO. Analytical results showed that the maximum REO content in the mud was up to 0.66%.

In 2018, a scientific study of the seabed mud estimated that 16 million tons of REO mineralised sediments were within the studied area. The calculated rare-earth element and yttrium content for the research area was more than 16 million tons (average = 964 ppm).

In February 2026, the Japanese government announced the retrieval of sediment containing rare earth minerals at a depth of 6,000 m (20,000 ft) below sea level off the island's coast.

== Natural resources ==
In January 2026, the deep-sea scientific drilling vessel Chikyū, operated by the Japan Agency for Marine-Earth Science and Technology (JAMSTEC), conducted the world's first trial extraction of rare earth-rich mud from approximately 6,000 m (20,000 ft) below the sea surface near the island, as part of Japan's Strategic Innovation Promotion Program.

The mission lasted until 14 February 2026 and targeted the retrieval of approximately 35 t (34 long tons) of seabed mud, each tonne estimated to contain around 2 kg (4.4 lb) of rare earth elements. Japan's Deputy Chief Cabinet Secretary Masanao Ozaki described the successful retrieval as "a meaningful achievement from the perspectives of economic security and comprehensive ocean development."

The Japan Times reported that full industrialisation of the process is targeted by 2028, requiring demonstrated viability from mining through separation and refining. Environmental groups raised concerns about potential damage to deep-sea ecosystems. The government stated it would collect ecological data throughout the trial.

== Wildlife ==
A species in the gecko family Gekkonidae, Perochirus ateles, inhabits the island. In Japan, these are found only in Minamitorishima and South Iwo Jima. They are thought to have arrived from Micronesia on driftwood.

A large number of land snails, Achatina fulica, have parasites that are harmful to humans. Marine life inhabits the ocean around the island, including sea snakes, tuna, sharks, and some rare fish. Small fish are in the shallow area around the island.

== Population ==
No local residents live on Minamitorishima. Civilians are not allowed to reside there, and the personnel of the Japan Meteorological Agency, JSDF, and the Japan Coast Guard, only serve on the island for a limited time, and in limited numbers.

== History ==
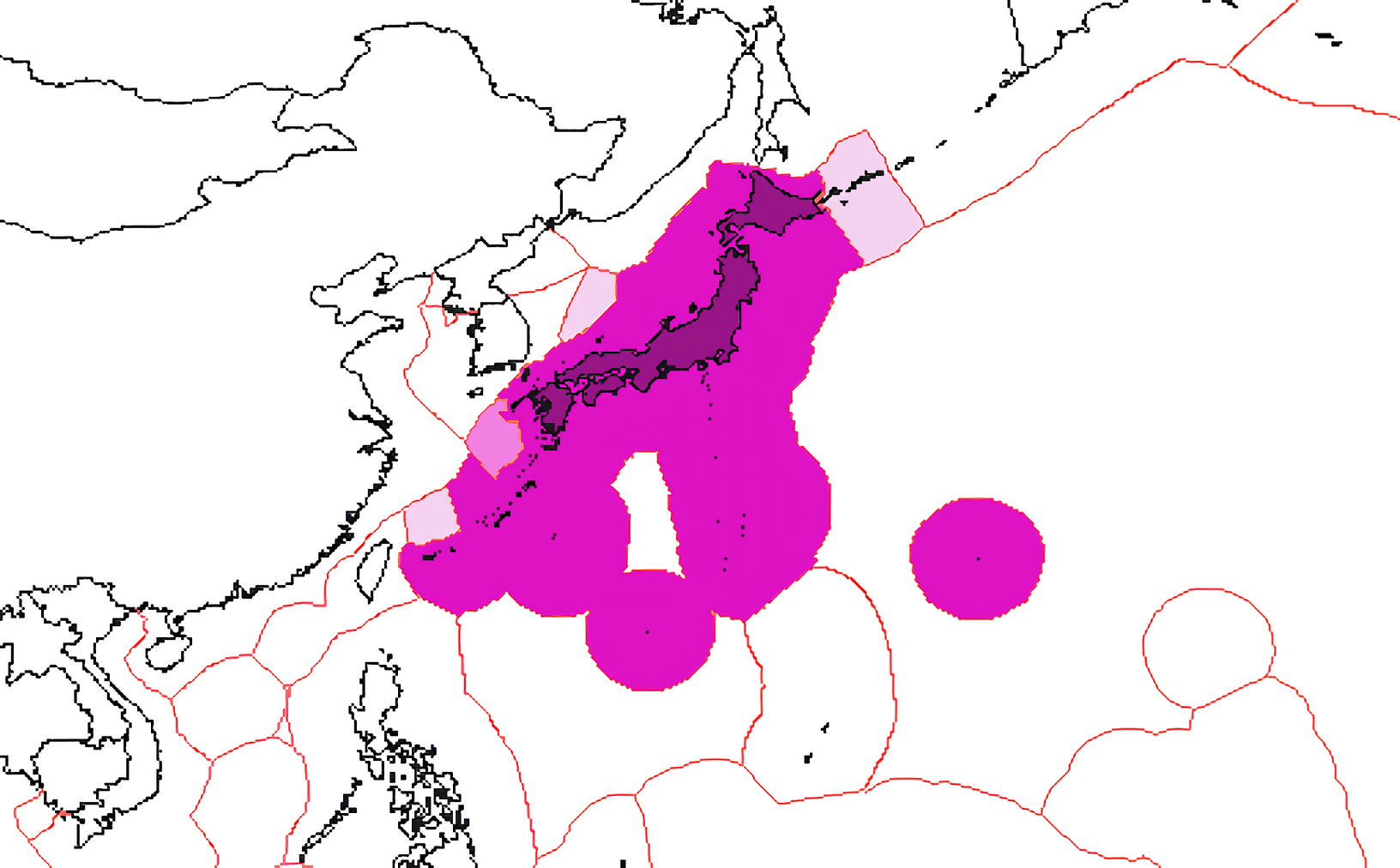
Japan's exclusive economic zones: Minamitorishima is at the center of the isolated easternmost circle. Japan's EEZ Joint regime with Republic of Korea EEZ claimed by Japan, disputed by others

=== First known sightings ===
The first discovery and mention of an island in this area was made by a Spanish Manila galleon captain, Andrés de Arriola, in 1694. It was charted in Spanish maps as Sebastián López, after Spanish Admiral Sebastián López, victorious in the battles of La Naval de Manila in 1646 against the Dutch. Its exact location was left unrecorded until further sightings in the 19th century.

Captain Bourn Russell (1794–1880) in the Lady Rowena departed Sydney, NSW, 2 November 1830 on a Pacific whaling voyage. On his return on 27 June 1832, he reported an island, not on his charts, which he named "William the Fourth's Island". The Sydney Herald reported Russell's description of the size, shape, and orientation of the island and its reef, but misspelled his name and gave the island a Southern Hemisphere latitude.

The island was sighted again on 16 December 1864 by Captain Charles Gelett of the Hawaiian Evangelical Association's missionary ship Morning Star, and was called "Weeks Island" by him. Its position was recorded by a United States survey ship in 1874 and first sighted by a Japanese national, Kiozaemon Saito, in 1879.

=== Colonization and sovereignty contention ===
On 30 June 1886, Japanese explorer Shinroku Mizutani (水谷新六, 1850–1921) led a group of 46 colonists from Haha-jima in the Bonin Islands to settle on Marcus Island. The settlement was named "Mizutani" after the leader of the expedition. The Empire of Japan officially annexed the island 24 July 1898, the previous United States claim from 1889 according to the Guano Islands Act not being officially acknowledged. The island was officially named "Minamitorishima" and placed administratively under the Ogasawara Subprefecture of Tokyo (Tōkyō-fu).

Sovereignty over the island before World War I was apparently disputed, as various sources from the time move the island from the American to Japanese domain without specific explanation. In 1902, the United States dispatched a warship from Hawaii to enforce its claims, but withdrew on finding the island still inhabited by Japanese, with a Japanese warship patrolling nearby.

In 1914, William D. Boyce included Marcus Island as an obviously American island in his book, The Colonies and Dependencies of the United States. In 1933, by orders of the Japanese government, the civilian inhabitants of Minamitorishima were evacuated. In 1935, the Imperial Japanese Navy established a meteorological station on the island and built an airstrip.

=== World War II ===
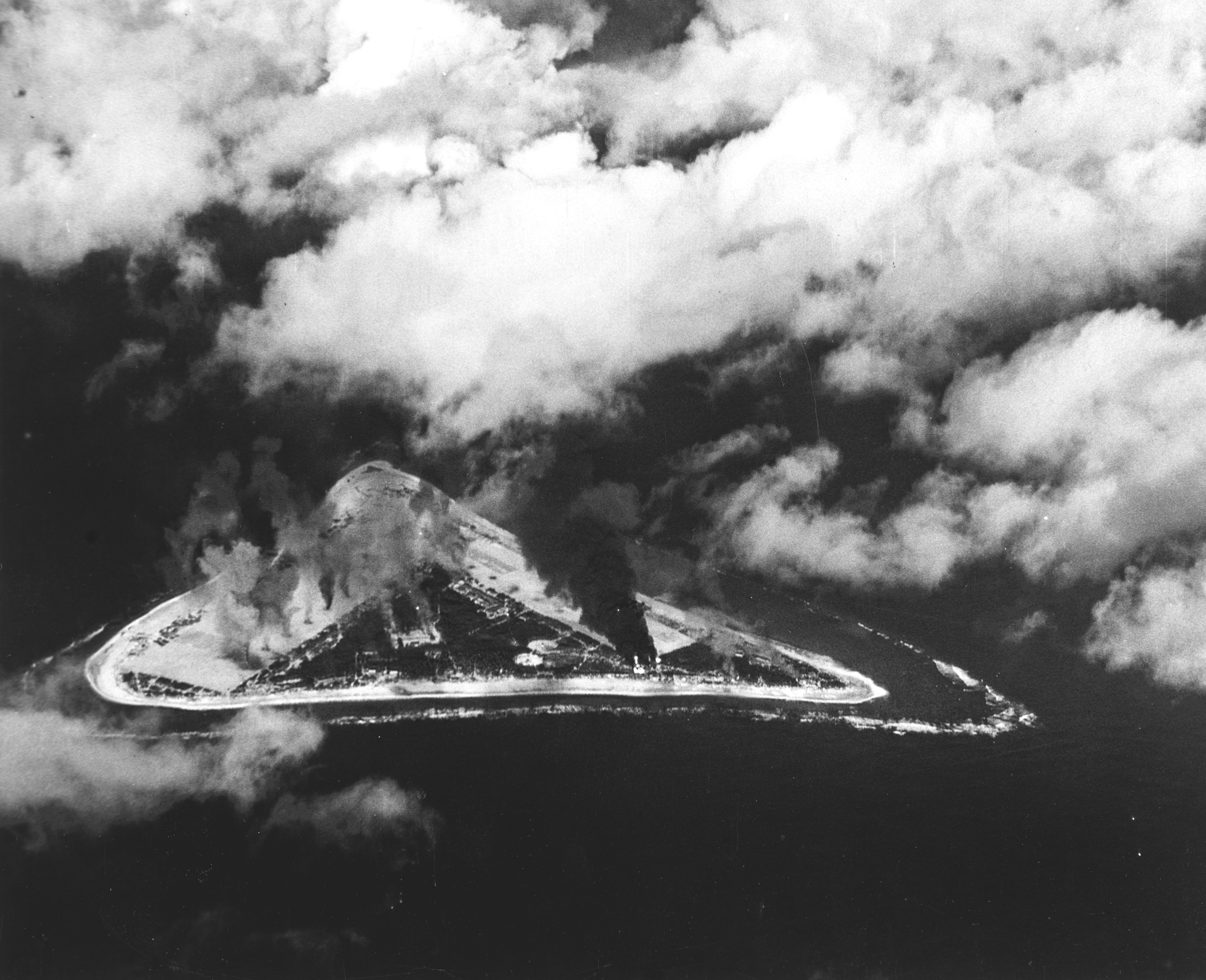
Minamitorishima under attack on 31 August 1943

After the start of World War II, the Japanese garrison stationed on the island consisted of the 742-man Minamitorishima Guard Unit, under the command of Rear Admiral Masata Matsubara, and the 2,005-man 12th Independent Mixed Regiment of the Imperial Japanese Army, under the command of Colonel Yoshiichi Sakata. The United States Navy bombed it repeatedly in 1942 and in 1943, but never attempted to capture it. The island was featured in the 1944 U.S. film The Fighting Lady.

Japan was able to resupply the garrison by submarine, using a channel, still visible today, cut through the reef on the northwest side of the island. The island was subject to repeated U.S. air attacks during World War II, and finally surrendered when the destroyer USS Bagley arrived on 31 August 1945.

=== U.S. occupation ===
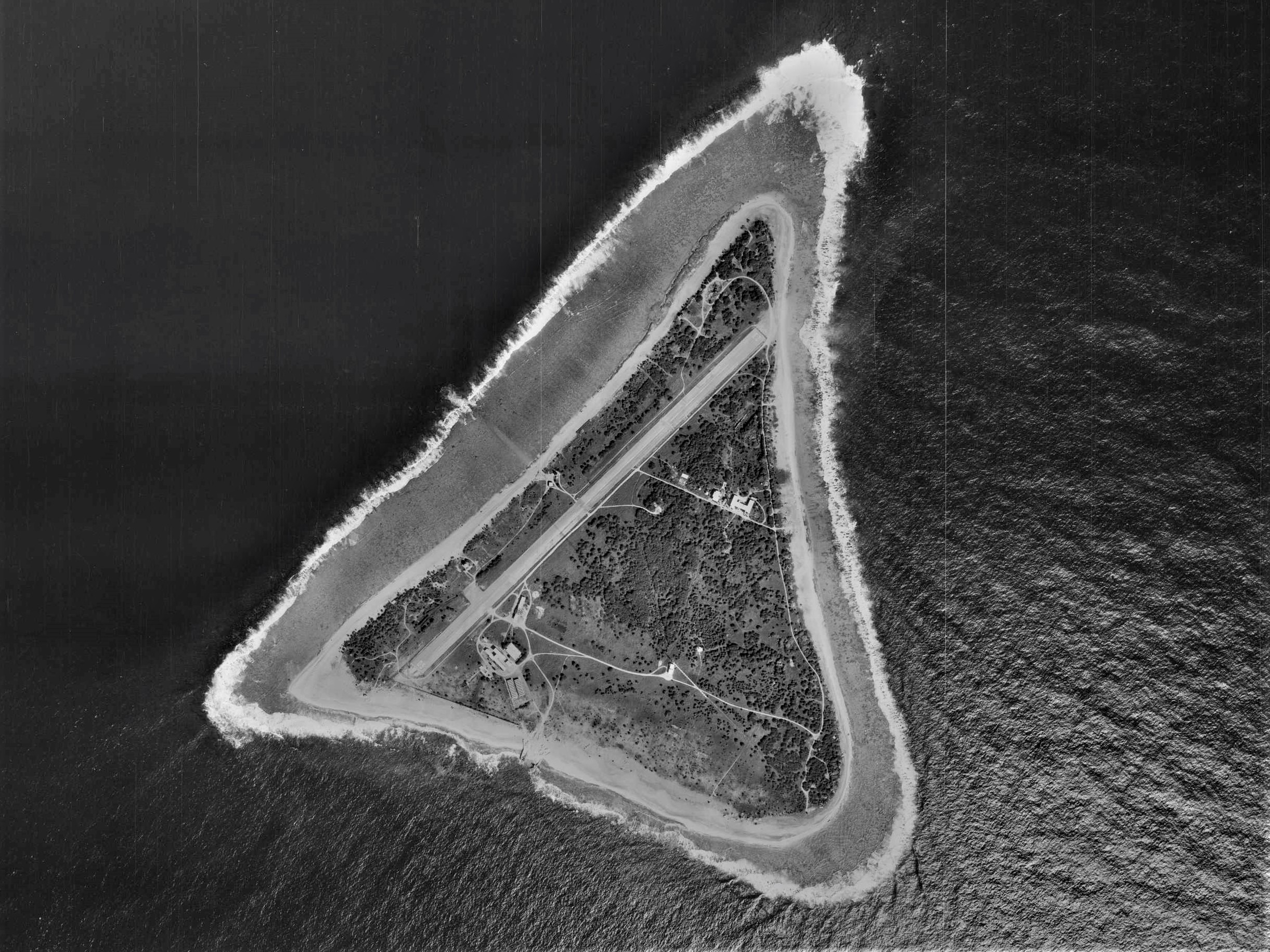
Minamitorishima in 1975

The Treaty of San Francisco transferred the island to American control in 1952. (Note: Article 3 of the Treaty of San Francisco: "Japan will concur in any proposal of the United States to the United Nations to place under its trusteeship system, with the United States as the sole administering authority, Nansei Shoto south of 29° north latitude (including the Ryukyu Islands and the Daito Islands), Nanpo Shoto south of Sofu Gan (including the Bonin Islands, Rosario Island and the Volcano Islands) and Parece Vela and Marcus Island. Pending the making of such a proposal and affirmative action thereon, the United States will have the right to exercise all and any powers of administration, legislation, and jurisdiction over the territory and inhabitants of these islands, including their territorial waters.") The island was returned to Japanese control in 1968, but the Americans retained control of the airstrip and LORAN-C station.

In 1964, after some delays caused by storms that ravaged the island during construction, the U.S. Coast Guard opened a LORAN-C navigation station on Minamitorishima, whose mast was until 1985 one of the tallest structures in the Pacific area, at 411 m (1,350 ft). Before replacing Loran A for general marine navigation, Loran C was used by submarine-launched Polaris missile systems. The existence and location of Loran C stations was classified.

LORANSTA Marcus Island was billeted for 23 US Coast Guard personnel. The commissioning commanding officer was U.S. Coast Guard Lieutenant Commander Louis. C. Snell. A detachment of SeaBees remained on the island for several months making repairs to the island's airstrip.

Coast Guardsmen stationed on the island served one-year tours that were later modified to allow an R&R visit to mainland Japan at the six-month point. At the end of this isolated tour of duty, crew members received an additional 30 days of compensatory leave.

While under U.S. administration, the island was resupplied by air. During the Vietnam War, the weekly logistic flight was a DC-6 flight conducted by the CIA-operated Air America. Later, a C-130 Hercules from the 345th Tactical Airlift Squadron, Yokota Air Base, Japan, resupplied the island on missions every Thursday. Coast Guardsmen often amused themselves by judging aircraft landings, raising placards painted with large numbers.

An unusually long four-hour ground time was scheduled to allow technicians who flew in to perform maintenance on the transmitter, and to offload extra fuel from the C-130 to power the island's generator. It allowed the Coast Guardsmen to read and answer letters, while aircrews snorkeled and collected green glass fishing buoys that had washed up on the shore.

=== Resumed Japanese administration ===
The Marcus Island station was transferred from the U.S. Coast Guard to the Japan Maritime Self Defense Force (JMSDF) in September 1993 and was closed in December 2009.

The island is used for weather observation and has a radio station, but little else. The JMSDF garrison was supplied by C-130s from Iruma Air Base, or by C-130s from Haneda or Atsugi Air Base, with flights via Iwo Jima on a weekly basis. The runway of Minami Torishima Airport is only 1,300 m (4,300 ft) long and cannot handle large aircraft.

== Climate ==
Minamitorishima has a tropical savanna climate (Köppen climate classification Aw), with warm to hot temperatures throughout the year. The wettest months are July and August. The driest months are February and March. It has the highest average temperature in Japan, at 25 °C (77 °F). Temperature extremes range from 13.8 °C (56.8 °F) on February 10, 1976, to the highest, at 35.6 °C (96.1 °F) on July 17, 1951.

Climate data for Minami-Torishima (1991−2020 normals, extremes 1951−present)
Month	Jan	Feb	Mar	Apr	May	Jun	Jul	Aug	Sep	Oct	Nov	Dec	Year
Record high °C (°F)	29.7 (85.5)	29.0 (84.2)	30.2 (86.4)	31.9 (89.4)	34.0 (93.2)	35.0 (95.0)	35.6 (96.1)	34.7 (94.5)	35.3 (95.5)	33.5 (92.3)	34.2 (93.6)	31.6 (88.9)	35.6 (96.1)
Mean maximum °C (°F)	27.6 (81.7)	27.3 (81.1)	28.3 (82.9)	29.8 (85.6)	31.4 (88.5)	32.8 (91.0)	33.2 (91.8)	32.6 (90.7)	32.3 (90.1)	31.7 (89.1)	30.5 (86.9)	29.1 (84.4)	33.5 (92.3)
Mean daily maximum °C (°F)	24.6 (76.3)	24.3 (75.7)	25.3 (77.5)	27.1 (80.8)	29.0 (84.2)	31.0 (87.8)	31.3 (88.3)	31.0 (87.8)	30.9 (87.6)	30.2 (86.4)	28.7 (83.7)	26.7 (80.1)	28.3 (82.9)
Daily mean °C (°F)	22.4 (72.3)	21.8 (71.2)	22.5 (72.5)	24.3 (75.7)	26.1 (79.0)	28.0 (82.4)	28.5 (83.3)	28.4 (83.1)	28.5 (83.3)	27.9 (82.2)	26.5 (79.7)	24.5 (76.1)	25.8 (78.4)
Mean daily minimum °C (°F)	20.3 (68.5)	19.6 (67.3)	20.4 (68.7)	22.3 (72.1)	24.1 (75.4)	25.8 (78.4)	26.1 (79.0)	26.1 (79.0)	26.4 (79.5)	25.9 (78.6)	24.7 (76.5)	22.6 (72.7)	23.7 (74.7)
Mean minimum °C (°F)	17.2 (63.0)	16.9 (62.4)	17.3 (63.1)	19.4 (66.9)	21.6 (70.9)	23.5 (74.3)	23.9 (75.0)	23.9 (75.0)	24.2 (75.6)	23.7 (74.7)	22.4 (72.3)	19.4 (66.9)	16.1 (61.0)
Record low °C (°F)	13.9 (57.0)	13.8 (56.8)	14.2 (57.6)	16.4 (61.5)	19.1 (66.4)	20.0 (68.0)	21.6 (70.9)	21.8 (71.2)	21.7 (71.1)	20.8 (69.4)	19.2 (66.6)	16.7 (62.1)	13.8 (56.8)
Average precipitation mm (inches)	69.7 (2.74)	43.4 (1.71)	56.0 (2.20)	59.6 (2.35)	100.6 (3.96)	44.3 (1.74)	139.8 (5.50)	177.1 (6.97)	94.8 (3.73)	89.6 (3.53)	83.0 (3.27)	90.8 (3.57)	1,052.8 (41.45)
Average precipitation days (≥ 0.5 mm)	10.9	8.5	8.1	7.8	9.3	7.2	14.8	16.7	14.1	12.7	10.4	11.8	132.7
Average relative humidity (%)	70	70	74	79	79	77	77	79	79	78	76	74	76
Mean monthly sunshine hours	170.8	179.4	222.3	240.2	275.1	311.2	276.3	248.1	254.6	250.8	211.0	182.3	2,821.7
Source: Japan Meteorological Agency

See or edit raw graph data.

== See also ==
- Geography of Japan
- Japanese archipelago
- List of extreme points of Japan
- Imperial Japanese Navy Land Forces
- List of reefs
