= Lamprocystis hahajimana =

Conservation status
- Endangered (IUCN 2.3)

Scientific classification
- Kingdom: Animalia
- Phylum: Mollusca
- Class: Gastropoda
- Order: Stylommatophora
- Family: Microcystidae
- Genus: Lamprocystis
- Species: L. hahajimana

Binomial name
- Lamprocystis hahajimana (Pilsbry, 1902)

Species of gastropod

Lamprocystis hahajimana is a species of small air-breathing land snail, a terrestrial pulmonate gastropod mollusc in the family Euconulidae, the hive snails.

This species is endemic to Japan. The specific epithet is taken from the name of the island Hahajima.
