= Cocoa production in Japan =

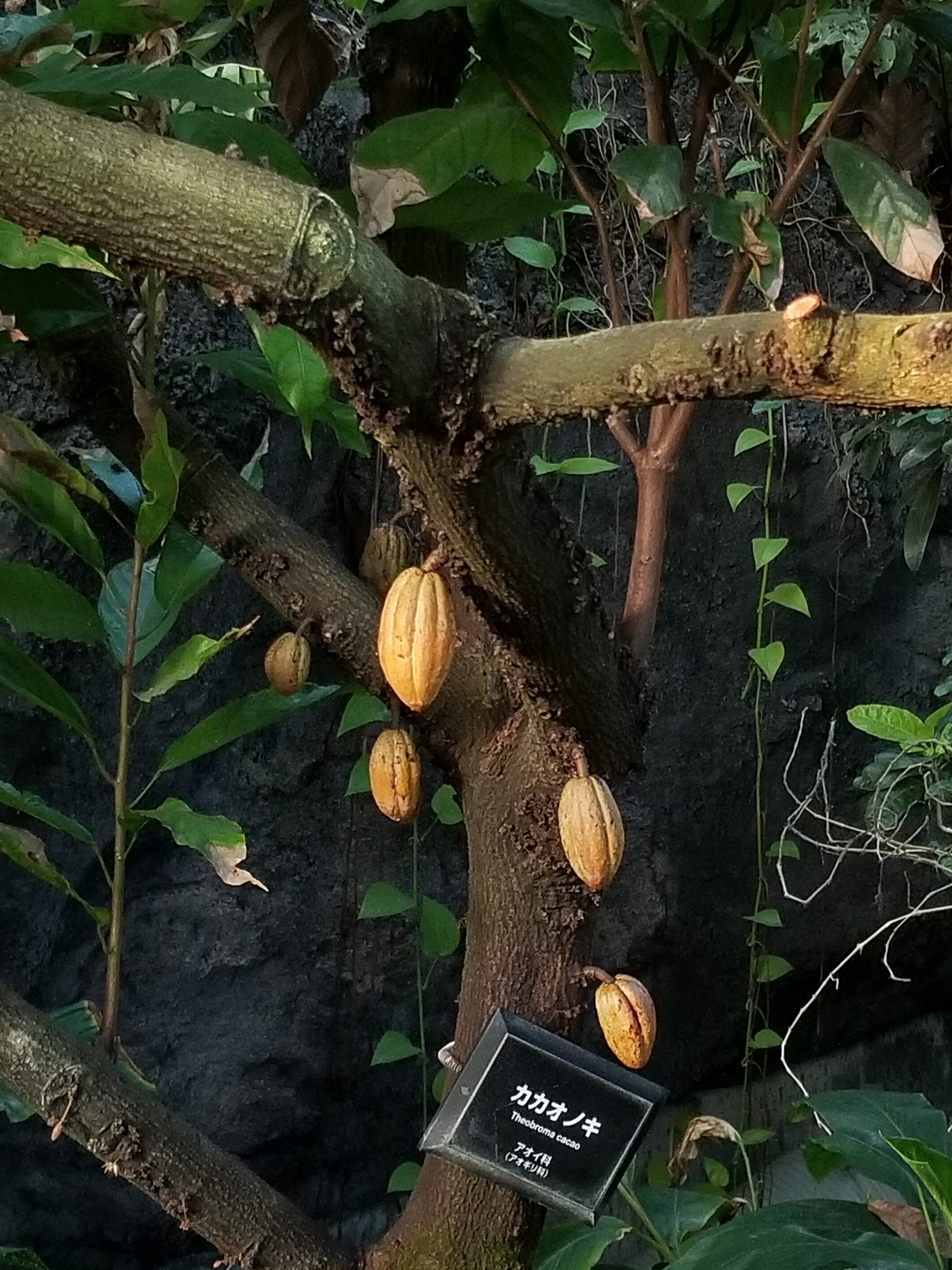
Cocoa pods on the cocoa tree (Theobroma cacao) inside the Shinjuku Gyo-en Greenhouse in Tokyo

Cocoa production in Japan is limited to the subtropical islands of Hahajima (of the Ogasawara Islands) and Okinawa (of the Ryukyu Islands). The Sōka-based Hiratsuka Confectionery Company was the first to attempt domestic cocoa production in Japan, with cultivation on Hahajima beginning in earnest in 2011. The company's "Tokyo Cacao" bean-to-bar products are marketed as being made from Tokyo-sourced cocoa, as Hahajima is administratively a part of the metropolis. Cocoa cultivation on Okinawa is a relatively newer operation, with chocolates made from Okinawan-sourced cocoa only being announced in 2025.

== Background ==
Cocoa first arrived in Japan with Dutch traders during the Edo period, but the mass production and consumption of chocolate in Japan did not begin until the latter half of the 20th century. The cocoa tree (Theobroma cacao), a tropical plant, cannot be grown on the Japanese mainland. However, small-scale cocoa farms have been attempted on Hahajima of the Ogasawara Islands and Okinawa of the Ryukyu Islands, which have warmer, subtropical climates.

== Hahajima ==
"We have prioritized romance over business sense. Growing cacao in Japan was the dream."

— Masayuki Hiratsuka on the development of "Tokyo Cacao"

Masayuki Hiratsuka, president of the Hiratsuka Confectionery Company based in Sōka, Saitama Prefecture, was the first person to seriously propose the production of cocoa in Japan. He conceived of the idea after a 2003 research trip to Ghana, where he saw cocoa trees in person for the first time. The company sent another research team to Vietnam in 2006, in order to study the cocoa production process. In 2010, he began looking for potential cocoa farmers in Hahajima, a subtropical island under the administration of Tokyo, despite being almost 1,000 kilometres (620 mi) south of the city centre. According to Hiratsuka, he chose Hahajima because it was a part of Tokyo, which "has brand power comparable to New York, Paris, and London".

The following year, Hiratsuka partnered with Kazuo Orita, a leading farmer on Hahajima who was the first to grow lemons and mangoes on the island. Hiratsuka spent ¥110 million on the construction of wind-resistant vinyl greenhouses in Hahajima and imported cocoa beans from Indonesia to cultivate. The growth of the cocoa trees was overseen by Orita and took five years of trial and error, which included the loss of 167 seedlings and the creation of specialized environments for the plants. As of 2020, 502 cocoa trees were being grown on Hahajima.

According to Shin Hiraoka, a development officer for the Hiratsuka Confectionery Company, cocoa beans harvested from Hahajima are fermented in a laboratory in Sōka, and each harvest can yield anywhere from 10 to 100 kilograms of beans. The first cocoa harvest on Hahajima was in November 2013, but due to difficulties with the fermentation process, it was not until 2015 that a chocolate made solely from Hahajima cocoa was produced.

In 2019, the Hiratsuka Confectionery Company announced a limited launch of its debut line of commercial products made from Hahajima cocoa, named "Tokyo Cacao". The bean-to-bar chocolates were promoted as being "made in Tokyo" and wholly produced in Japan. In 2022, the Hiratsuka Confectionery Company partnered with Nestlé Japan to create Tokyo Cacao Kit Kats, advertised as being made from "Japanese-grown cocoa" and having "a strong, fruity aroma and mild flavour". The Kit Kats, however, included Ghana as a place of origin for their ingredients.

== Okinawa ==
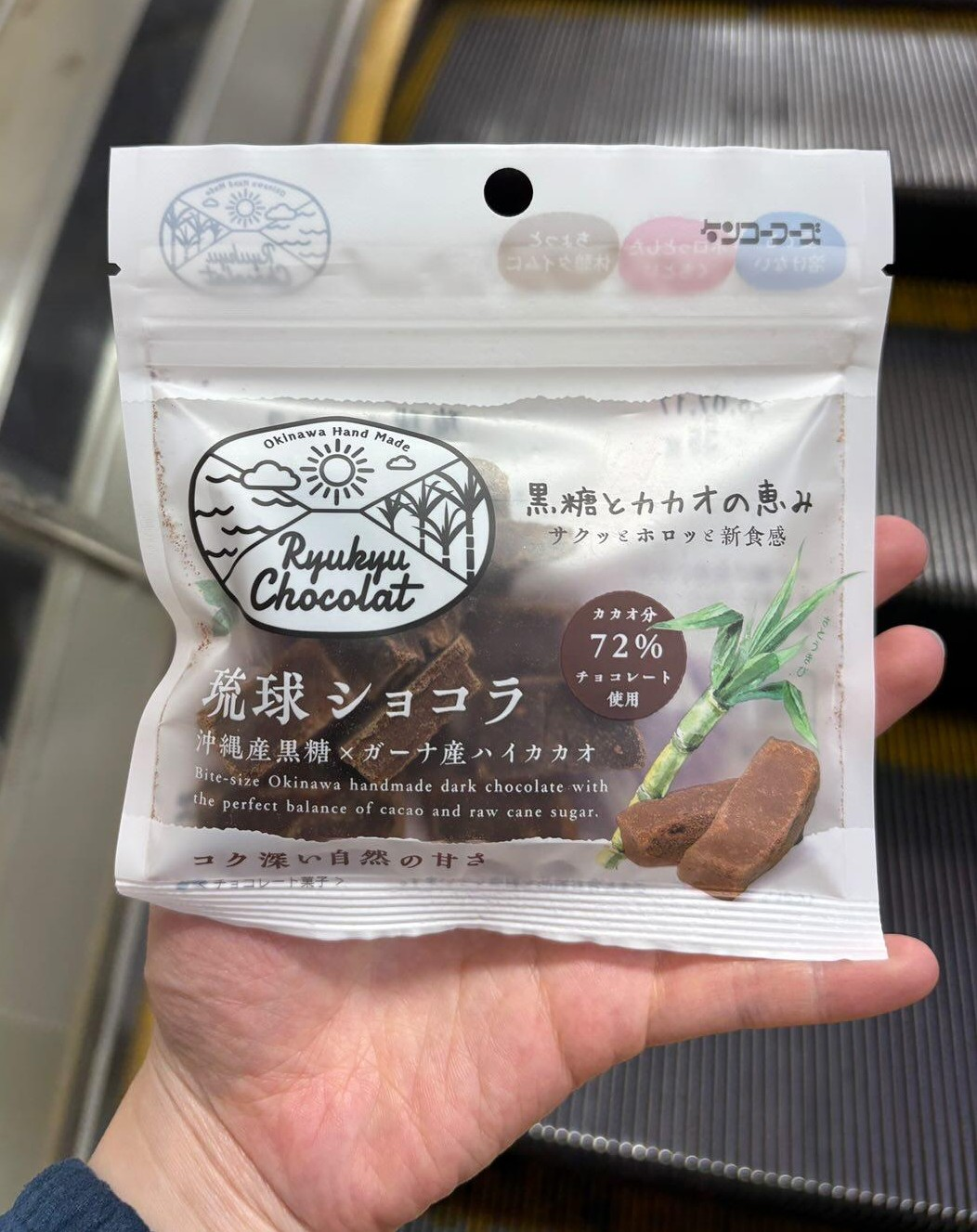
Okinawan dark chocolate handcrafted from locally sourced ingredients

Agriculturist and businessman Kei Kawai began growing cocoa in Ōgimi, a village in the northern rainforest of Okinawa Island (Yambaru), in the spring of 2016, shortly after moving there. He founded a company named Local Landscape to cultivate 2,000 imported cocoa beans in greenhouses and open fields. The cocoa trees bore fruit after six years of trial and error, with a small harvest of 100 cocoa pods (about 10 kilograms) in 2022.

Kawai also runs a chocolate café in Ōgimi named Okinawa Cacao, and stated in 2023 his intention to create and sell chocolate made entirely from Okinawan cocoa once the harvest became large enough. Okinawa Cacao reached this milestone in 2025, when it announced an "all locally produced" chocolate. Previously, "Okinawan chocolate" sold by Okinawa Cacao and other shops on the island had included locally sourced ingredients such as sugarcane, karaki (cinnamon), shiikwaasa (Citrus depressa), and awamori, but the cocoa was imported. Timeless Chocolate, a chocolate café in Chatan, promotes its products as Okinawa's first bean-to-bar chocolate, although its cocoa is not locally sourced.

Minimal – Bean to Bar Chocolate, a chocolate specialty shop in Tokyo, began cultivating cocoa on Okinawa Island in 2021, with its first successful harvest in May 2024.
