= Transit (1817 ship) =

UK merchant and whaling ship 1817–1825

History

United Kingdom
- Name: Transit
- Owner: 1817: Francis Fisher, Bristol; 1820: George Fisher, jr., Francis Fisher jr., Edward Kidd, Francis Fisher, Richard Llewellin Fisher, William Jepson Fisher, all of Bristol; Richard Kidd, Godalming
- Launched: Whitby, 1817
- Fate: Condemned circa 1825

General characteristics
- Tons burthen: 250, or 25031/94 (1820), or 25047/94 (1817) (bm)
- Length: 92 ft 2 in (28.1 m)
- Beam: 25 ft 4 in (7.7 m)
- Sail plan: Full-rigged ship
- Notes: Three masts, flush deck.; 1817: One deck and a half-deck; 1820: Two decks

Transit was launched at Bristol in 1817 and immediately registered at Bristol. Initially she sailed to the Baltic and the Mediterranean. In 1820 she made the first of two voyages as a whaler in the southern whale fishery. She was condemned at Manila circa 1825 during her second whaling voyage.

== Career ==
Transit was first registered at Bristol on 28 February 1817. Captain Hodgson sailed her from Whitby to Riga. She arrived at Riga on 5 April and returned to Whitby on 31 May. She next voyage was to the Mediterranean. She arrived at Malta on 25 August and returned to Bristol on 16 November.

She first appeared in online copies of Lloyd's Register in 1818.

Year	Master	Owner	Trade	Source
1818	Hodgson	F.Fisher	Bristol–Malta	LR

On 12 July 1818 Transit arrived at Bristol from Smyrna. From Bristol she sailed to St Petersburg and arrived there on 7 September. She arrived back at Bristol on 25 November. She again sailed to the Mediterranean. On 21 December 1819 Transit returned to Bristol from Constantinople and Malta.

1st whaling voyage (1820–1821): Transit, William Davies, master, left Bristol in February 1820, prior to 21 February. She was reported to have been at 33°N 38°W on 5 May 1820. On 12 August 1821 Transit, of Bristol, Davis, master, was at Saint Helena with 140 tons of whale oil. She arrived back at Bristol on 8 October 1821.

On 7 December 1821 Captain James Alexander took command of Transit.

2nd whaling voyage (1822–loss): Transit, Alexander, master, sailed from Bristol on 26 January 1822. A letter from Batavia dated 31 May 1823 reported that Transit had come into Batavia from Ambonya on 18 May. Transit was under the command of Dickson, acting master, and under a military guard. She had come into Ambonya after the death of Captain Alexander. A whale had killed him off Christmas Island. After his death a dispute among the crew had led them to go to Ambonya to get assistance in settling the dispute. As neither the mate nor any other members of the crew were qualified to take command of Transit, a new master, James Coffin, was found. He was expected to sail back to Bristol without delay. James Coffin was an American, from Nantucket.

Instead of returning to Bristol, Captain Coffin continued to engage in whaling. In December 1823 Transit was at Guam.

On 12 September 1824 Transit visited the southern group (Coffin Islands) of the Bonin Islands. Coffin named the largest island Fisher Island, and the second largest Kidd Island.

Transit visited the Bonin Islands again in 1825 but this time she was at the middle group of islands (Beechey Group).

On 21 June 1825 Transit, Coffin, master, was at Manila with 600 barrels of whale oil. She had been refitted and was ready for sea.

== Fate ==
Lloyd's List reported in June 1826, that Transit had been condemned at Manila. Her entry in the Bristol registry was closed in 1826.
