= Minami Torishima Airport =

Japanese airport

Minami Torishima Airbase
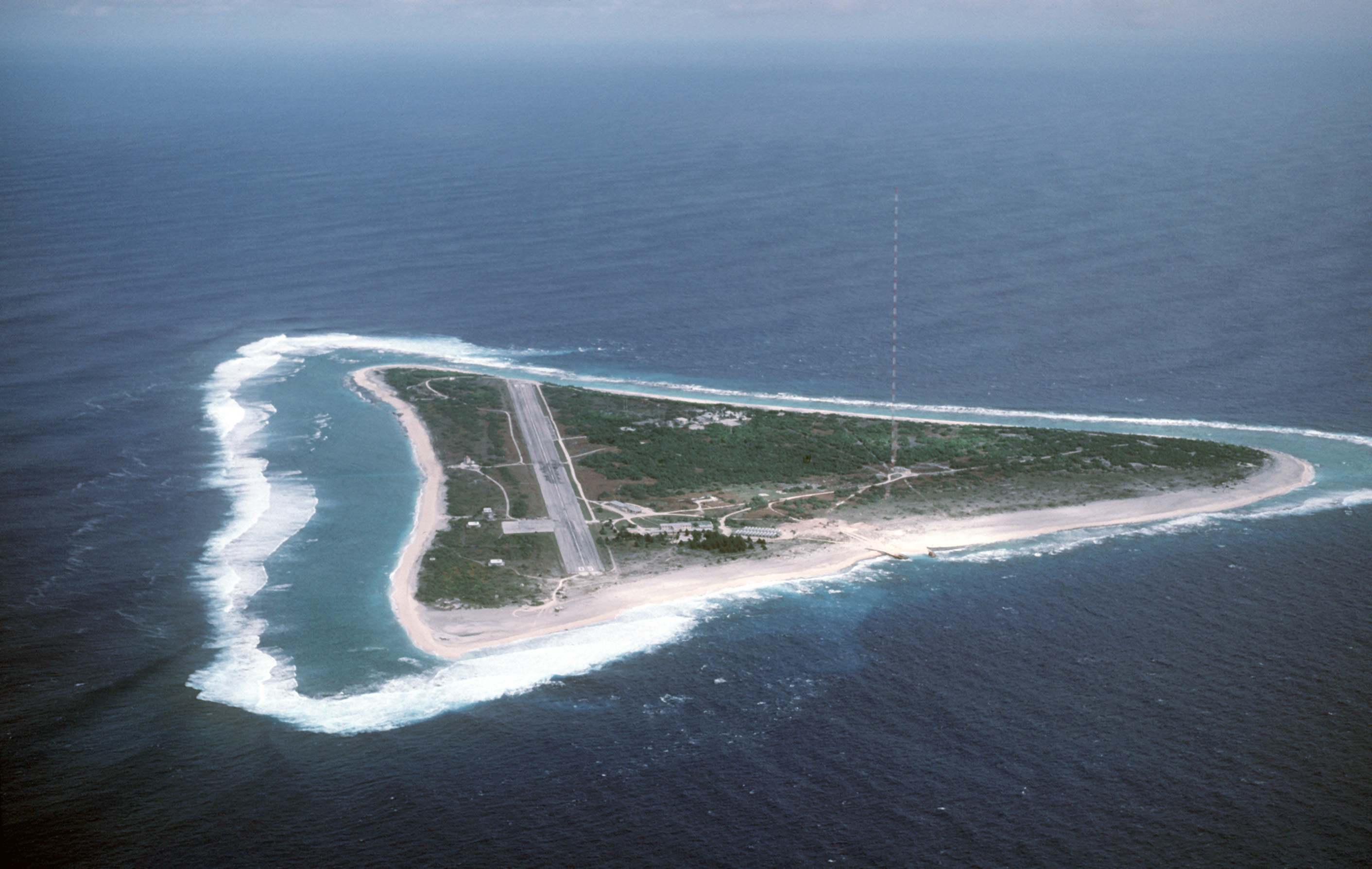
- Minami Torishima Airbase in view on the island, Minami Torishima
- IATA: MUS; ICAO: RJAM

Summary
- Airport type: Military
- Operator: Japan Maritime Self-Defense Force
- Serves: Minami Torishima
- Elevation AMSL: 22 ft / 7 m
- Coordinates: 24°17′23″N 153°58′45″E

Map
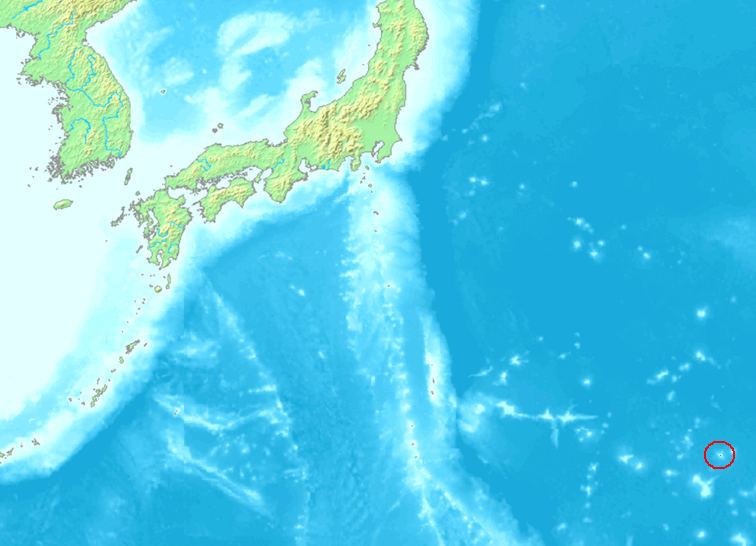
- Location

Runways
Direction	Length		Surface
Direction	m	ft	Surface
05/23	1,371	4,498	Concrete
- Source: Japanese AIP at AIS Japan

Minami Torishima Airbase (南鳥島航空基地, Minami Torishima Kōkūkichi) is a one runway airport serving the island of Minami Torishima, Japan. The aerodrome used to be a military airstrip and according to the Japanese Aeronautical Information Service, is still operated by the Japan Maritime Self-Defense Force.

== History ==
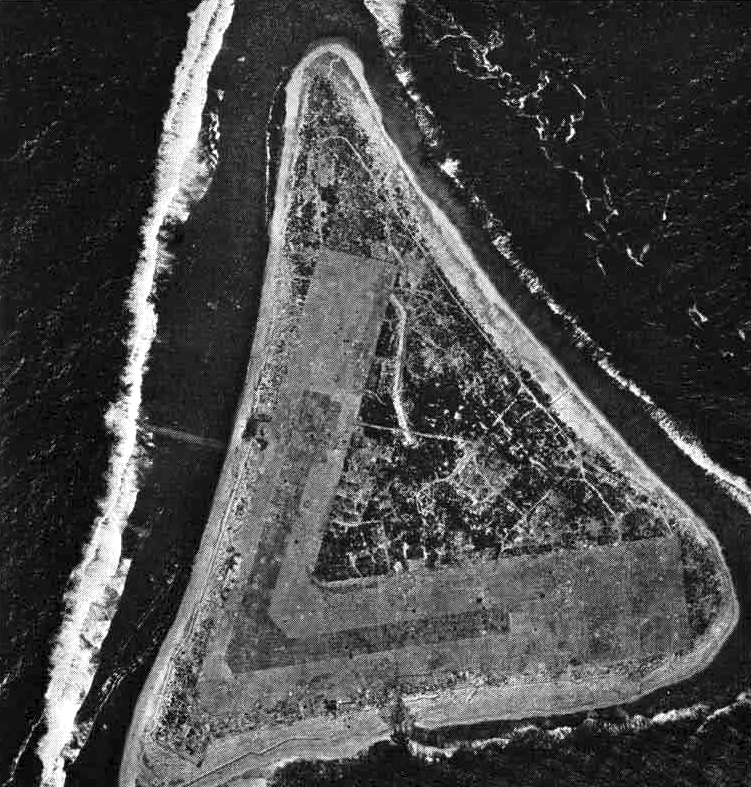
View of original airstrip in 1945

The airstrip existence dates to 1935 when the Imperial Japanese Navy built one to serve a meteorological station. The original airfield consisted of two airstrips (cleared area of 4000' and 4500', but only shorter sections used as landing area) in a v-shaped formation.

The airstrips facilities were damaged by US bombing of the island during World War II, and was re-built with a single runway by the United States Naval Mobile Construction Battalion 9 in 1964. Until 1993, the airstrip was used and controlled by the United States Coast Guard to service the nearby LORAN-C station.

In 2009 the airstrip was transferred to the Japan Maritime Self-Defense Force which currently retains control of the airstrip. It is used by the Japan Meteorological Agency to service and staff their operations on the island.
