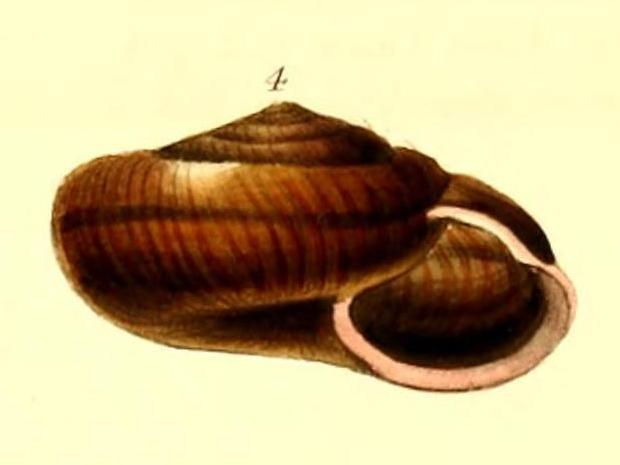
- Type figure of Mandarina luhuana

Conservation status
- Data Deficient (IUCN 2.3)

Scientific classification
- Kingdom: Animalia
- Phylum: Mollusca
- Class: Gastropoda
- Order: Stylommatophora
- Family: Camaenidae
- Genus: Mandarina
- Species: M. luhuana

Binomial name
- Mandarina luhuana (Sowerby I, 1839)

Synonyms
- Helix luhuana Sowerby, 1839; Mandarina luhuana (Sowerby, 1839); Nanina ruschenbergeri Pilsbry, 1890; Mandarina ruschenbergeri (Pilsbry, 1890)

= Mandarina luhuana =

Extinct species of gastropod

Mandarina luhuana is an extinct species of air-breathing land snail, a terrestrial pulmonate gastropod mollusk in the family Bradybaenidae. This species is endemic to Chichi-jima and Minami-jima of the Bonin Islands in Japan.

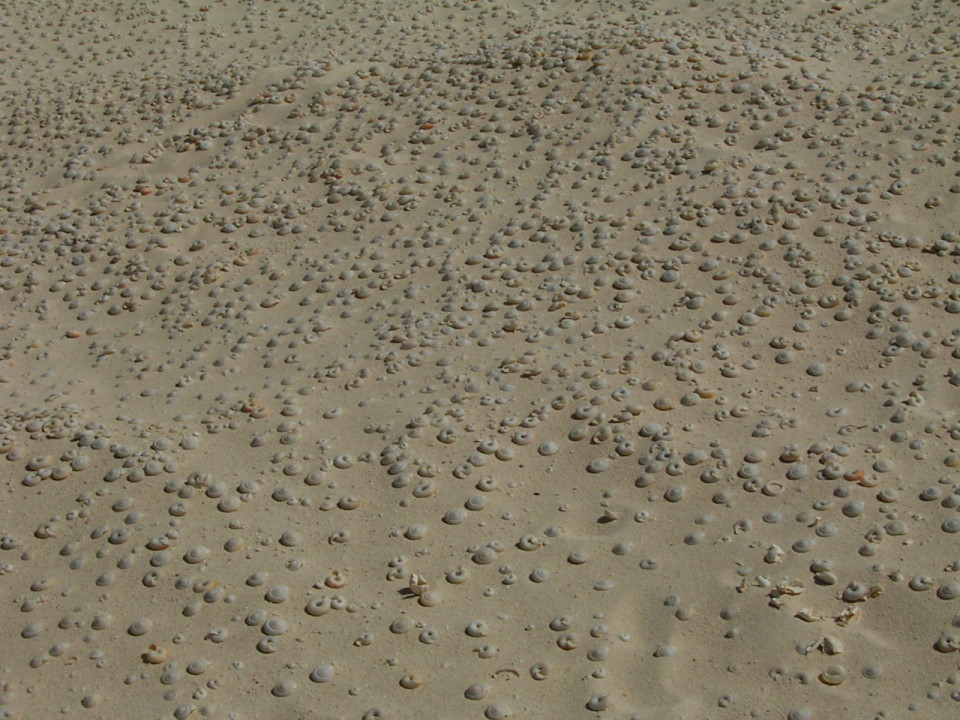
Subfossils of Mandarina luhuana at Minami-jima, Bonin Islands

== Subspecies ==
- Mandarina luhuana luhuana (Sowerby, 1839)
- Mandarina luhuana minamijima Chiba, 2007
