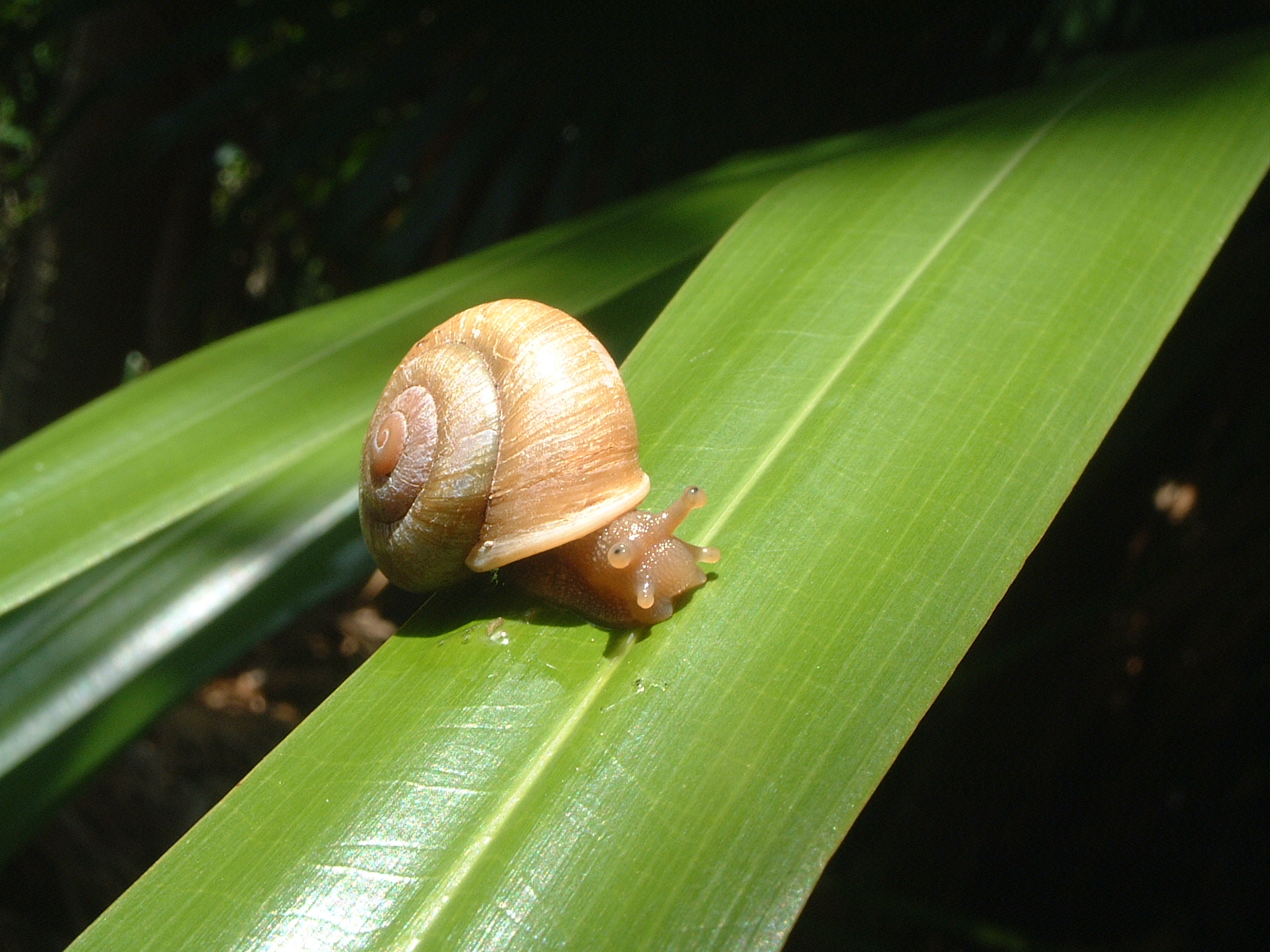
- Mandarina hirasei
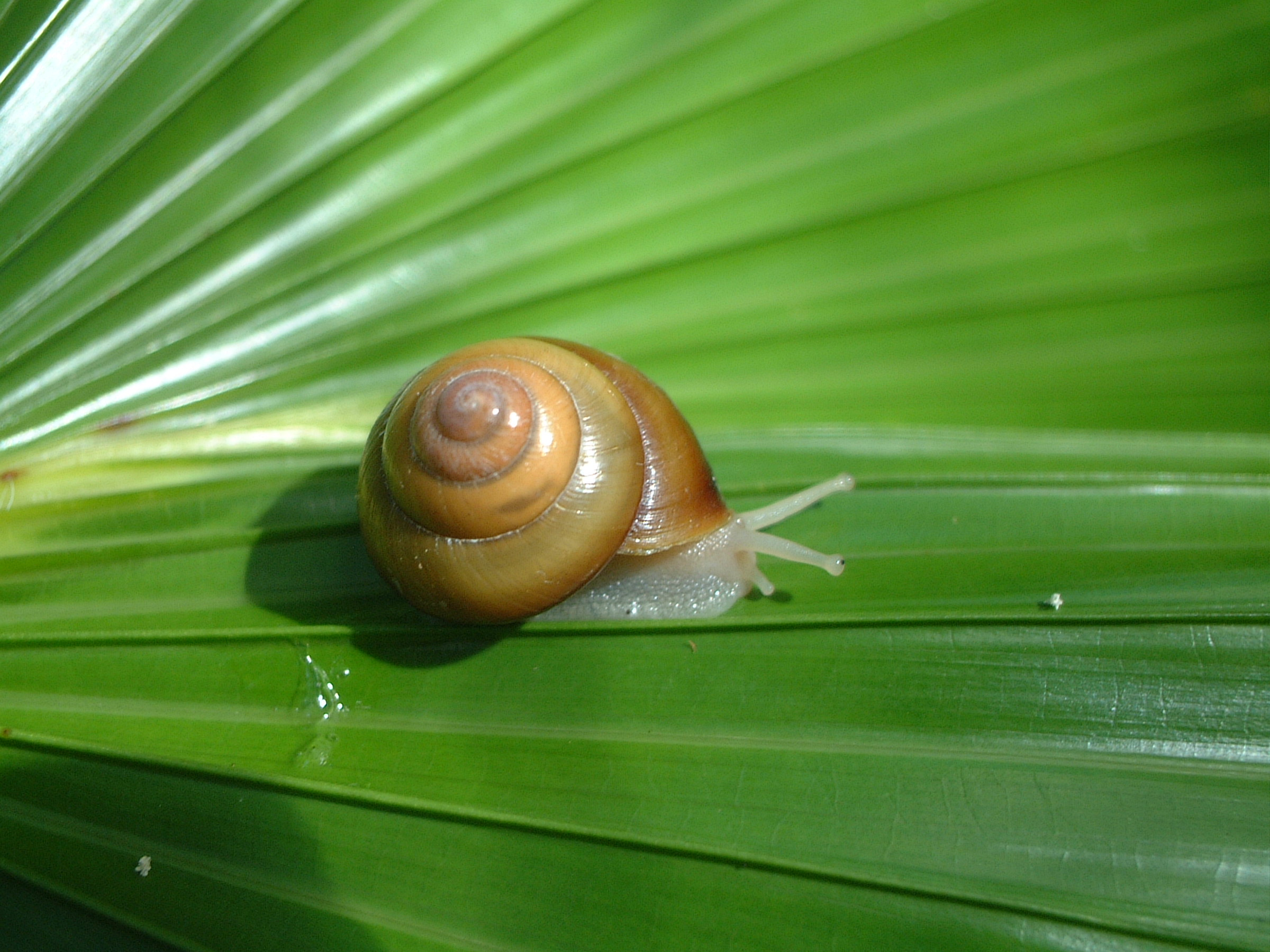
- Mandarina suenoae

Scientific classification
- Kingdom: Animalia
- Phylum: Mollusca
- Class: Gastropoda
- Order: Stylommatophora
- Family: Camaenidae
- Subfamily: Bradybaeninae
- Genus: Mandarina; Pilsbry, 1894

Diversity
- 17 species, 5 of them are extinct

= Mandarina =

Genus of gastropods

Mandarina is a genus of air-breathing land snail, a terrestrial pulmonate gastropod mollusk in the family Camaenidae, subfamily Bradybaeninae.

Mandarina have been traditionally placed within Camaenidae. Phylogenic study by Chiba (1999) have found, that Mandarina is closely related to Euhadra (family Bradybaenidae) and that Mandarina have probably evolved from Euhadra.

== Distribution ==
The genus Mandarina is endemic to Ogasawara Islands.

== Description ==
The shell is solid. The width of the shell is 15–80 mm.

== Species ==
Species within the genus Mandarina include:

- Mandarina anijimana
- Mandarina aureola
- Mandarina chichijimana
- Mandarina conus
- Mandarina exoptata
- Mandarina hahajimana
- Mandarina hirasei
- Mandarina luhuana
- Mandarina mandarina
- Mandarina polita
- Mandarina ponderosa
- Mandarina suenoae
- Mandarina trifasciata

== Ecology ==
Mandarina live in various habitats including arboreal, semi-arboreal, ground habitats, wet habitats and dry habitats.
