= Mandarina aureola =

Conservation status
- Data Deficient (IUCN 2.3)

Scientific classification
- Kingdom: Animalia
- Phylum: Mollusca
- Class: Gastropoda
- Order: Stylommatophora
- Family: Camaenidae
- Genus: Mandarina
- Species: M. aureola

Binomial name
- Mandarina aureola Tiba, 1989

Species of gastropod

Mandarina aureola is a species of air-breathing land snail, a terrestrial pulmonate gastropod mollusk in the family Camaenidae. This species is endemic to Japan.
