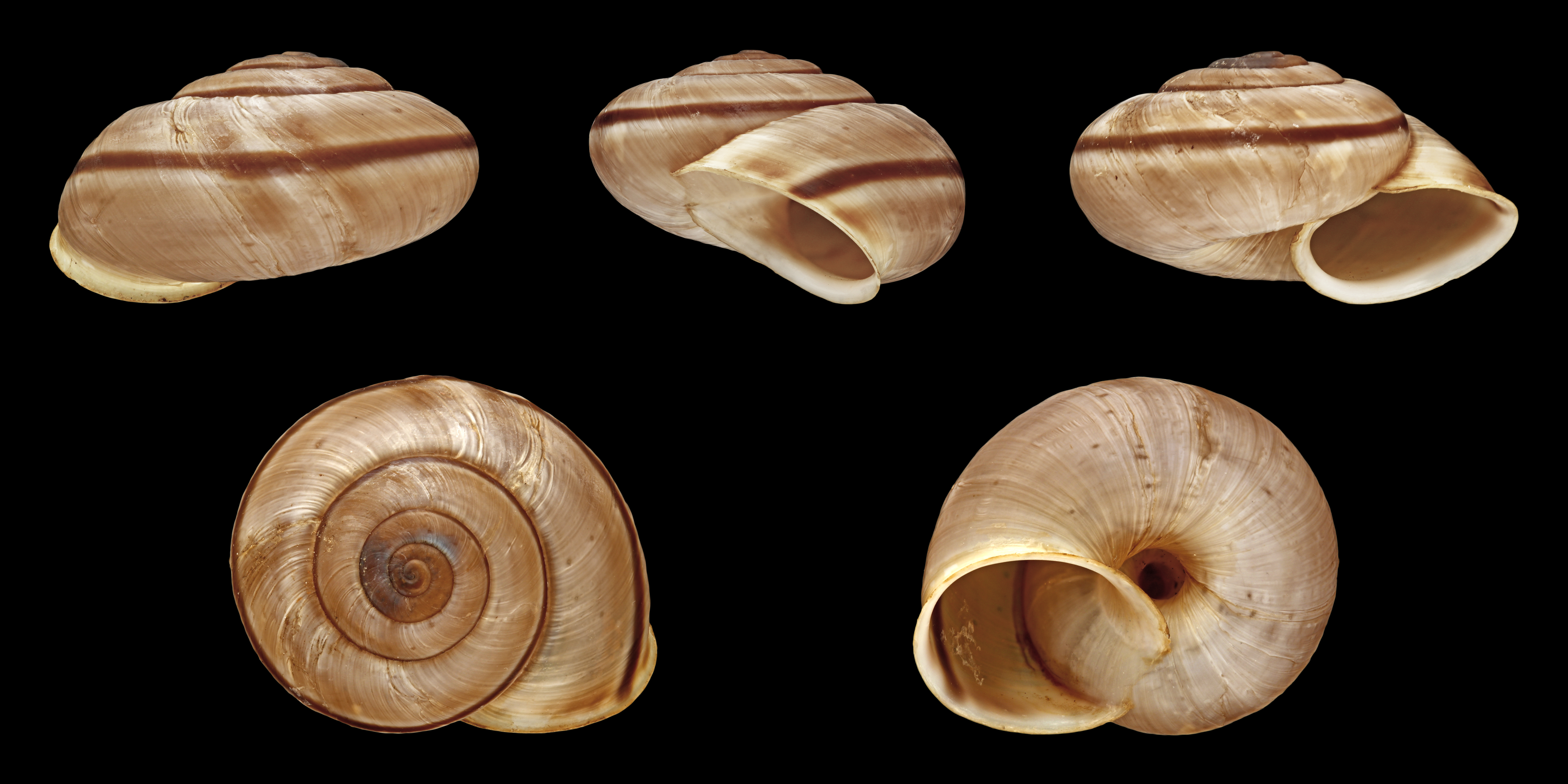
- Chilostoma cingulatum baldense shell

Scientific classification
- Kingdom: Animalia
- Phylum: Mollusca
- Class: Gastropoda
- Order: Stylommatophora
- Family: Helicidae
- Genus: Chilostoma; Fitzinger, 1833

Type species
- Glischrus foetens S. Studer, 1820

Synonyms
- Chilostoma (Achatica) Groenenberg, Subai & Gittenberger, 2016· accepted, alternate representation; Chilostoma (Chilostoma) Fitzinger, 1833· accepted, alternate representation; Chilostoma (Cingulifera) Held, 1838· accepted, alternate representation; Cingulifera Held, 1838 (original rank); Helicigona (Chilostoma) Fitzinger, 1833

= Chilostoma =

Genus of gastropods

Chilostoma is a genus of medium-sized, air-breathing land snails, terrestrial pulmonate gastropod mollusks in the family Helicidae, the true snails.

== Subgenera and species ==
Subgenera and species within the genus Chilostoma include:

- Chilostoma achates (Rossmässler, 1835)
- Chilostoma adelozona (Strobel, 1857)
- Chilostoma cingulatum (Studer, 1820)
- Chilostoma desmoulinsii (Farines, 1834): synonym of Corneola desmoulinsii (Farines, 1834)
- Chilostoma frigidum (De Cristofori & Jan, 1832)
- Chilostoma millieri (Bourguignat, 1880)
- Chilostoma squammatinum (Dupuy, 1848)
- Chilostoma tigrinum (De Cristofori & Jan, 1832)
- Chilostoma zonatum (Studer, 1820)
- subgenus Ariantopsis
  - Chilostoma pelia
- subgenus Campylaea Beck, 1837: synonym of Campylaea H. Beck, 1837
  - Chilostoma illyricum (Stabile, 1864)
  - Chilostoma planospira (Lamarck, 1822): synonym of Campylaea planospira (Lamarck, 1822)
    - Chilostoma planospira benedictum
    - Chilostoma planospira macrostoma
    - Chilostoma planospira occultatum
    - Chilostoma planospira planospira
    - Chilostoma planospira setulosum
- subgenus Cingulifera Held, 1838: synonym of Chilostoma Fitzinger, 1833
- subgenus Corneola
  - Chilostoma acrotricha
  - Chilostoma crombezi
  - Chilostoma desmoulinsii
  - Chilostoma squamatinum
- subgenus Delphinatia P. Hesse, 1931: raised to rank of genus Delphinatia P. Hesse, 1931
  - Chilostoma glaciale (A. Férussac, 1832): synonym of Delphinatia glacialis (A. Férussac, 1832)
  - Chilostoma alpinum (Michaud, 1831): synonym of Delphinatia fontenillii alpina (Michaud, 1831)
- subgenus Dinarica
  - Chilostoma pouzolzii: synonym of Dinarica pouzolzii (Deshayes, 1832)
  - Chilostoma serbica
- subgenus Josephinella
  - Chilostoma apfelbecki
  - Chilostoma argentellei
  - Chilostoma brenskei
  - Chilostoma byshekensis
  - Chilostoma choristochila
  - Chilostoma comythophora
  - Chilostoma conemenosi
  - Chilostoma edlaueri
  - Chilostoma eliaca
  - Chilostoma faueri
  - Chilostoma fuchsi
  - Chilostoma hemonica
  - Chilostoma hirta
  - Chilostoma krueperi
  - Chilostoma lefeburiana
  - Chilostoma moellendorffi
  - Chilostoma phocaea
  - Chilostoma sadleriana
  - Chilostoma stenomphala
  - Chilostoma subaii
  - Chilostoma subzonata
  - Chilostoma zebiana
- subgenus Kosicia Brusina, 1904: synonym of Kosicia Brusina, 1904
  - Chilostoma intermedium (A. Férussac, 1832): synonym of Kosicia intermedia (C. Pfeiffer, 1828)
  - Chilostoma ziegleri (Rossmässler, 1836): synonym of Kosicia ziegleri (Rossmässler, 1836)
- subgenus Wladislawia: synonym of Campylaea (Wladislawia) A. J. Wagner, 1928
  - (valid as Cattania Brusina, 1904)
- subgenus Faustina Kobelt, 1904: synonym of Faustina Kobelt, 1904
  - Chilostoma cingulella (Rossmässler, 1837): synonym of Faustina cingulella (Rossmässler, 1837)
  - Chilostoma rossmaessleri (L. Pfeiffer, 1842): synonym of Faustina rossmaessleri (L. Pfeiffer, 1842)
  - Chilostoma faustina (Rossmässler, 1835) - synonym: Faustina faustina (Rossmässler, 1835)
- subgenus Drobacia Brusina, 1904
  - Chilostoma banaticum (Rossmässler, 1838), see under Drobacia banatica
