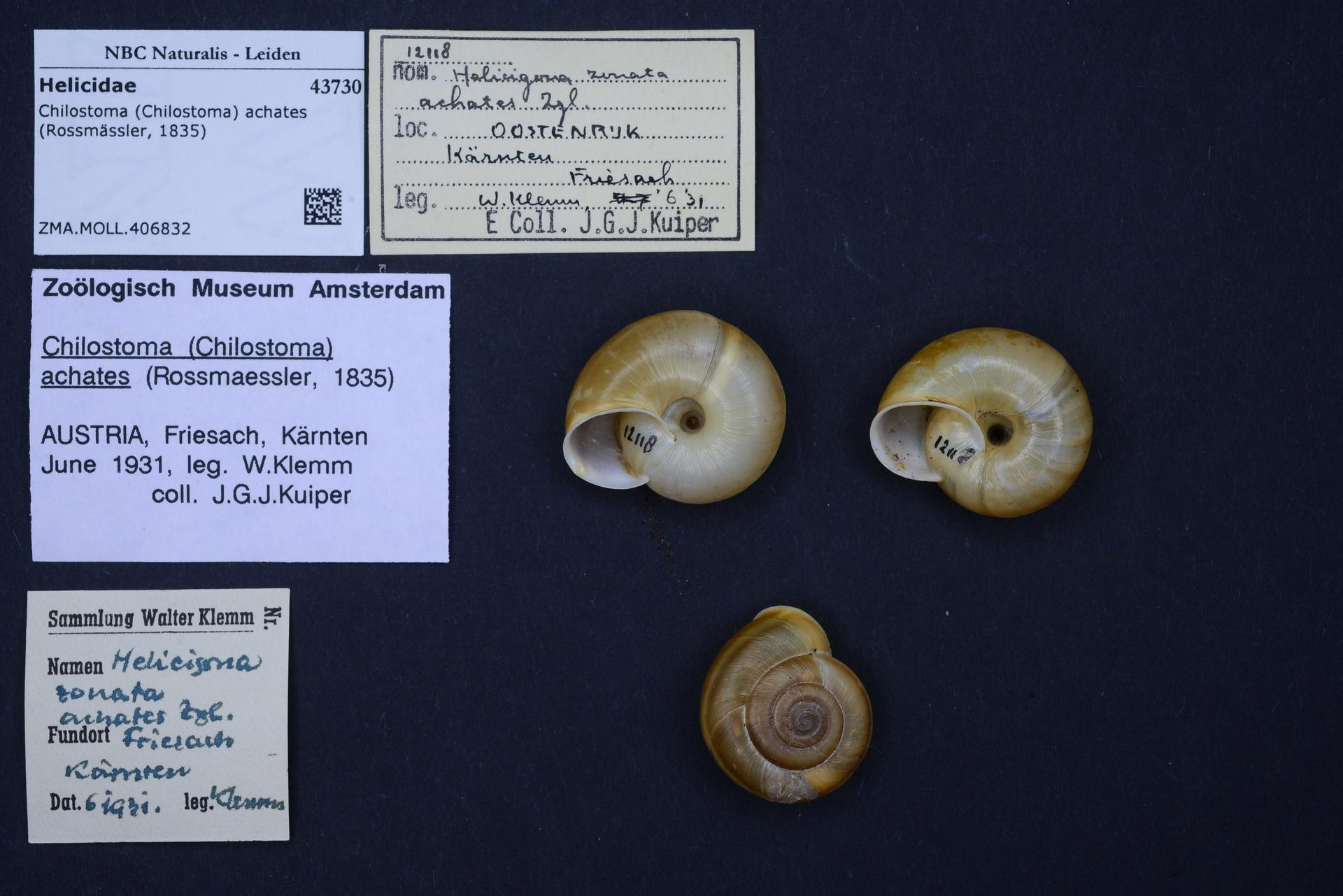
- Chilostoma achates shells

Conservation status
- Near Threatened (IUCN 3.1)

Scientific classification
- Domain: Eukaryota
- Kingdom: Animalia
- Phylum: Mollusca
- Class: Gastropoda
- Order: Stylommatophora
- Family: Helicidae
- Genus: Chilostoma
- Species: C. achates

Binomial name
- Chilostoma achates (Rossmässler, 1835)

= Chilostoma achates =

Species of gastropod

Chilostoma achates is a species of medium-sized, air-breathing, land snail, a terrestrial pulmonate gastropod mollusk in the family Helicidae, the true snails. IUCN has defined the snail as Near threatened, due to the development of tourism. The species inhabits high-altitude limestone environments in the eastern Alps, particularly in South Tyrol and the Carnic Alps of northern Italy, where it grows on damp rock faces and ledges maintained by seepage and snowmelt.

== Taxonomy and nomenclature ==
Chilostoma achates (Rossmässler, 1835) was first introduced as Helix foetens var. achates, one of several varieties then included under a broadly defined H. foetens. In 1933 Lothar Forcart reclassified it as the subspecies Chilostoma zonatum achates, before Carlo Alzona (1971) restored it to full species rank—a treatment still followed by modern checklists.

== Description ==
The shell ranges from 17 to 29 mm across and 7 to 12 mm high. Its colour is a pale yellowish horn, usually bearing a single brown band around the periphery and a paler zone just beneath. There are five gently rounded spiral turns (whorls), separated by a shallow groove called the suture. The final whorl widens markedly before the shell's opening, revealing a broad, slightly off-centre umbilicus (the hollow at the shell's base). The aperture (opening) is set at an angle and bordered by a white lip that is turned back slightly.

== Distribution and habitat ==
This snail occurs in the eastern Alps of northern Italy, with confirmed populations in South Tyrol (Alto Adige) and the Carnic Alps. It inhabits high-altitude limestone environments—sheer or overhanging rock faces, narrow ledges and mixed scree—where continual seepage and residual snowmelt create the damp conditions it requires.
