= Chilostoma albanograeca =

Conservation status
- Least Concern (IUCN 3.1)

Scientific classification
- Kingdom: Animalia
- Phylum: Mollusca
- Class: Gastropoda
- Order: Stylommatophora
- Family: Helicidae
- Genus: Chilostoma
- Species: C. albanograeca

Binomial name
- Chilostoma albanograeca (Subai, 1995)

Species of gastropod

Chilostoma albanograeca is a species of medium-sized, air-breathing, land snail, a terrestrial pulmonate gastropod mollusk in the family Helicidae, the true snails. The species is endemic to Greece, and is defined as a Least-concern species.
