= Chilostoma pelia =

Conservation status
- Least Concern (IUCN 3.1)

Scientific classification
- Kingdom: Animalia
- Phylum: Mollusca
- Class: Gastropoda
- Order: Stylommatophora
- Family: Helicidae
- Genus: Chilostoma
- Species: C. pelia

Binomial name
- Chilostoma pelia (Hesse, 1912)

Species of gastropod

Chilostoma pelia is a species of medium-sized land snail. It is a pulmonate terrestrial gastropod in the family Helicidae, the true snails. The species is endemic to Bulgaria, and is classed as of least-concern.
