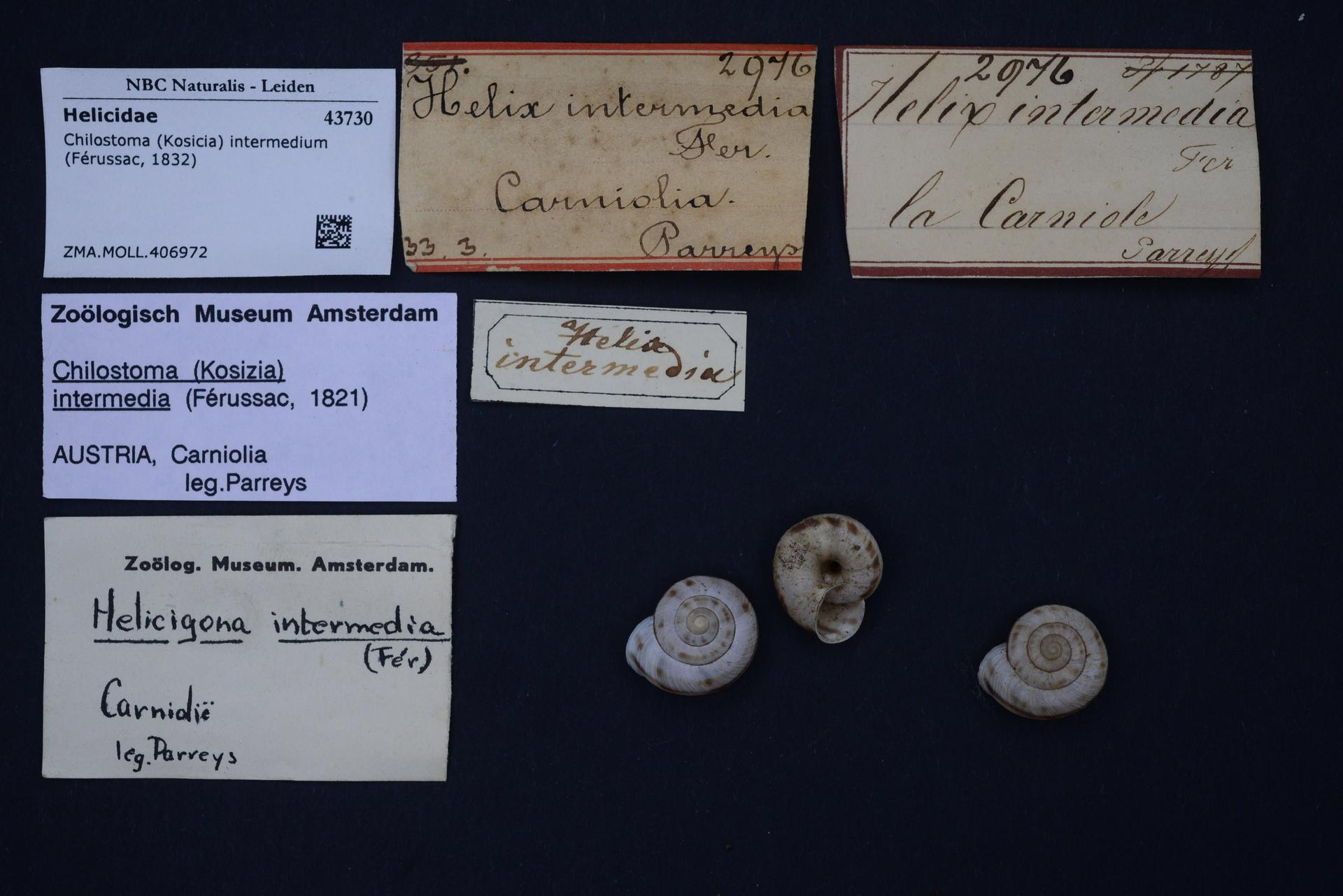
- Chilostoma intermedium shells

Conservation status
- Least Concern (IUCN 3.1)

Scientific classification
- Kingdom: Animalia
- Phylum: Mollusca
- Class: Gastropoda
- Order: Stylommatophora
- Family: Helicidae
- Genus: Chilostoma
- Species: C. intermedium

Binomial name
- Chilostoma intermedium (Férussac, 1832)

= Chilostoma intermedium =

Species of gastropod

Chilostoma intermedium is a species of medium-sized, air-breathing, land snail, a terrestrial pulmonate gastropod mollusk in the family Helicidae, the true snails. The species is endemic to Austria, and is classed as of Least-concern.
