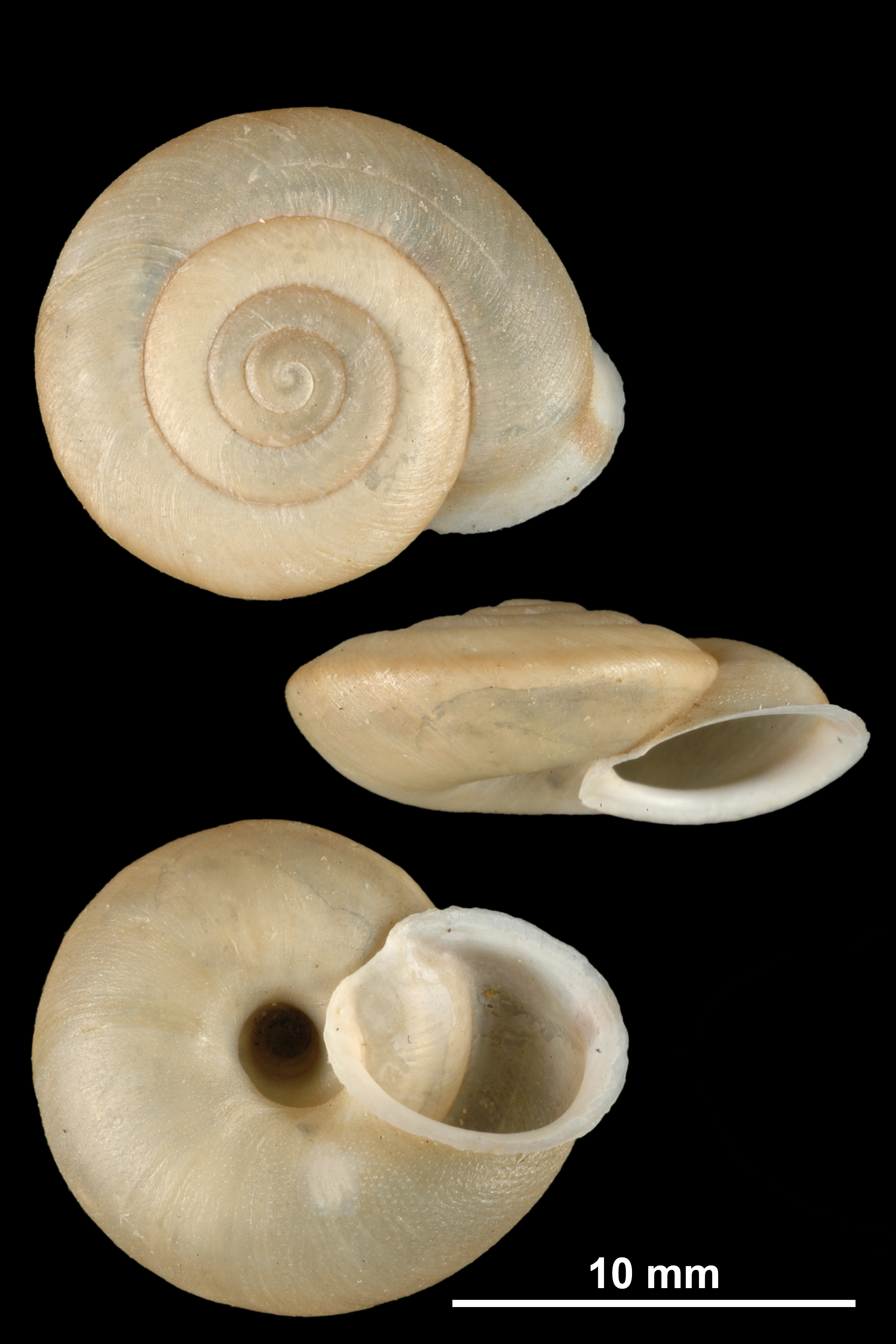
- Shell of Corneola acrotricha (specimen at MNHN, Paris)

Scientific classification
- Kingdom: Animalia
- Phylum: Mollusca
- Class: Gastropoda
- Order: Stylommatophora
- Family: Helicidae
- Genus: Corneola; Held, 1838

Type species
- Helix cornea Draparnaud, 1801

= Corneola =

Genus of gastropods

Corneola is a genus of medium-sized, air-breathing land snails, terrestrial pulmonate gastropod mollusks in the family Helicidae, the true snails.

== Species ==
Species within the genus Corneola include:

- Corneola acrotricha (P. Fischer, 1877)
- Corneola crombezi (Locard, 1882)
- Corneola desmoulinsii (Farines, 1834)
- Corneola squamatina (Rossmässler, 1835)
