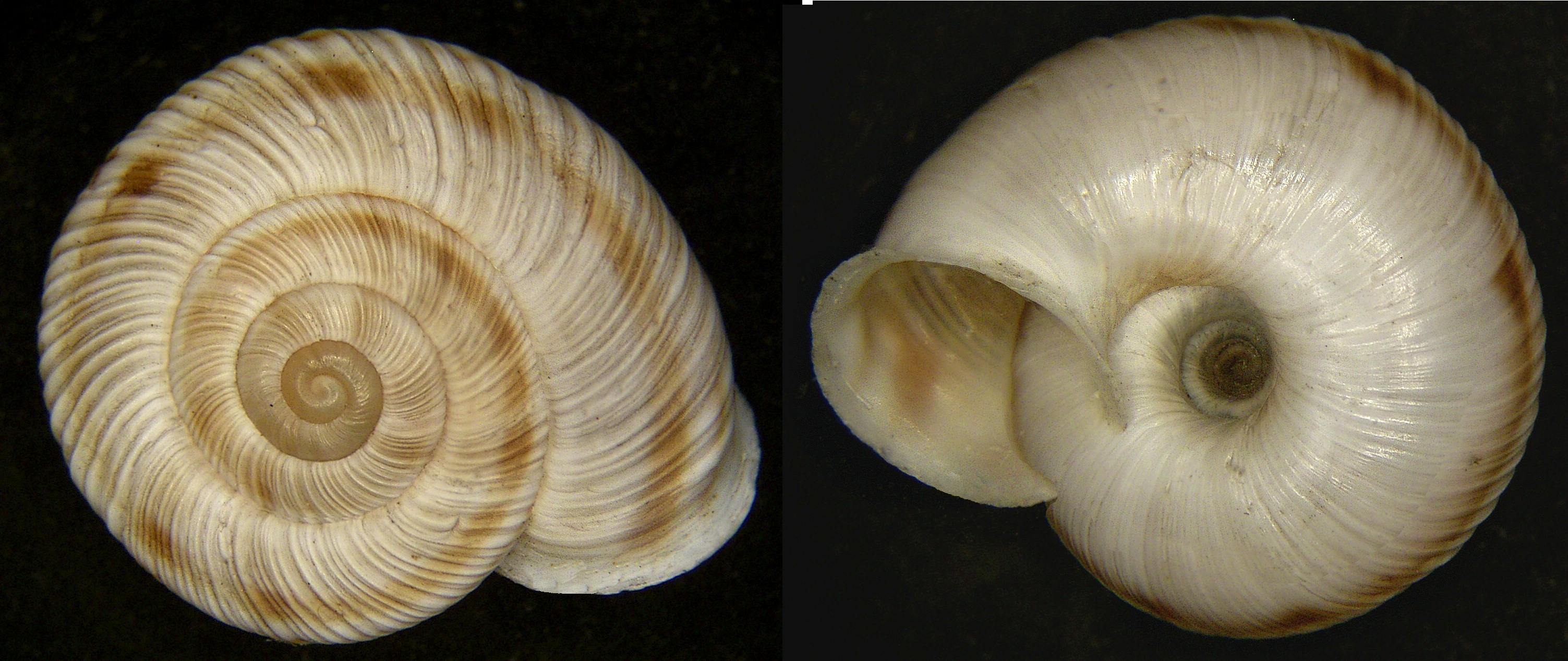

Conservation status
- Near Threatened (IUCN 3.1)

Scientific classification
- Kingdom: Animalia
- Phylum: Mollusca
- Class: Gastropoda
- Order: Stylommatophora
- Family: Helicidae
- Genus: Chilostoma
- Species: C. ziegleri

Binomial name
- Chilostoma ziegleri (Rossmässler, 1836)

= Chilostoma ziegleri =

Species of gastropod

Chilostoma ziegleri is a species of medium-sized, air-breathing land snail, a terrestrial pulmonate gastropod mollusk in the family Helicidae, the true snails. This species occurs in Austria, Italy, and Slovenia.

The threats, if any, to this species are unknown, but it appears to have a declining population.
