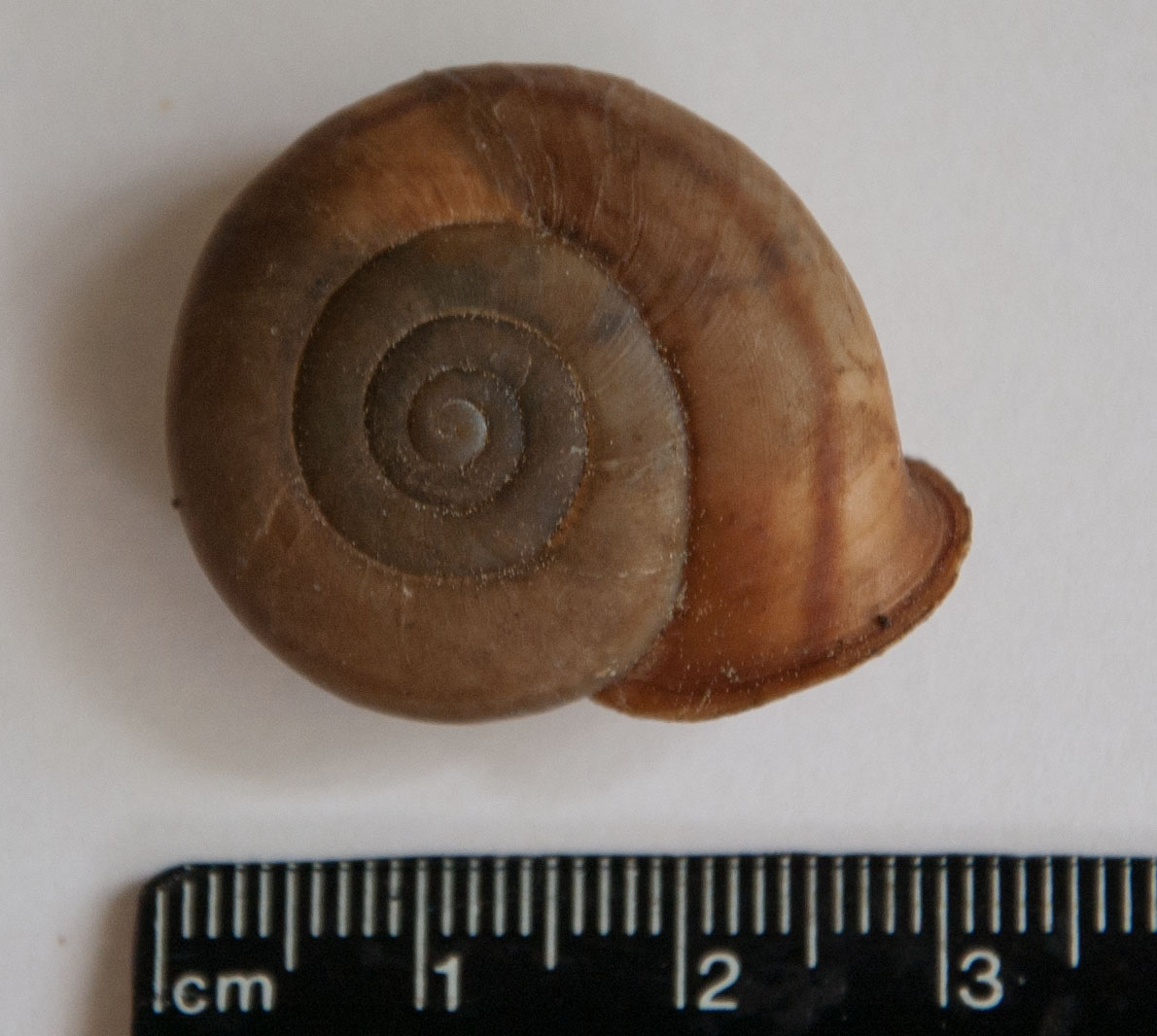

Scientific classification
- Kingdom: Animalia
- Phylum: Mollusca
- Class: Gastropoda
- Order: Stylommatophora
- Family: Helicidae
- Genus: Chilostoma
- Species: C. planospira

Binomial name
- Chilostoma planospira (Férussac, 1832)

= Chilostoma planospira =

Species of gastropod

Chilostoma planospira is a species of medium-sized, air-breathing, land snail, a terrestrial pulmonate gastropod mollusk in the family Helicidae, the true snails.

== Anatomy ==
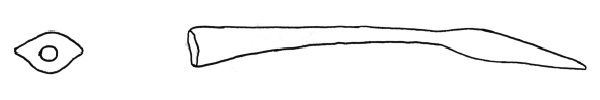
Love dart of Chilostoma planospira.

These snails create and use love darts.

== Taxonomy ==
Subspecies:

- Chilostoma planospira benedictum
- Chilostoma planospira macrostoma
- Chilostoma planospira occultatum
- Chilostoma planospira planospira
- Chilostoma planospira setulosum
