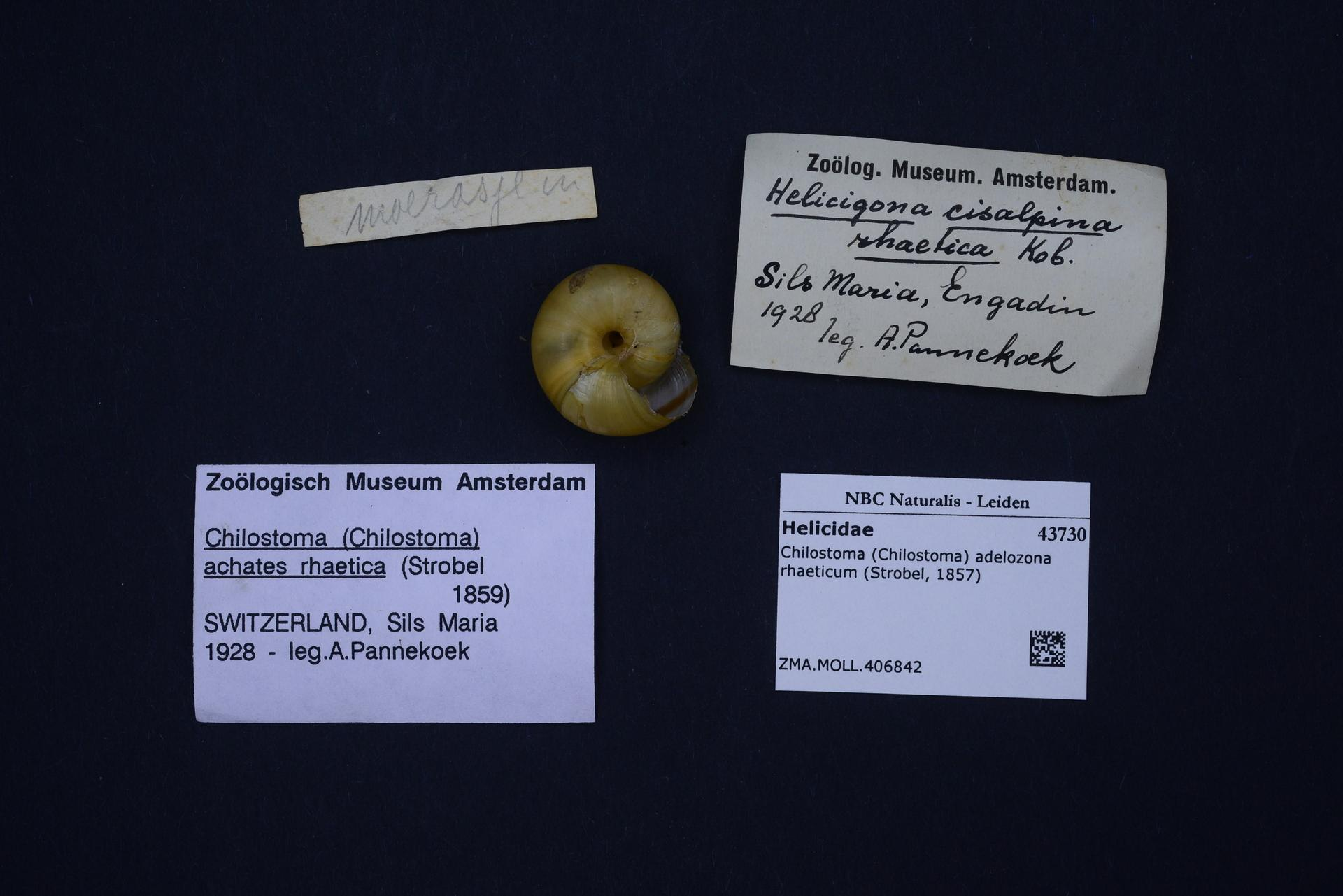
- Chilostoma adelozona shell

Conservation status
- Vulnerable (IUCN 3.1)

Scientific classification
- Domain: Eukaryota
- Kingdom: Animalia
- Phylum: Mollusca
- Class: Gastropoda
- Order: Stylommatophora
- Family: Helicidae
- Genus: Chilostoma
- Species: C. adelozona

Binomial name
- Chilostoma adelozona (Strobel, 1857)

= Chilostoma adelozona =

Species of land snail

Chilostoma adelozona is a species of medium-sized, air-breathing, land snail, a terrestrial pulmonate gastropod mollusk in the family Helicidae, the true snails. The species is endemic to Switzerland, and is currently classified as Vulnerable by the IUCN.

== Taxonomy ==
Although first mentioned by Pellegrino Strobel in 1857 as a variety of Helix foetens, that name was never validly described and is treated as a nomen nudum. In 1864 Guiseppe Stabile provided the first formal description, publishing it under the varietal name Helix foetens var. cisalpina, which later authors elevated to species rank as Chilostoma adelozona (Stabile, 1864). Modern checklists, such as Fauna Europaea, recognise two subspecies: the nominotypical C. adelozona adelozona and C. adelozona rhaeticum.

== Description and variation ==
The shell is broadly tumid—bulging in profile—and measures 16–29 mm across with a height of about 14 mm. It has 4–5 slightly convex whorls (the spiral turns of the shell) separated by a clear suture, and a wide, off-centre umbilicus (the hollow at the shell's base). The overall hue is pale horn-coloured, usually with a faint brown band around the periphery and a paler zone immediately beneath. The aperture (shell opening) is set obliquely and is edged by a white, reflected lip. Populations of the nominotypical subspecies occur mainly on calcareous cliffs between Lake Lugano and Brescia, whereas C. adelozona rhaeticum inhabits talus slopes under heavy boulders—often non-calcareous—in eastern Alpine localities such as Valtellina, around 1,500 metres elevation. Shell form and banding can vary considerably with geography and microhabitat.

== Distribution and habitat ==
Chilostoma adelozona is native to the southern Alps of northern Italy (particularly Lombardy and Alto Adige) and adjacent areas of Switzerland. It favours montane rock habitats—vertical or overhanging faces, rocky outcrops and scree—at elevations from about 1,500 m up to 1,800 m. Moisture for this snail is supplied by seepage from snowmelt and persistent damp crevices, making these cool, shaded rock environments essential for its survival.
