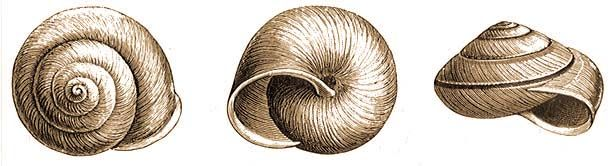
- Three views of a shell of Drobacia banatica

Scientific classification
- Domain: Eukaryota
- Kingdom: Animalia
- Phylum: Mollusca
- Class: Gastropoda
- Order: Stylommatophora
- Family: Helicidae
- Subfamily: Ariantinae
- Genus: Drobacia; Brusina, 1904

= Drobacia =

Genus of gastropods

Drobacia is a genus of medium-sized air-breathing land snails, terrestrial pulmonate gastropod mollusks in the family Helicidae, the typical snails.

This genus was formerly a subgenus of the genus Chilostoma.

== Species ==
Species within the genus Drobacia include:

- Drobacia banatica (Rossmässler, 1838) - type species
- Drobacia maeotica (Wenz, 1926)
