= Carlo Alzona =

Italian medical doctor and biologist

Carlo Alzona (1881 – 1961) was an Italian medical doctor, an entomologist and a malacologist. He was born on 26 May 1881 in Turin. He was the director of the Muséum de Genoa from 1947 to 1955. He specialised in Coleoptera. Alzona died on 14 May 1961 in Genoa.

== Species named after him ==
- Cerastus alzonai Bacci, 1940
- Chilostoma cingulatum alzonai K. L. Pfeiffer, 1951
