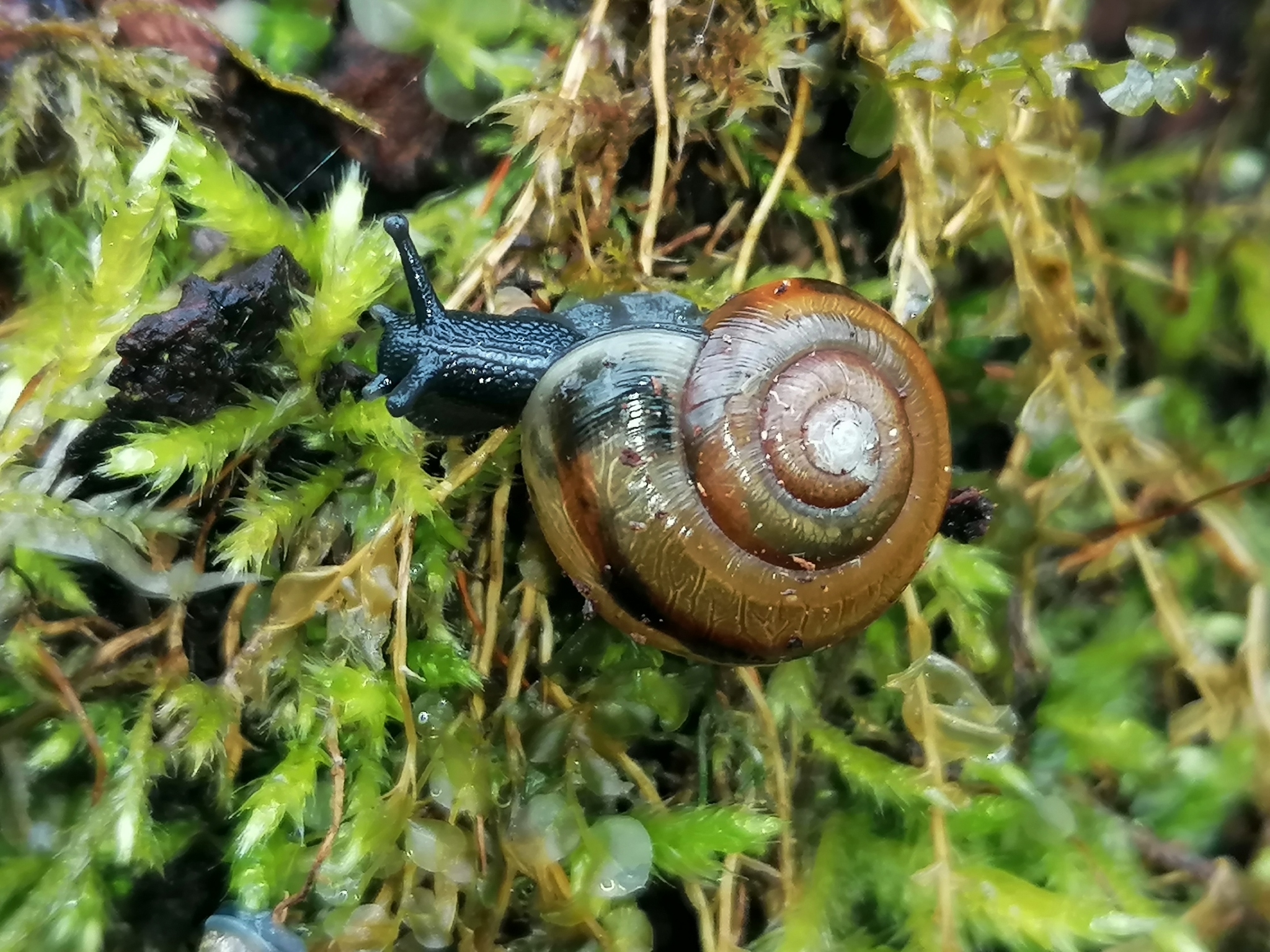
- Faustina faustina

Scientific classification
- Kingdom: Animalia
- Phylum: Mollusca
- Class: Gastropoda
- Order: Stylommatophora
- Family: Helicidae
- Subfamily: Ariantinae
- Genus: Faustina; Kobelt, 1904

Species
- Faustina barcensis (M. Kimakowicz, 1890); Faustina brunneri (Hässlein, 1958) †; Faustina cingulella (Rossmässler, 1837); Faustina faustina (Rossmässler, 1835); Faustina kiralikoeica (M. Kimakowicz, 1890); Faustina rossmaessleri (L. Pfeiffer, 1842)

Synonyms
- Chilostoma (Faustina) Kobelt, 1904

= Faustina (gastropod) =

Genus of gastropods

Faustina is a genus of snails in the family Helicidae.

== Distribution ==
Members of the genus are found across Eastern Europe.
