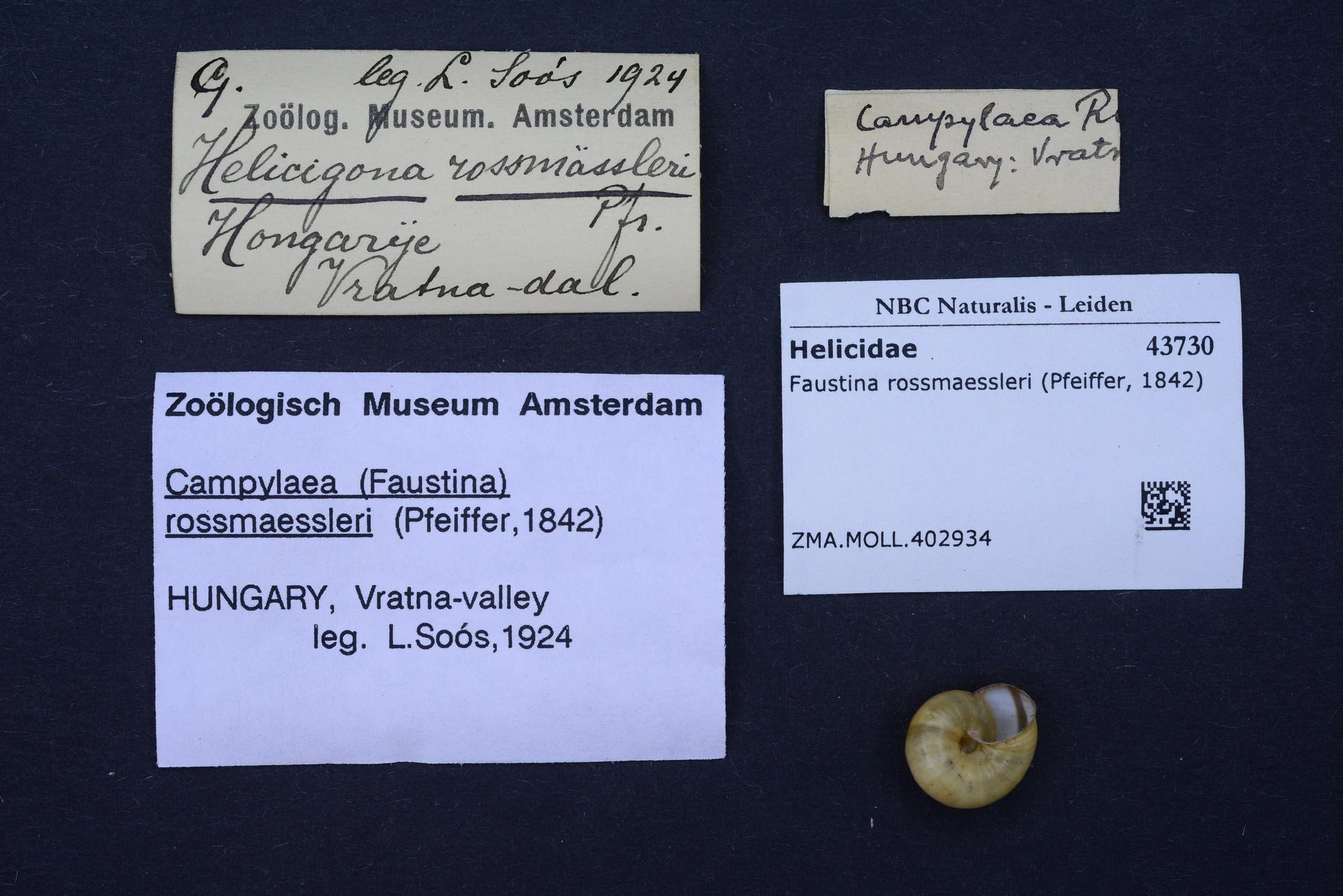
- Helicigona rossmaessleri shell

Conservation status
- Least Concern (IUCN 3.1)

Scientific classification
- Kingdom: Animalia
- Phylum: Mollusca
- Class: Gastropoda
- Order: Stylommatophora
- Family: Helicidae
- Genus: Faustina
- Species: F. rossmaessleri

Binomial name
- Faustina rossmaessleri (Pfeiffer, 1842)

Synonyms
- Chilostoma (Faustina) rossmaessleri (Pfeiffer, 1842); Helix advena Rossmässler, 1842 · unaccepted (invalid; not Webb & Berthelot, 1833); Helix rossmaessleri Pfeiffer, 1842

= Faustina rossmaessleri =

Species of gastropod

Faustina rossmaessleri, also known as Chilostoma rossmaessleri or Helicigona rossmaessleri, is a species of medium-sized, air-breathing land snail, a terrestrial pulmonate gastropod mollusk in the family Helicidae, the true snails.

== Distribution ==
This species is found in Poland and Slovakia.
