= Chilostoma acrotricha =

Conservation status
- Near Threatened (IUCN 3.1)

Scientific classification
- Kingdom: Animalia
- Phylum: Mollusca
- Class: Gastropoda
- Order: Stylommatophora
- Family: Helicidae
- Genus: Chilostoma
- Species: C. acrotricha

Binomial name
- Chilostoma acrotricha (Fischer, 1877)

Species of gastropod

Chilostoma acrotricha is a species of medium-sized, air-breathing, land snail, a terrestrial pulmonate gastropod mollusk in the family Helicidae, the true snails. The species is endemic in France and Spain, and is currently Near threatened.
