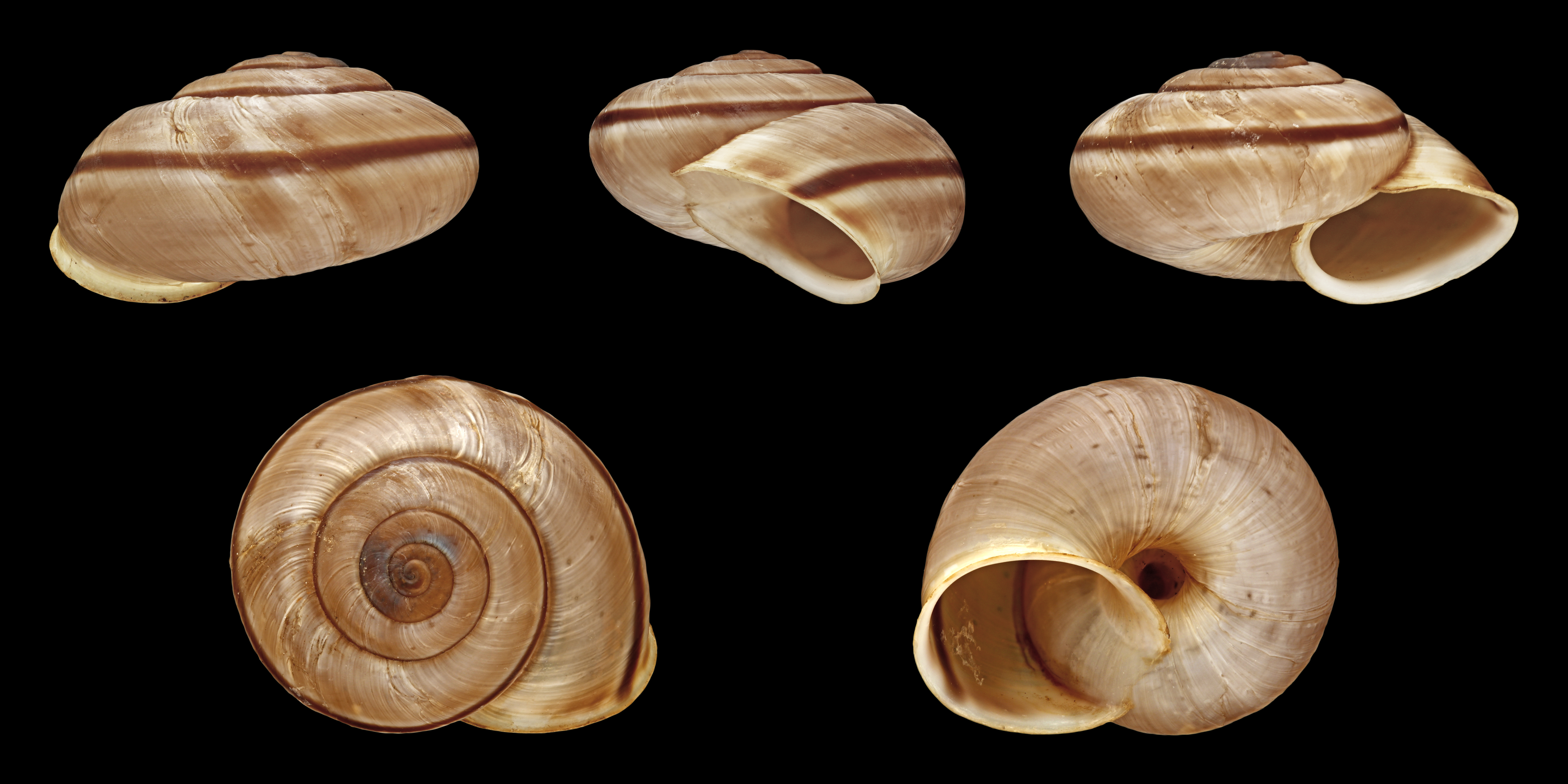
- Chilostoma cingulatum baldense (Rossmässler, 1839)

Scientific classification
- Kingdom: Animalia
- Phylum: Mollusca
- Class: Gastropoda
- Order: Stylommatophora
- Family: Helicidae
- Genus: Chilostoma
- Species: C. cingulatum

Binomial name
- Chilostoma cingulatum (Studer, 1820)

Synonyms
- Chilostoma (Cingulifera) cingulatum (S. Studer, 1820)· accepted, alternate representation; Glischrus cingulata Studer, 1820 (original combination); Helix (Glischrus) cingulata Studer, 1820

= Chilostoma cingulatum =

Species of gastropod

Chilostoma cingulatum is a species of medium-sized, air-breathing land snail, a terrestrial pulmonate gastropod mollusk in the family Helicidae, the true snails.

Subspecies

- Chilostoma cingulatum adamii (Pini, 1876)
- Chilostoma cingulatum alzonai K. L. Pfeiffer, 1951
- Chilostoma cingulatum anauniense (De Betta, 1852)
- Chilostoma cingulatum anconae (Gentiluomo, 1868)
- Chilostoma cingulatum appelii (Kobelt, 1876)
- Chilostoma cingulatum asperulum (Ehrmann, 1910)
- Chilostoma cingulatum baldense (Rossmässler, 1839)
- Chilostoma cingulatum bizona (Rossmässler, 1842)
- Chilostoma cingulatum boccavallense K. L. Pfeiffer, 1951
- Chilostoma cingulatum carrarense (Strobel, 1852)
- Chilostoma cingulatum cingulatum (S. Studer, 1820)
- Chilostoma cingulatum colubrinum (De Cristofori & Jan, 1832)
- Chilostoma cingulatum frigidescens (Del Prete, 1879)
- Chilostoma cingulatum frigidissimum (Paulucci, 1881)
- Chilostoma cingulatum frigidosum (Pollonera, 1890)
- Chilostoma cingulatum gobanzi (Frauenfeld, 1867)
- Chilostoma cingulatum hermesianum (Pini, 1874)
- Chilostoma cingulatum infernale (P. Hesse, 1931)
- Chilostoma cingulatum insubricum (De Cristofori & Jan, 1832)
- Chilostoma cingulatum medoacense (Adami, 1886)
- Chilostoma cingulatum montanum (Paulucci, 1881)
- Chilostoma cingulatum nicatis (Costa, 1836)
- Chilostoma cingulatum nicolisianum (Adami, 1886)
- Chilostoma cingulatum peregrini Falkner, 1998
- Chilostoma cingulatum philippii (Kobelt, 1905)
- Chilostoma cingulatum preslii (Rossmässler, 1836)
- Chilostoma cingulatum sentinense (Piersanti, 1833)
- Chilostoma cingulatum transiens (Adami, 1886)
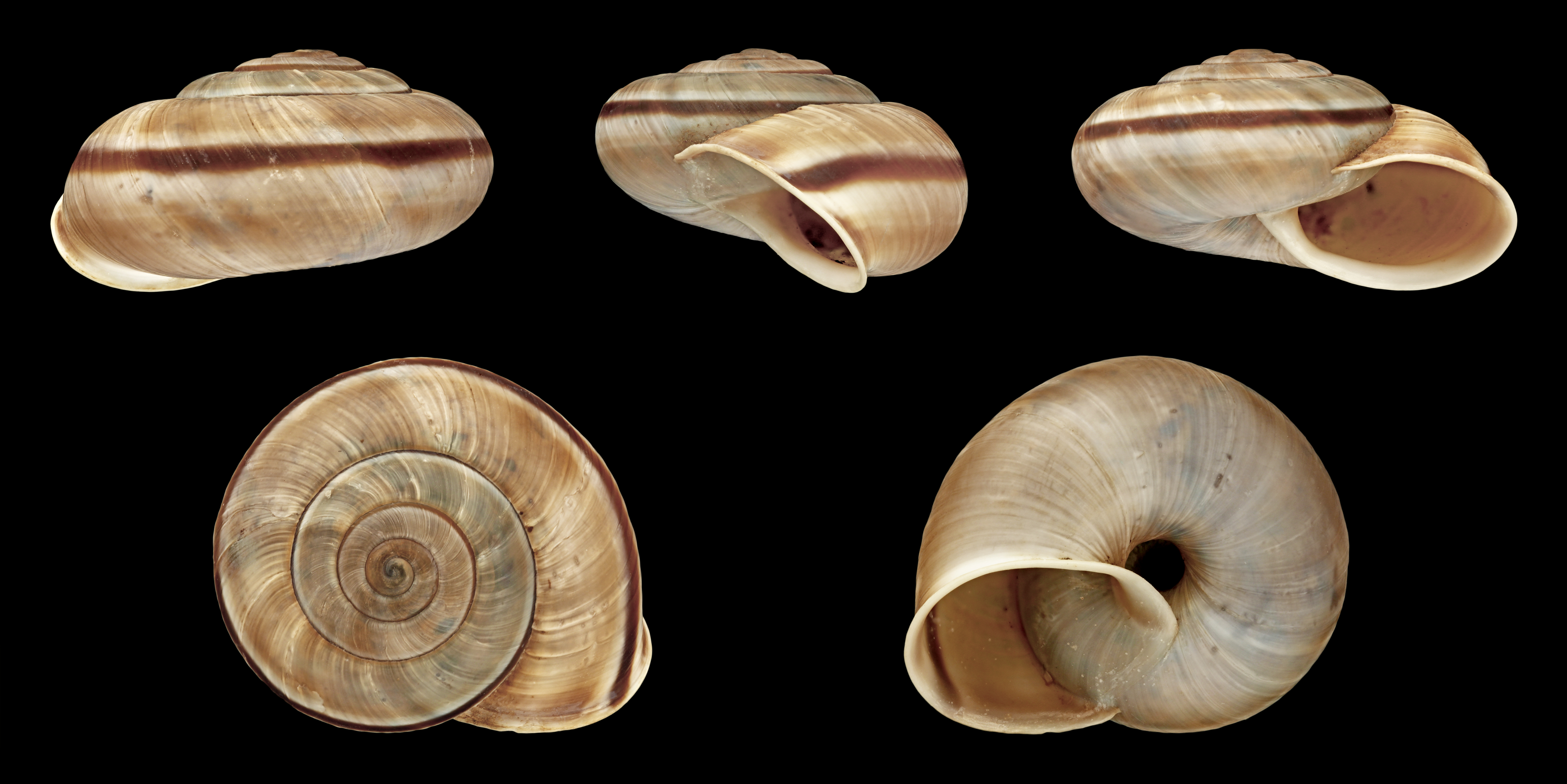
Chilostoma cingulatum anauniense

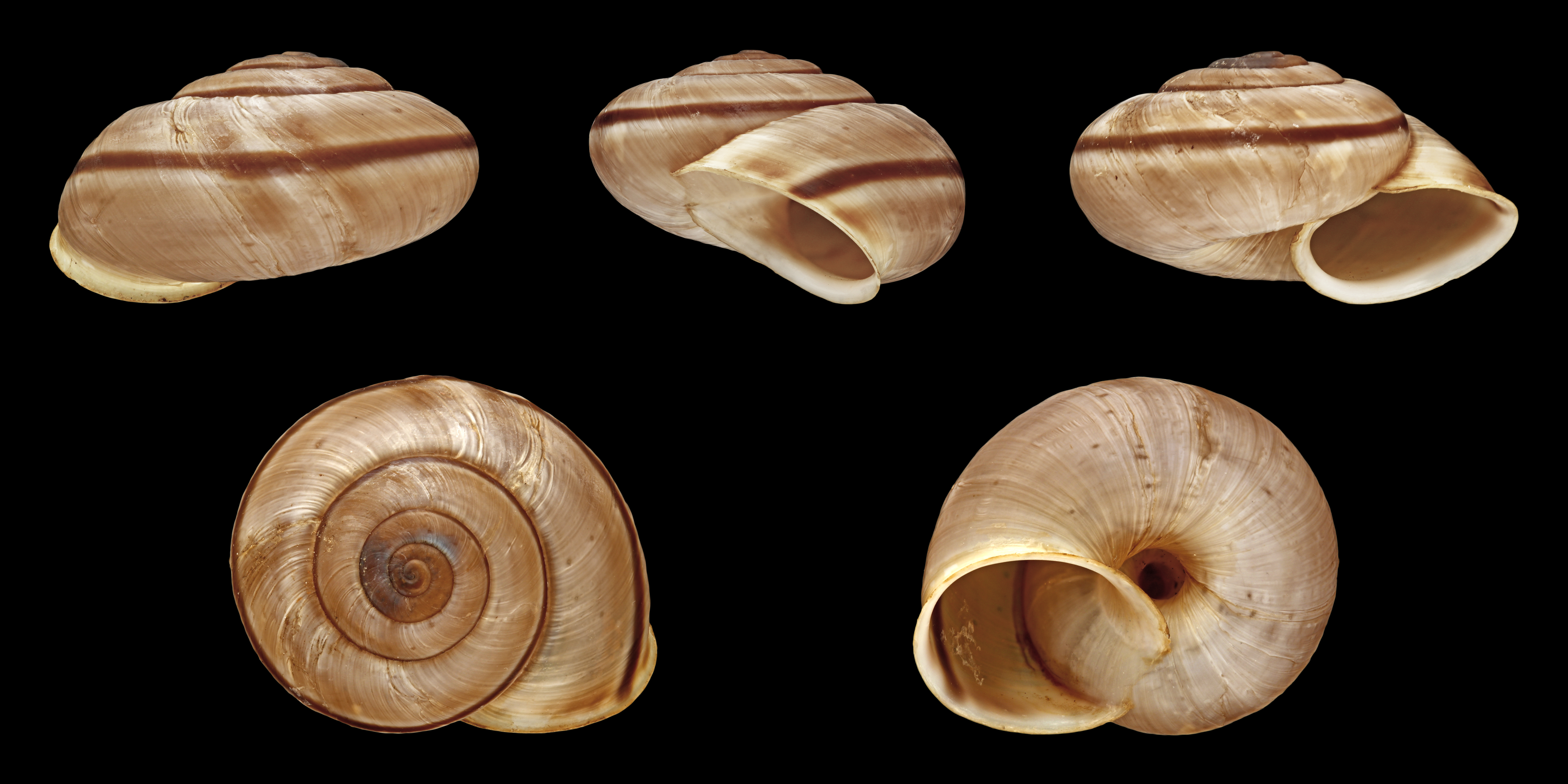
Chilostoma cingulatum baldense

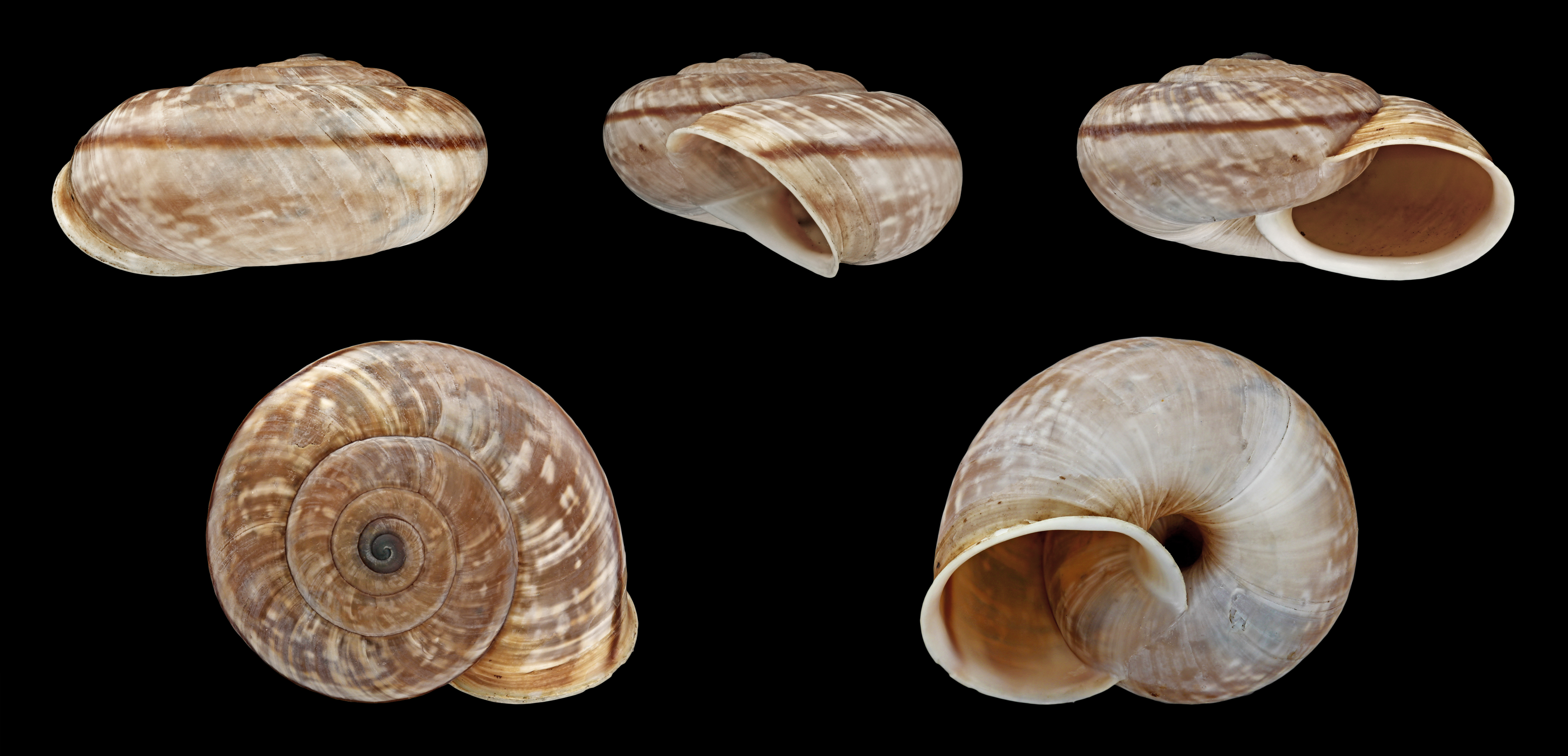
Chilostoma cingulatum colubrinum

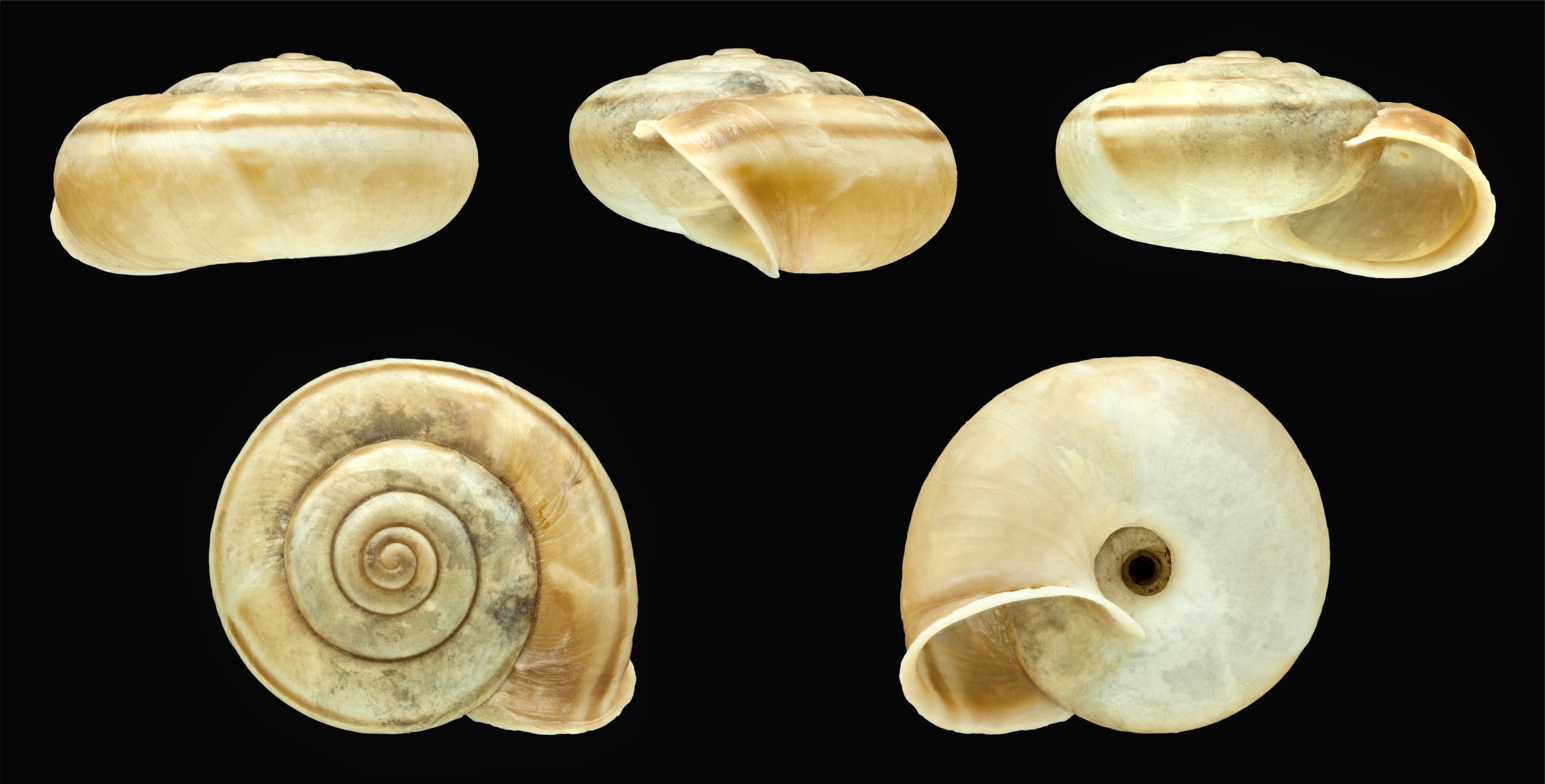
Chilostoma cingulatum nicatis

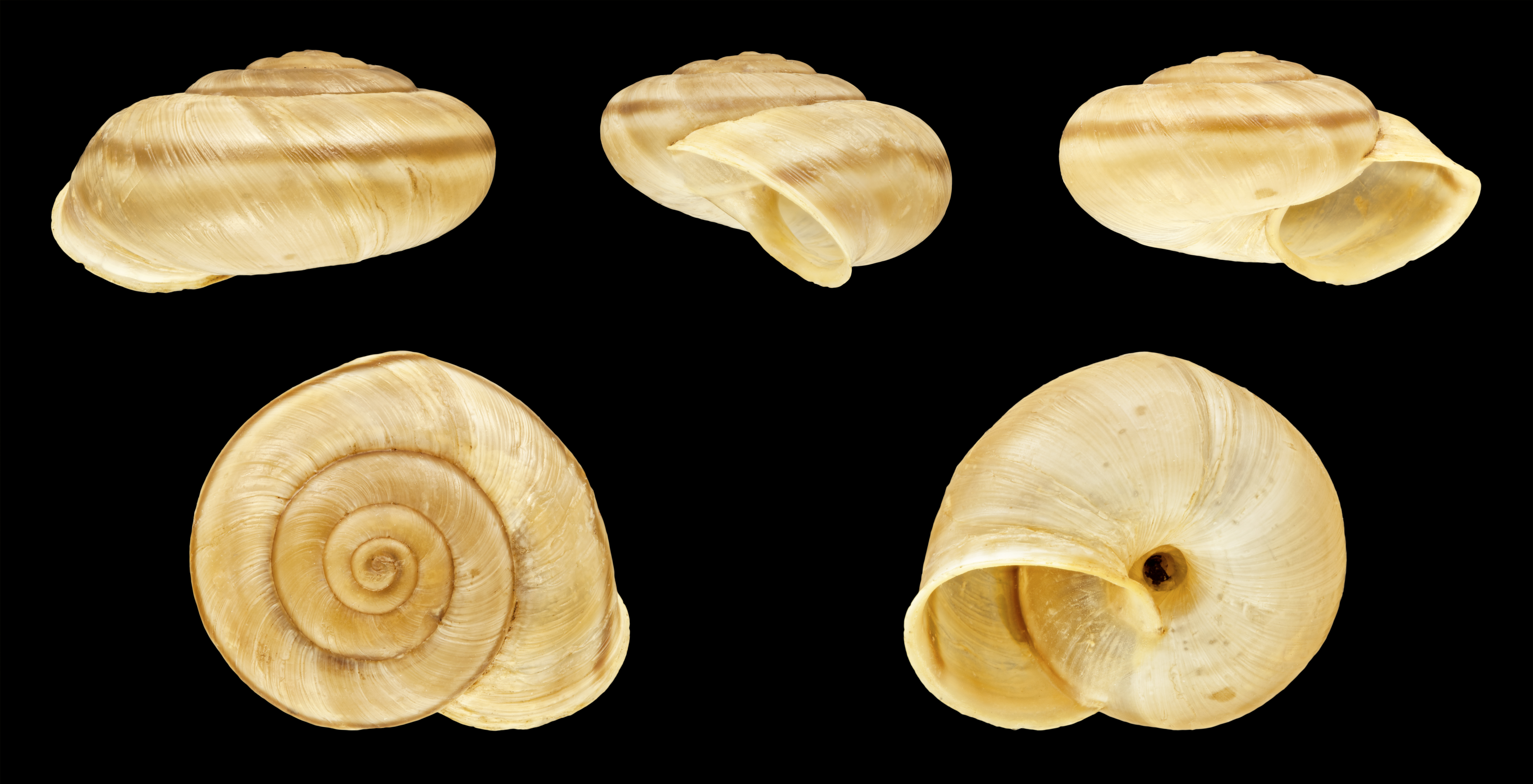
Chilostoma cingulatum preslii

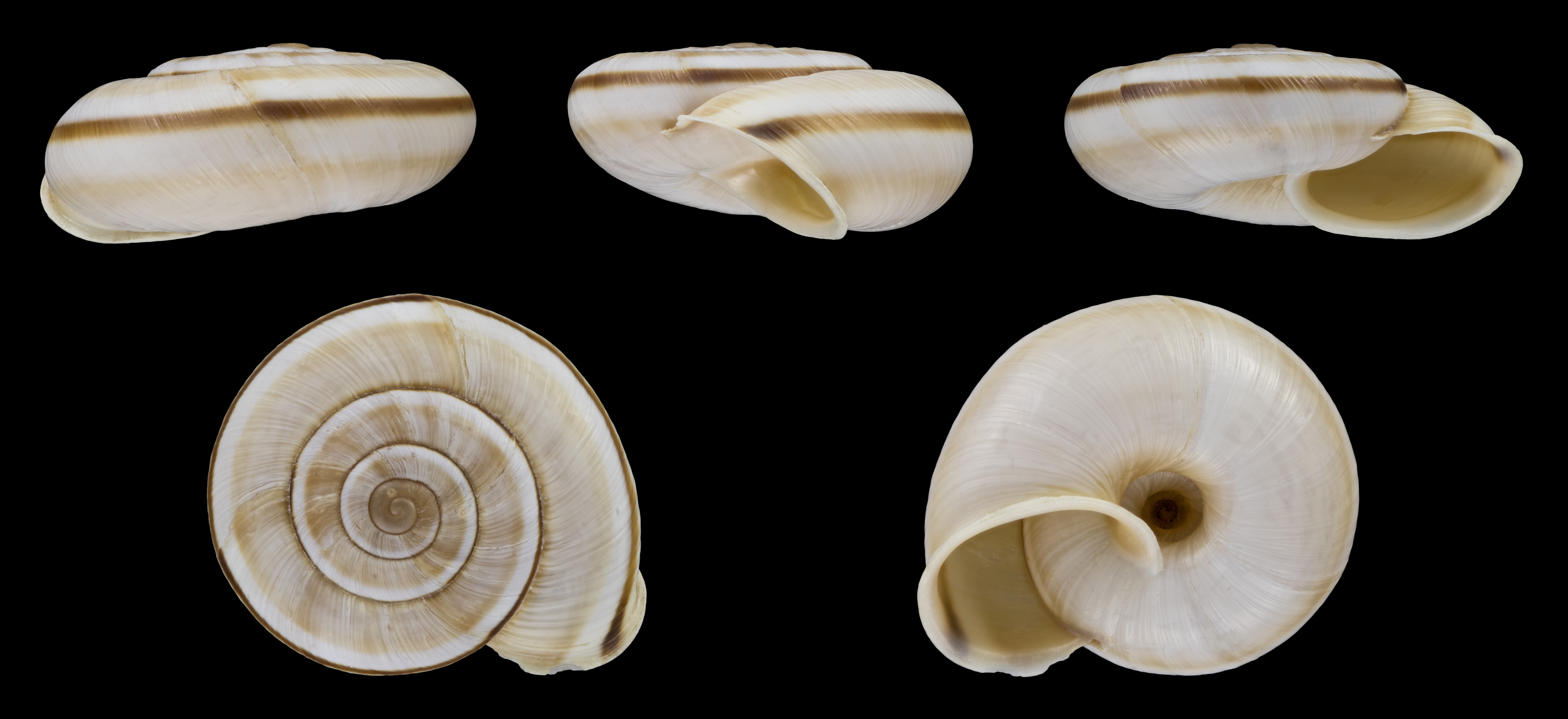
Chilostoma cingulatum preslii
(Flat form)

== Habitat ==
The species is found only on limestone rocks.

== Life cycle ==
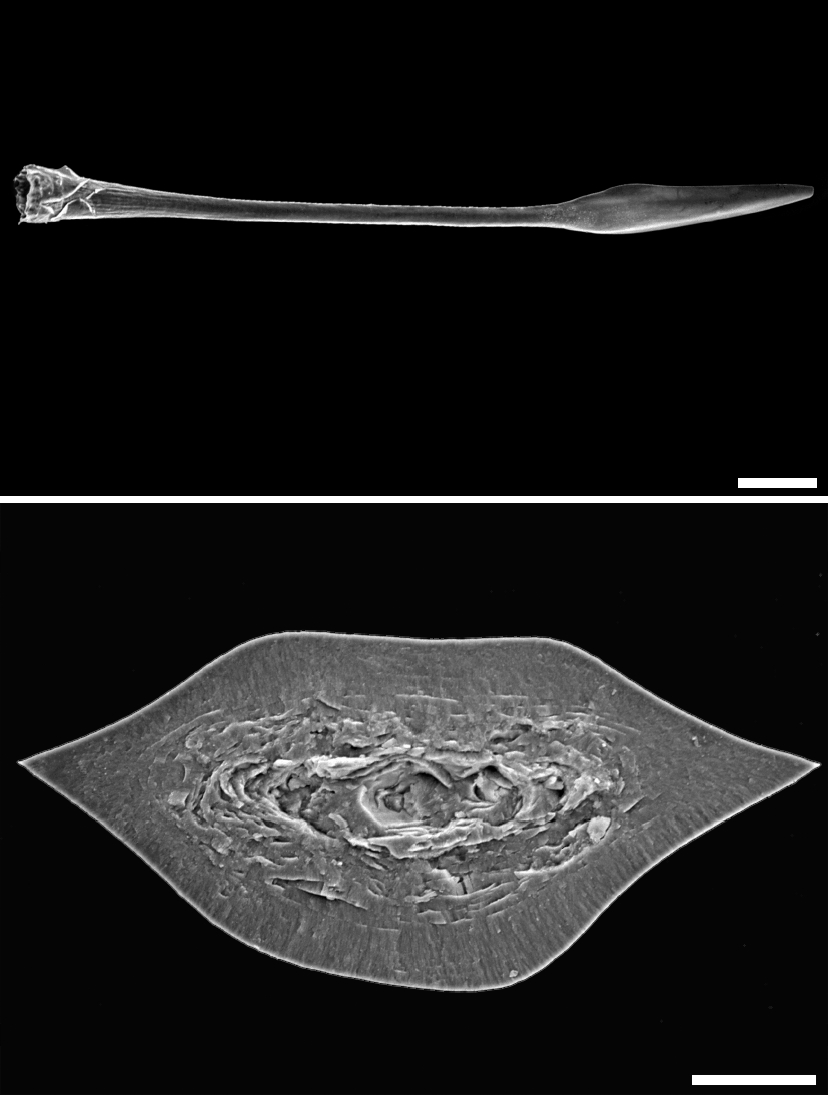
The scanning electron microscope images show (above) the lateral view of the love dart, scale bar 500 μm (0.5 mm); and (below) a cross section of the dart, scale bar 50 μm.

The diameter of the egg of this species is 3.3 mm.

These snails create and use love darts during mating.
