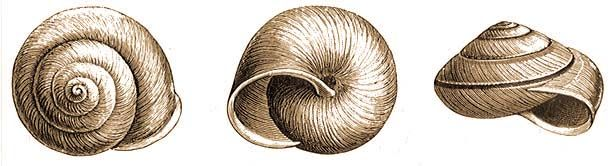
- Drawings of a shell of Drobacia banatica

Conservation status
- Least Concern (IUCN 3.1)

Scientific classification
- Kingdom: Animalia
- Phylum: Mollusca
- Class: Gastropoda
- Order: Stylommatophora
- Family: Helicidae
- Genus: Drobacia
- Species: D. banatica

Binomial name
- Drobacia banatica (Rossmässler, 1838)

= Drobacia banatica =

Species of gastropod

Drobacia banatica is a species of medium-sized air-breathing land snail, a terrestrial pulmonate gastropod mollusk in the family Helicidae, the typical snails.

Synonyms of this species include:

- Chilostoma (Drobacia) banaticum
- Chilostoma banatica
- Helicogona banatica

== Description ==
The width of the shell is approximately 25 mm.

== Distribution ==
This species occurs in Eastern Europe, in Ukraine, Hungary, and in Romania.
