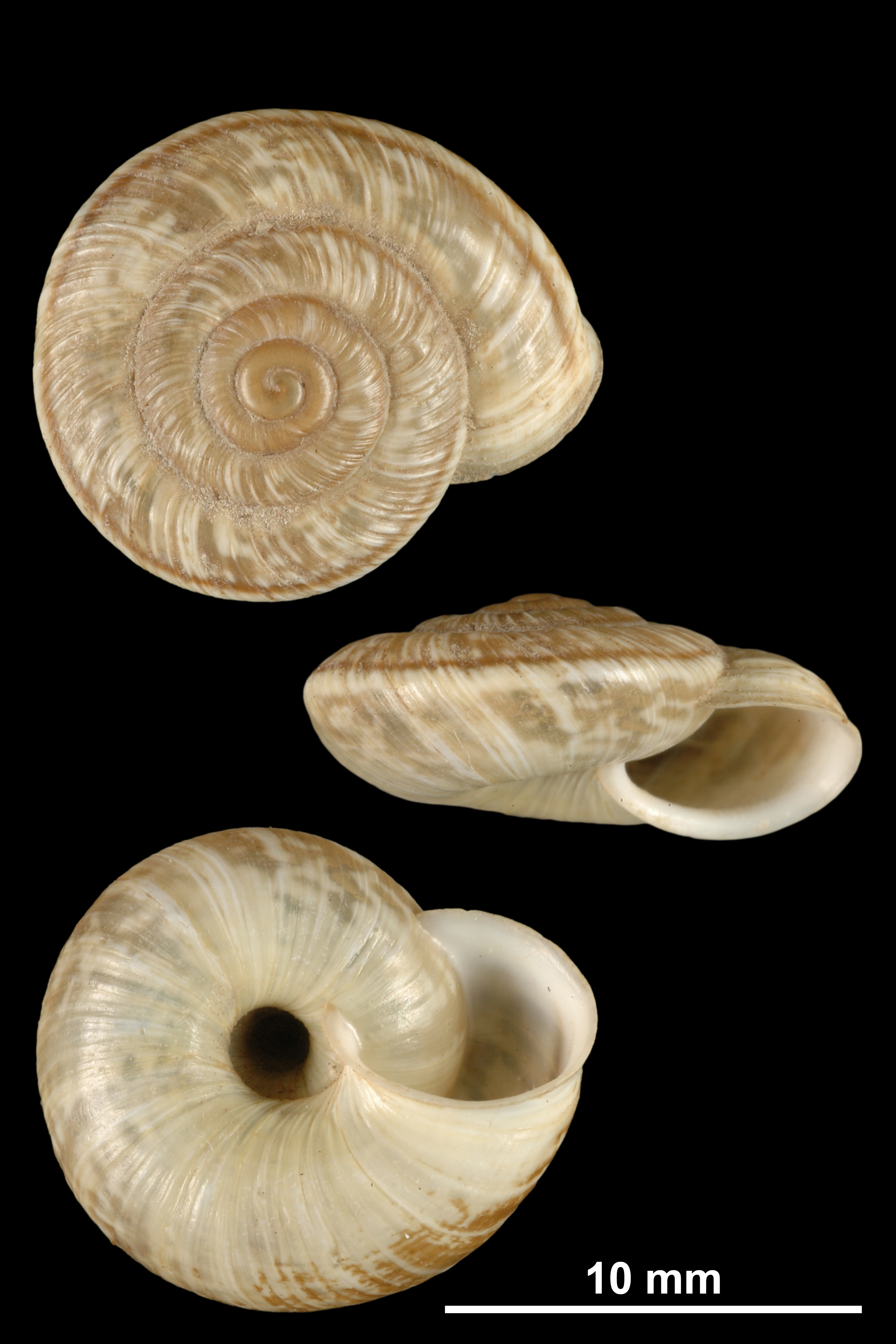
- Delphinatia glacialis shells (specimen at MNHN, Paris)

Scientific classification
- Kingdom: Animalia
- Phylum: Mollusca
- Class: Gastropoda
- Order: Stylommatophora
- Family: Helicidae
- Genus: Delphinatia
- Species: D. glacialis

Binomial name
- Delphinatia glacialis (Férussac, 1832)

Synonyms
- Chilostoma (Delphinatia) glaciale (A. Férussac, 1832)

= Delphinatia glacialis =

Species of gastropod

Delphinatia glacialis is a species of medium-sized, air-breathing, land snail, a terrestrial pulmonate gastropod mollusk in the family Helicidae, the true snails.

== Anatomy ==
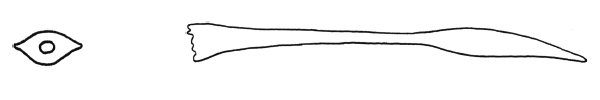
Delphinatia glacialis love dart.

These snails create and use love darts.
