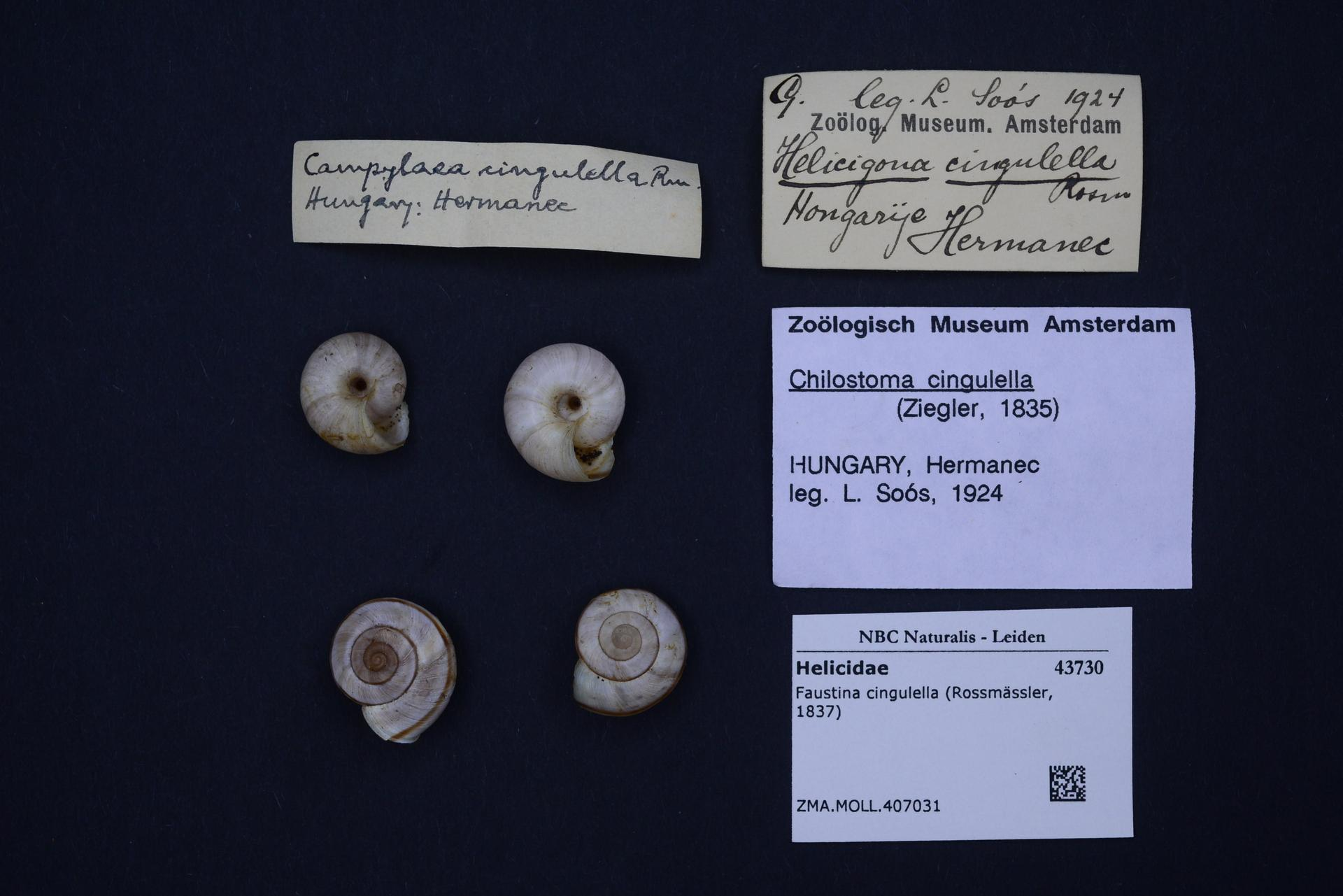
- F. cingulella shells

Conservation status
- Least Concern (IUCN 3.1)

Scientific classification
- Kingdom: Animalia
- Phylum: Mollusca
- Class: Gastropoda
- Order: Stylommatophora
- Family: Helicidae
- Genus: Faustina
- Species: F. cingulella

Binomial name
- Faustina cingulella (Rossmässler, 1837)

Synonyms
- Chilostoma (Faustina) cingulellum (Rossmässler, 1837); Helix cingulella Rossmässler, 1837

= Faustina cingulella =

Species of gastropod

Faustina cingulella is a species of medium-sized, air-breathing land snail, a terrestrial pulmonate gastropod mollusk in the family Helicidae, the true snails. It is native to Poland and Slovakia.

== Distribution and habitat ==
F. cingulella is known at least 50 locations across the northern Carpathian Mountains in Poland and Slovakia at elevations of 600–2,100 m (2,000–6,900 ft) above sea level. It inhabits rocky areas and is mainly associated with limestone, though it may also be found on dolomite.
