= Campylaea =

Scientific classification
- Kingdom: Animalia
- Phylum: Mollusca
- Class: Gastropoda
- Order: Stylommatophora
- Family: Helicidae
- Subfamily: Ariantinae
- Genus: Campylaea; Beck, 1837

Genus of Gastropoda

Campylaea is a genus of gastropods belonging to the family Helicidae. It is found in Southern Europe

== Species ==
As of August 2022, it contains sixteen species:

- Campylaea bozdagensis K.Ali-Zade, 1954
- Campylaea capeki Petrbok, 1922
- Campylaea cyrensis K.Ali-Zade, 1954
- Campylaea doderleiniana (Monterosato, 1869)
- Campylaea hirta (Menke, 1830)
- Campylaea illyrica (Stabile, 1864)
- Campylaea insolida
- Campylaea lefeburiana (A.Férussac, 1821)
- Campylaea ljubetenensis (A.J.Wagner, 1914)
- Campylaea macrostoma (Rossmässler, 1837)
- Campylaea maureliana Bourguignat, 1880
- Campylaea padana (Stabile, 1864)
- Campylaea planospira (Lamarck, 1822)
- Campylaea pouzolzi
- Campylaea ramoriniana Issel, 1867
- Campylaea sadleriana (Rossmässler, 1838)
