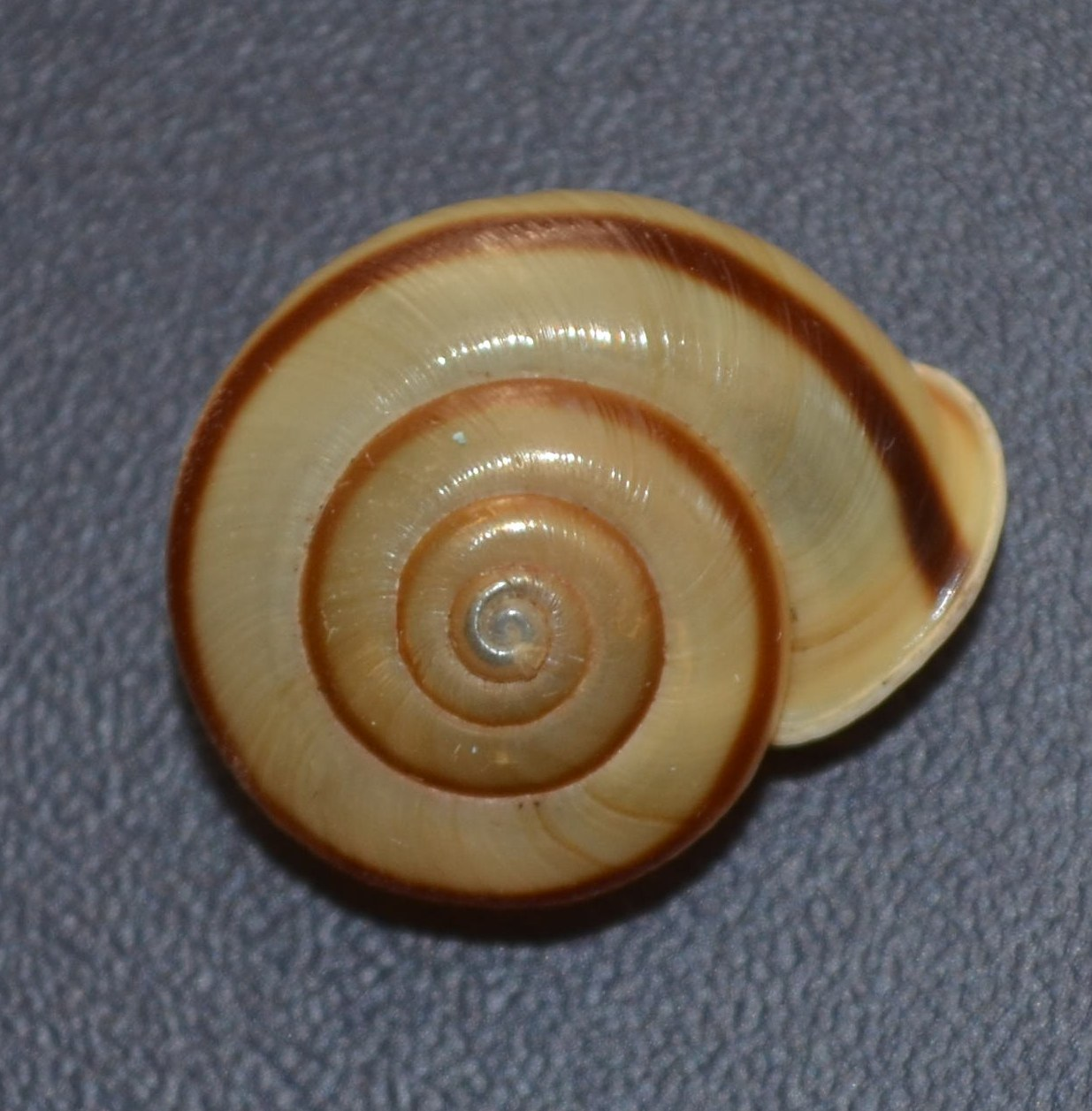
- Faustina faustina shell

Scientific classification
- Kingdom: Animalia
- Phylum: Mollusca
- Class: Gastropoda
- Order: Stylommatophora
- Family: Helicidae
- Genus: Faustina
- Species: F. faustina

Binomial name
- Faustina faustina (Rossmässler, 1835)

Synonyms
- Campylaea faustina (Rossmässler, 1835) superseded combination; Campylaea faustina mut. subflava M. Kimakowicz, 1883 junior subjective synonym; Campylaea faustina var. lituanica Möllendorff, 1898 (suspected synonym); (Faustina) faustinum (Rossmässler, 1835); Helix associata Rossmässler, 1835 (junior synonym); Helix charpentieri Scholtz, 1843 (junior synonym); Helix citrinula L. Pfeiffer, 1859 (junior synonym); Helix faustina Rossmässler, 1835 (original combination); Helix sativa L. Pfeiffer, 1848 (junior synonym); Helix volhyniensis A. Férussac MS (MS name cited in synonymy)

= Faustina faustina =

Species of gastropod

Faustina faustina is a species of medium-sized, air-breathing land snail, a terrestrial pulmonate gastropod mollusk in the family Helicidae, the true snails.

== Distribution ==
This species is known to occur in:

- Ukraine
- Romania
- Hungary
- Slovakia
- Czechia
- Poland
- Lithuania
