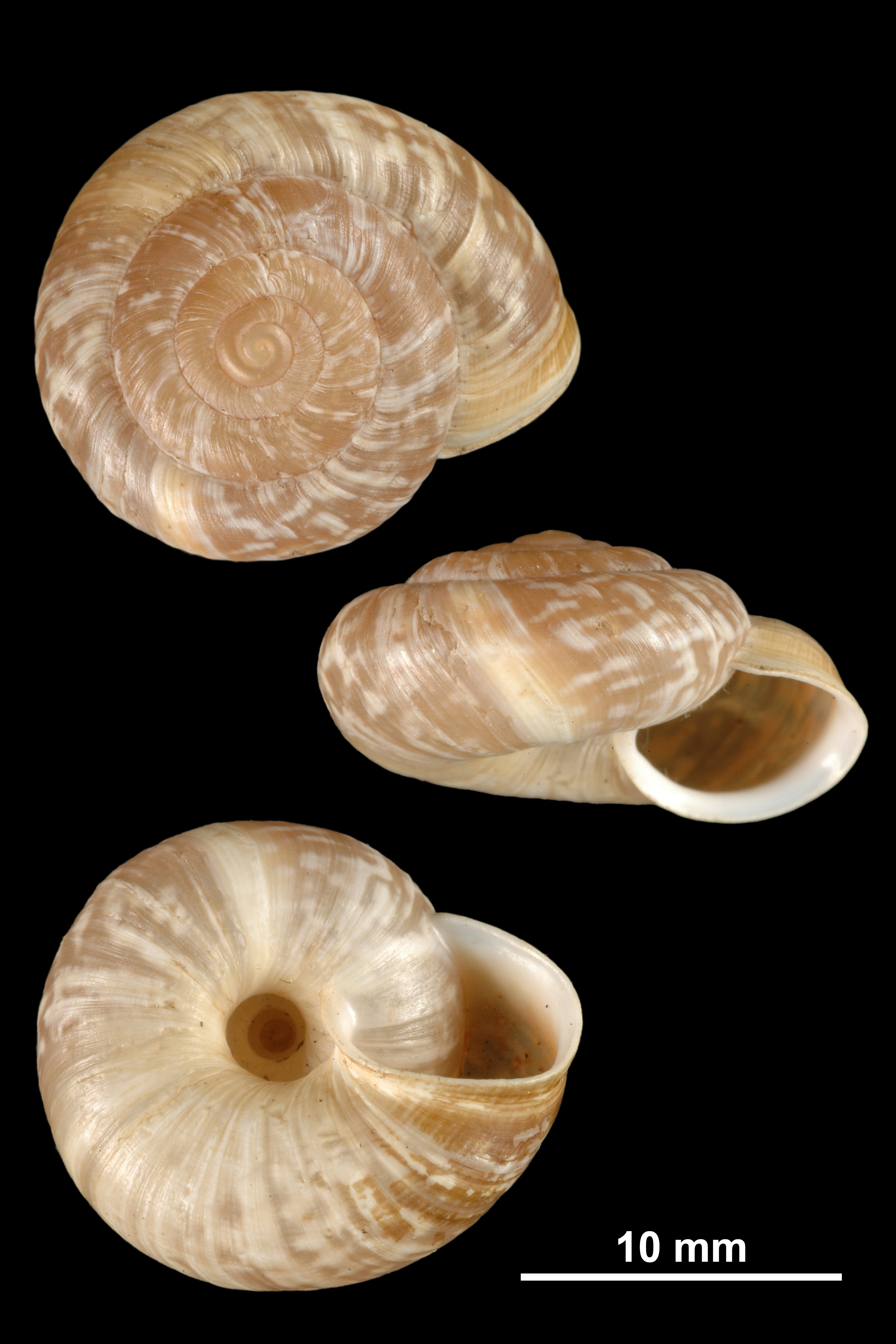
- Shell of Delphinatia fontenillii (specimen at MNHN, Paris)

Scientific classification
- Kingdom: Animalia
- Phylum: Mollusca
- Class: Gastropoda
- Order: Stylommatophora
- Family: Helicidae
- Genus: Delphinatia; P. Hesse, 1931

Type species
- Helix alpina Michaud, 1831

Synonyms
- Chilostoma (Delphinatia) P. Hesse, 1931; Helicigona (Delphinatia) P. Hesse, 1931 superseded rank

= Delphinatia =

Genus of gastropods

Delphinatia is a genus of air-breathing land snails, terrestrial pulmonate gastropod mollusks in the family Helicidae, the typical snails.

== Species ==
- Delphinatia fontenillii (Michaud, 1829)
- Delphinatia glacialis (A. Férussac, 1832)

== Sources ==
- Hesse, P. (1931). Zur Anatomie und Systematik palaearktischer Stylommatophoren. Zoologica, 81 [= 31 (1/2)]: 1–118, pl. 1–16. Stuttgart.
- Groenenberg D.S.J., Subai P. & Gittenberger E. (2016). Systematics of Ariantinae (Gastropoda, Pulmonata, Helicidae), a new approach to an old problem. Contributions to Zoology. 85(1): 37–65.
