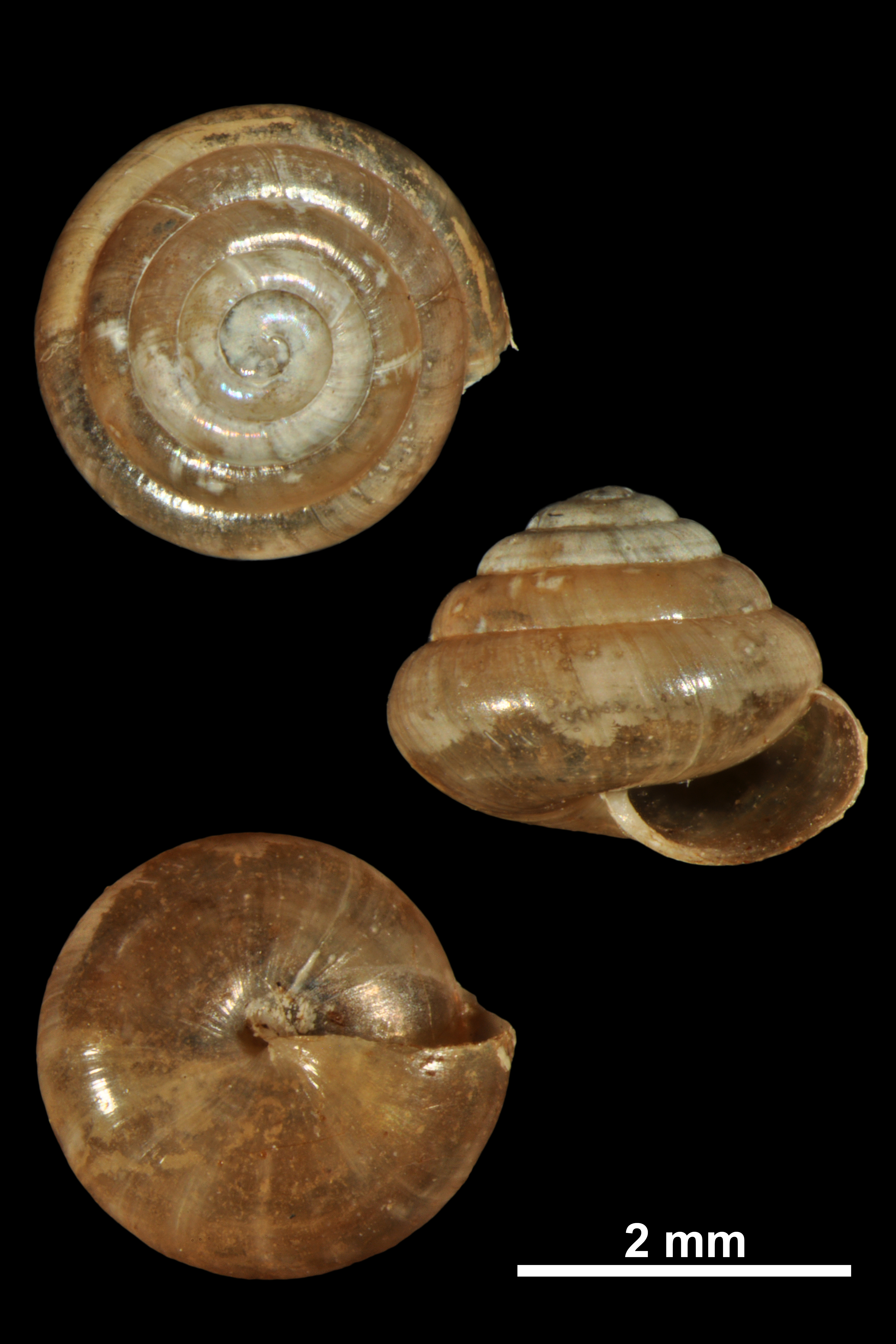
- Euconulus praticola

Scientific classification
- Kingdom: Animalia
- Phylum: Mollusca
- Class: Gastropoda
- Order: Stylommatophora
- Family: Euconulidae
- Genus: Euconulus
- Species: E. praticola

Binomial name
- Euconulus praticola (Reinhardt, 1883)

= Euconulus praticola =

Species of gastropod

Euconulus praticola is a species of small air-breathing land snail, a terrestrial pulmonate gastropod mollusk in the family Euconulidae, the hive snails.

== Distribution ==
This species occurs in the Czech Republic
