= Melloconcha miranda =

Scientific classification
- Kingdom: Animalia
- Phylum: Mollusca
- Class: Gastropoda
- Order: Stylommatophora
- Family: Euconulidae
- Subfamily: Microcystinae
- Tribe: Liardetiini
- Genus: Melloconcha
- Species: M. miranda

Binomial name
- Melloconcha miranda (Iredale, 1944)
- Location of Lord Howe Island

Synonyms
- Annacharis miranda Iredale, 1944

Species of land snail

Melloconcha miranda, also known as the Miranda's glass-snail, is a species of land snail that is endemic to Australia's Lord Howe Island in the Tasman Sea.

== Taxonomy ==
The species is sometimes placed in the monotypic genus Annacharis because of its distinctive channelled sutures.

== Description ==
The discoidal shell of the mature snail is 3.7 mm in height, with a diameter of 6.7 mm, and a low spire. It is smooth, glossy and pale golden in colour The whorls are rounded, with deeply channelled sutures and finely incised spiral grooves. It has an ovately lunate aperture and closed umbilicus. The animal is unknown.

== Distribution and habitat ==
The snail is only known from a single empty shell collected from the summit of Mount Gower in 1913. It is evidently very rare and may be extinct.
