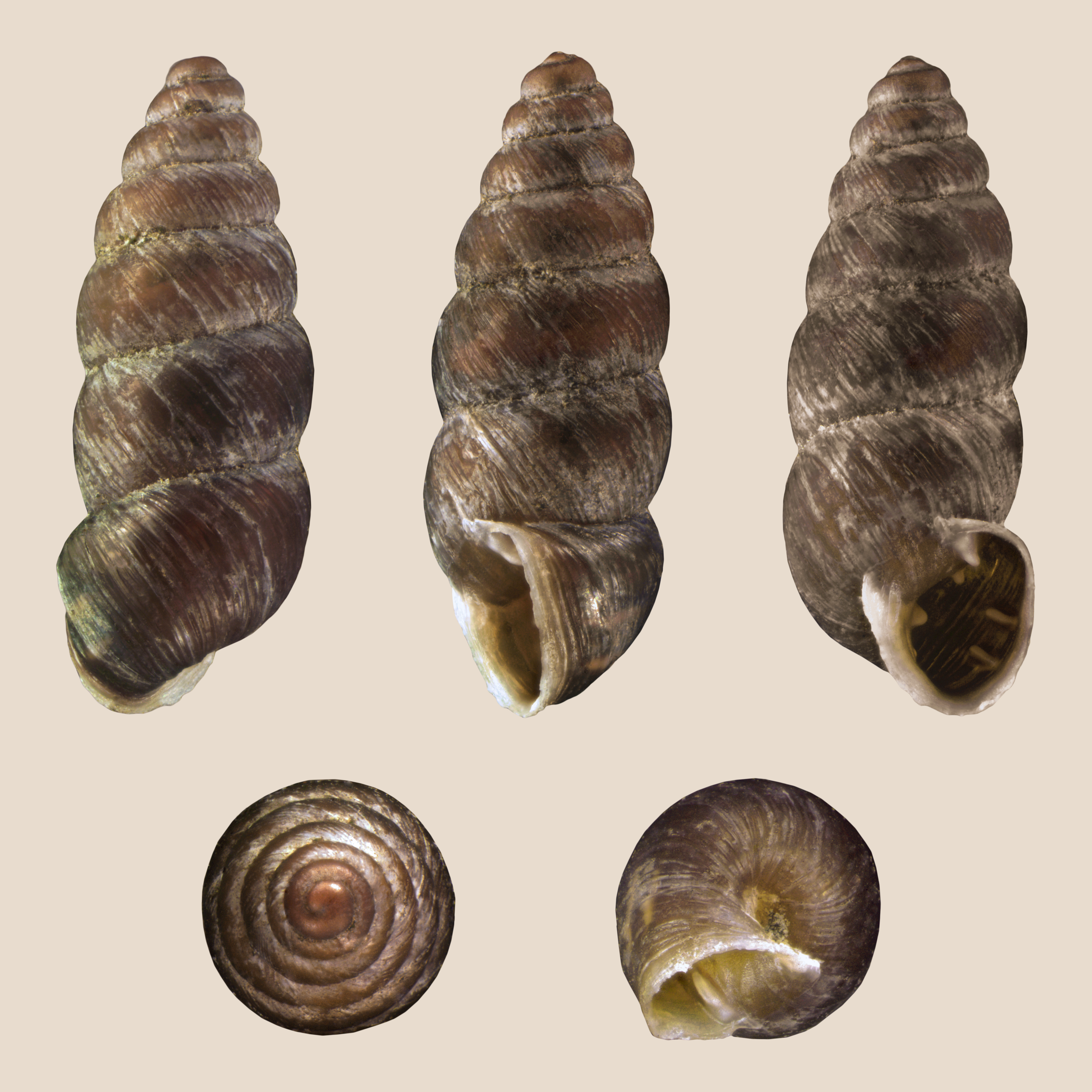

Scientific classification
- Kingdom: Animalia
- Phylum: Mollusca
- Class: Gastropoda
- Order: Stylommatophora
- Family: Chondrinidae
- Genus: Chondrina
- Species: C. arcadica

Binomial name
- Chondrina arcadica (Reinhardt, 1881)

Synonyms
- Torquilla avenacea var. arcadica Reinhardt, 1881

= Chondrina arcadica =

Species of gastropod

Chondrina arcadica is a species of small air-breathing land snail, a terrestrial pulmonate gastropod mollusk belonging to the family Chondrinidae. This species is also known under the synonym Chondrina arcadica clienta (Westerlund 1883).

The species is found South Europe and Sweden.

Subspecies:

- Chondrina arcadica abundans (Westerlund, 1894)
- Chondrina arcadica arcadica (Reinhardt, 1881) or Chondrina arcadica clienta (Westerlund, 1883)
- Chondrina arcadica bulgarica H. Nordsieck, 1970
- Chondrina arcadica caucasica Ehrmann, 1931

== Shell description ==
The shell of this species is slender, greyish brown to reddish brown. It is conical-ovoid in shape with 7 to 7 1/2 whorls. The shell is slightly translucent and shows regular axial lines. There is some microgeographical variation in its shell size. The apertural margin is slightly widened, and has a thin, whitish lip. There are strong, angular teeth along the aperture.

== Distribution ==
The distribution of this species is Alpine and southeastern-European. but this snail can occur as far north as on the Baltic island of Öland, southern Sweden. The snails can be found on exposed limestone rocks to a height of about 2,500 m.

This species occurs in:

- Czech Republic - vulnerable (VU)
- Slovakia
- Ukraine

== Feeding habits ==
Chondrina clienta feeds on calcicolous lichens.
