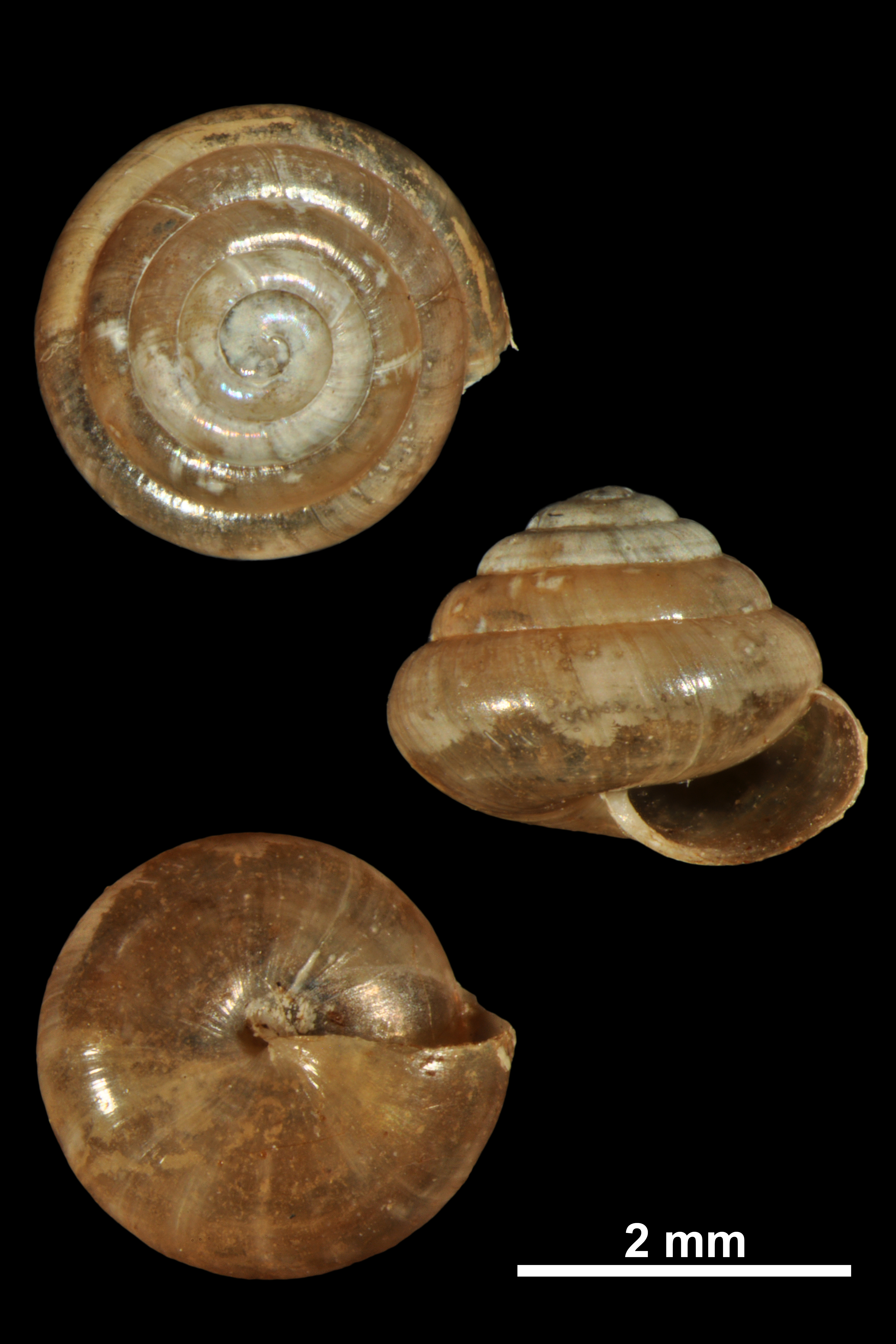
- Shell of Euconulus alderi (specimen at MNHN, Paris)

Conservation status
- Secure (NatureServe)

Scientific classification
- Kingdom: Animalia
- Phylum: Mollusca
- Class: Gastropoda
- Order: Stylommatophora
- Family: Euconulidae
- Genus: Euconulus
- Species: E. alderi

Binomial name
- Euconulus alderi Davies, 1979

Synonyms
- Euconulus (Euconulus) alderi (Gray, 1840); Euconulus (Euconulus) praticola (Reinhardt, 1883)· accepted, alternate representation; Euconulus praticola (Reinhardt, 1883) (junior synonym); Helix fulva var. alderi Gray, 1840; Hyalina (Conulus) praticola Reinhardt, 1883

= Euconulus alderi =

Species of gastropod

Euconulus alderi is a species of small air-breathing land snail, a terrestrial pulmonate gastropod mollusk in the family Euconulidae, the hive snails.

== Distribution ==
This species occurs in countries and islands including:

- Great Britain
- Ireland
- France
- Sweden
- the USA
