= Nancibella quintalia =

Conservation status
- Extinct (IUCN 2.3)

Scientific classification
- Kingdom: Animalia
- Phylum: Mollusca
- Class: Gastropoda
- Order: Stylommatophora
- Family: Euconulidae
- Genus: Nancibella
- Species: †N. quintalia

Binomial name
- †Nancibella quintalia Cox, 1870

Species of gastropod

Nancibella quintalia is a species of air-breathing land snail or semislug, a terrestrial pulmonate gastropod mollusks in the family Helicarionidae.

This species is endemic to Norfolk Island. It was thought to be extinct as of the mid-1990s, and the latest IUCN assessment, which is outdated, still lists it as Extinct. However, in 2020, a living specimen of the snail was discovered in the wild, leading scientists to believe a small population still exists.
