= Iredaleoconcha caporaphe =

Conservation status
- Vulnerable (IUCN 2.3)

Scientific classification
- Kingdom: Animalia
- Phylum: Mollusca
- Class: Gastropoda
- Order: Stylommatophora
- Family: Euconulidae
- Genus: Iredaleoconcha
- Species: I. caporaphe

Binomial name
- Iredaleoconcha caporaphe Preston, 1913

Species of gastropod

Iredaleoconcha caporaphe is a species of air-breathing land snail or semi-slug, a terrestrial pulmonate gastropod mollusc in the family Euconulidae. This species is endemic to Norfolk Island.
