= Melloconcha flavescens =

Scientific classification
- Kingdom: Animalia
- Phylum: Mollusca
- Class: Gastropoda
- Order: Stylommatophora
- Family: Euconulidae
- Subfamily: Microcystinae
- Tribe: Liardetiini
- Genus: Melloconcha
- Species: M. flavescens

Binomial name
- Melloconcha flavescens (Iredale, 1944)
- Location of Lord Howe Island

Synonyms
- Tribocystis flavescens Iredale, 1944

Species of land snail

Melloconcha flavescens, also known as the tiny yellow glass-snail, is a species of land snail that is endemic to Australia's Lord Howe Island in the Tasman Sea.

== Description ==
The discoidal shell of the mature snail is 2.7–3.6 mm in height, with a diameter of 5–6.5 mm, and a low spire. It is smooth, glossy and golden-brown in colour The whorls are flattened above and rounded below, with a slightly angulate periphery and finely incised spiral grooves. It has an ovately lunate aperture and closed umbilicus. The animal is cream, with dark grey neck, head and eyestalks, often with red, orange or yellow colouration at the end of the tail.

== Distribution and habitat ==
The snail is widespread across the island in rainforest and moist woodland, in litter and in the axils between the stems and trunks of palms.
