= Liardetia boninensis =

Conservation status
- Vulnerable (IUCN 2.3)

Scientific classification
- Kingdom: Animalia
- Phylum: Mollusca
- Class: Gastropoda
- Order: Stylommatophora
- Family: Euconulidae
- Genus: Liardetia
- Species: L. boninensis

Binomial name
- Liardetia boninensis (Pilsbry & Hirase, 1909)

Species of gastropod

Liardetia boninensis is a species of small air-breathing land snails, terrestrial pulmonate gastropod mollusks in the family Euconulidae, the hive snails. This species is endemic to Japan.
