= Melloconcha delecta =

Scientific classification
- Kingdom: Animalia
- Phylum: Mollusca
- Class: Gastropoda
- Order: Stylommatophora
- Family: Euconulidae
- Subfamily: Microcystinae
- Tribe: Liardetiini
- Genus: Melloconcha
- Species: M. delecta

Binomial name
- Melloconcha delecta Iredale, 1944
- Location of Lord Howe Island

Species of land snail

Melloconcha delecta, also known as the tiny amber glass-snail, is a species of land snail that is endemic to Australia's Lord Howe Island in the Tasman Sea.

== Description ==
The domed shell of the mature snail is 3.7–4.5 mm in height, with a diameter of 5.3–5.9 mm. It is smooth, glossy and transparent amber in colour The whorls are rounded, with slightly impressed sutures and finely incised spiral grooves. It has an ovately lunate aperture and closed umbilicus. The animal is grey to black.

== Distribution and habitat ==
The snail is widespread across the island, including the summits and upper slopes of the southern mountains.
