= Liardetia tenuisculpta =

Conservation status
- Data Deficient (IUCN 2.3)

Scientific classification
- Kingdom: Animalia
- Phylum: Mollusca
- Class: Gastropoda
- Order: Stylommatophora
- Family: Euconulidae
- Genus: Liardetia
- Species: L. tenuisculpta

Binomial name
- Liardetia tenuisculpta (Möllendorff, 1893)

Species of gastropod

Liardetia tenuisculpta is a species of small air-breathing land snails, terrestrial pulmonate gastropod mollusks in the family Euconulidae, the hive snails. This species is endemic to Micronesia.
