= Palaua margaritacea =

Conservation status
- Data Deficient (IUCN 2.3)

Scientific classification
- Kingdom: Animalia
- Phylum: Mollusca
- Class: Gastropoda
- Order: Stylommatophora
- Family: Euconulidae
- Genus: Palaua
- Species: P. margaritacea

Binomial name
- Palaua margaritacea (C. Semper, 1870)

Species of gastropod

Palaua margaritacea is a species of very small air-breathing land snail, a terrestrial pulmonate gastropod mollusk in the family Euconulidae, the hive snails. This species is endemic to Palau.
