= Melloconcha prensa =

Scientific classification
- Kingdom: Animalia
- Phylum: Mollusca
- Class: Gastropoda
- Order: Stylommatophora
- Family: Euconulidae
- Subfamily: Microcystinae
- Tribe: Liardetiini
- Genus: Melloconcha
- Species: M. prensa

Binomial name
- Melloconcha prensa Iredale, 1944
- Location of Lord Howe Island

Species of land snail

Melloconcha prensa, also known as the flattened glass-snail, is a species of land snail that is endemic to Australia's Lord Howe Island in the Tasman Sea.

== Description ==
The discoidal shell of the mature snail is 3.7–4.5 mm in height, with a diameter of 6.8–8 mm, and a low spire. It is smooth, glossy and pale golden-brown in colour The whorls are rounded, with finely incised spiral grooves. It has an ovately lunate aperture and closed umbilicus.

== Distribution and habitat ==
This uncommon snail occurs on the slopes and summits of the southern mountains, where it inhabits rainforest and moist woodland, in litter and in the axils between the stems and trunks of palms.
