= Melloconcha rosacea =

Scientific classification
- Kingdom: Animalia
- Phylum: Mollusca
- Class: Gastropoda
- Order: Stylommatophora
- Family: Euconulidae
- Subfamily: Microcystinae
- Tribe: Liardetiini
- Genus: Melloconcha
- Species: M. rosacea

Binomial name
- Melloconcha rosacea (Iredale, 1944)
- Location of Lord Howe Island

Synonyms
- Tribocystis rosacea Iredale, 1944

Species of land snail

Melloconcha rosacea, also known as the tiny rosy glass-snail, is a species of land snail that is endemic to Australia's Lord Howe Island in the Tasman Sea.

== Description ==
The discoidal shell of the mature snail is 1.8–2.1 mm in height, with a diameter of 3.7–4.1 mm, and a flat or slightly raised spire. It is smooth, glossy and dark amber-brown in colour in live animals, the empty shell being golden-brown. The whorls are rounded, with flat sutures and finely incised spiral grooves. It has an ovately lunate aperture and closed umbilicus. The animal is dark grey with darker eyestalks.

== Distribution and habitat ==
The snail has a patchy distribution across the island and is found in leaf litter and the axils of palms.
