= Kusaiea frivola =

Conservation status
- Data Deficient (IUCN 2.3)

Scientific classification
- Kingdom: Animalia
- Phylum: Mollusca
- Class: Gastropoda
- Order: Stylommatophora
- Family: Euconulidae
- Genus: Kusaiea
- Species: K. frivola

Binomial name
- Kusaiea frivola (Pease, 1866)

Species of gastropod

Kusaiea frivola is a species of small air-breathing land snails, terrestrial pulmonate gastropod mollusks in the family Euconulidae, the hive snails. This species is endemic to Micronesia.
