= Melloconcha grata =

Scientific classification
- Kingdom: Animalia
- Phylum: Mollusca
- Class: Gastropoda
- Order: Stylommatophora
- Family: Euconulidae
- Subfamily: Microcystinae
- Tribe: Liardetiini
- Genus: Melloconcha
- Species: M. grata

Binomial name
- Melloconcha grata Iredale, 1944
- Location of Lord Howe Island

Species of land snail

Melloconcha grata, also known as the angulate glass-snail, is a species of land snail that is endemic to Australia's Lord Howe Island in the Tasman Sea.

== Description ==
The trochoidal shell of the mature snail is 4.5 mm in height, with a diameter of 6.6 mm, and an elevated spire. It is smooth, glossy and golden-brown in colour The whorls are flattened above and rounded below with an angulate periphery, weakly impressed sutures and finely incised spiral grooves. It has an ovately lunate aperture and closed umbilicus.

== Distribution and habitat ==
The snail is known only from the summit, and possibly upper slopes, of Mount Gower. It is rare and may be extinct.
