= Palaua minor =

Conservation status
- Least Concern (IUCN 3.1)

Scientific classification
- Kingdom: Animalia
- Phylum: Mollusca
- Class: Gastropoda
- Order: Stylommatophora
- Family: Euconulidae
- Genus: Palaua
- Species: P. minor

Binomial name
- Palaua minor (C. Semper, 1870)

Species of gastropod

Palaua minor is a species of very small air-breathing land snail, a terrestrial pulmonate gastropod mollusk in the family Euconulidae, the hive snails. This species is endemic to Palau.
