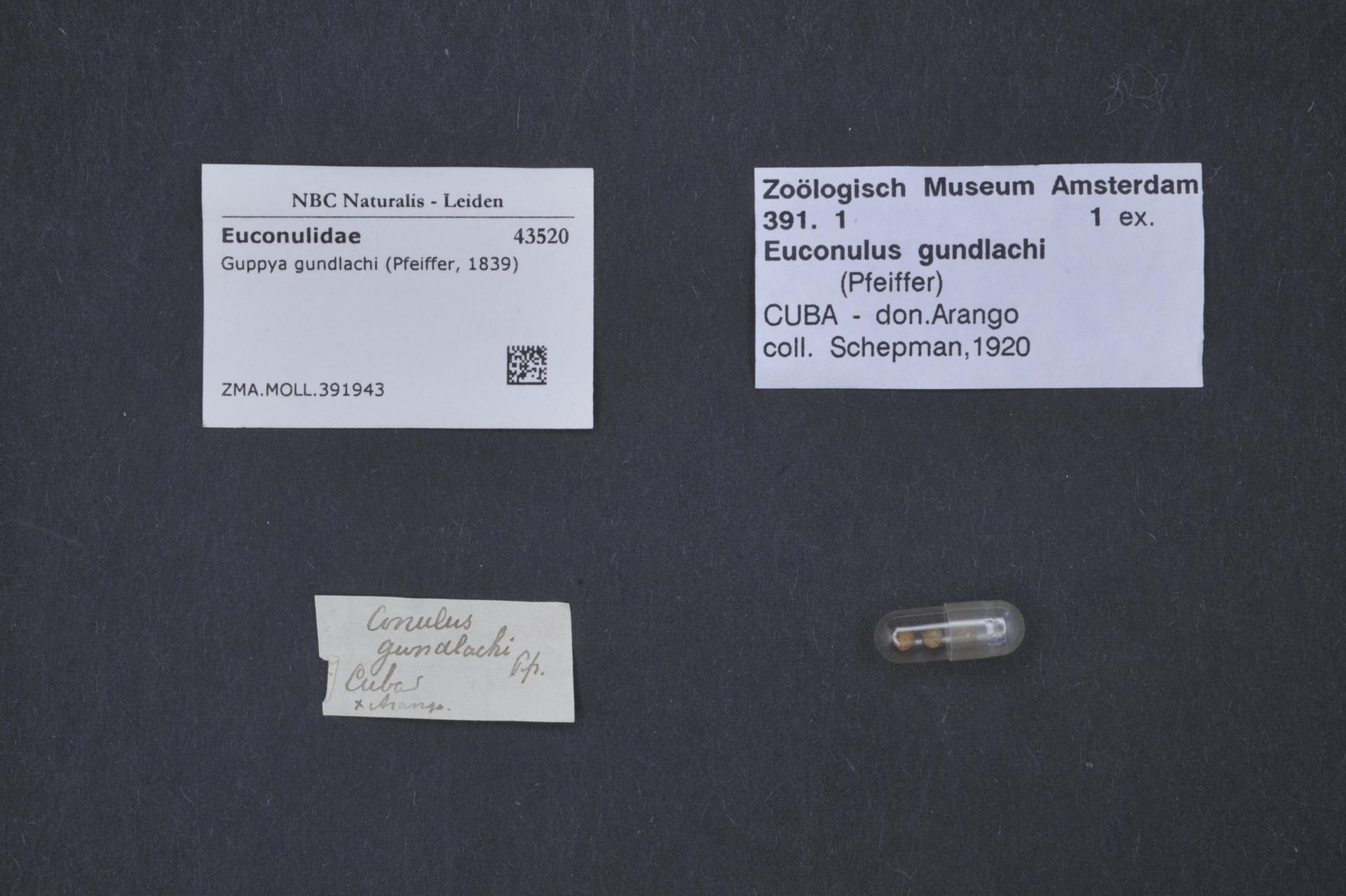

Conservation status
- Vulnerable (NatureServe)

Scientific classification
- Kingdom: Animalia
- Phylum: Mollusca
- Class: Gastropoda
- Order: Stylommatophora
- Family: Euconulidae
- Genus: Guppya
- Species: G. gundlachi

Binomial name
- Guppya gundlachi (Pfeiffer, 1840)

= Guppya gundlachi =

Species of gastropod

Guppya gundlachi is a species of gastropod belonging to the family Euconulidae. Its specific epithet honors Juan Gundlach, a Cuban naturalist.

The species is found in Mexico, Central America, the Caribbean, Florida, and northern South America.
