= Kusaiea =

Scientific classification
- Kingdom: Animalia
- Phylum: Mollusca
- Class: Gastropoda
- Order: Stylommatophora
- Family: Euconulidae
- Genus: Kusaiea; Baker, 1938

Genus of gastropods

Kusaiea is a genus of small air-breathing land snails, terrestrial pulmonate gastropod mollusks in the family Euconulidae, the hive snails.

== Species ==
Species within the genus Kusaiea include:

- Kusaiea frivola
