= Afropunctum =

Scientific classification
- Kingdom: Animalia
- Phylum: Mollusca
- Class: Gastropoda
- Order: Stylommatophora
- Family: Euconulidae
- Genus: Afropunctum; Haas, 1934

Genus of land snails

Afropunctum is a genus of gastropods belonging to the family Euconulidae.

The species of this genus are found in Northern Europe and Africa.

Species:

- Afropunctum quadrisculptum Connolly, 1939
- Afropunctum seminium (Morelet, 1873)
