= Guppya =

Scientific classification
- Kingdom: Animalia
- Phylum: Mollusca
- Class: Gastropoda
- Order: Stylommatophora
- Family: Euconulidae
- Genus: Guppya; Mörch, 1867

Genus of land snails

Guppya is a genus of gastropods belonging to the family Euconulidae.

The species of this genus are found in America, Africa, Malesia.

Species:

- Guppya angasi E.von Martens, 1892
- Guppya bauri (Dall, 1892)
- Guppya biolleyi E.von Martens, 1892
- Guppya capsula Dall, 1926
- Guppya coneyi
- Guppya fulvoidea (Morelet, 1851)
- Guppya gundlachi (L.Pfeiffer, 1840)
- Guppya hallucinata E.A.Smith, 1898
- Guppya jalisco Pilsbry, 1920
- Guppya livida (Guilding, 1828)
- Guppya miamiensis Pilsbry, 1903
- Guppya micans (Angas, 1879)
- Guppya micra Pilsbry, 1904
- Guppya molengraaffi H.B.Baker, 1924
- Guppya montanicola Dall, 1926
- Guppya perforata Dall, 1926
- Guppya semisculpta Thiele, 1928
- Guppya sericea Ancey, 1901
- Guppya socorroana Dall, 1926
- Guppya spirulata (L.Pfeiffer, 1846)
- Guppya sterkii (Dall, 1888)
