= Afroconulus =

Scientific classification
- Kingdom: Animalia
- Phylum: Mollusca
- Class: Gastropoda
- Order: Stylommatophora
- Family: Euconulidae
- Genus: Afroconulus; Van Mol & van Bruggen, 1971

Genus of land snails

Afroconulus is a genus of gastropods belonging to the family Euconulidae. The species of this genus are found in Africa.

== Species ==
- Afroconulus concavispira (F.Haas, 1936)
- Afroconulus diaphanus (Connolly, 1922)
- Afroconulus iredalei (Preston, 1912)
- Afroconulus roseus (D.T.Holyoak & G.A.Holyoak, 2020)
- Afroconulus urguessensis (Connolly, 1925)
