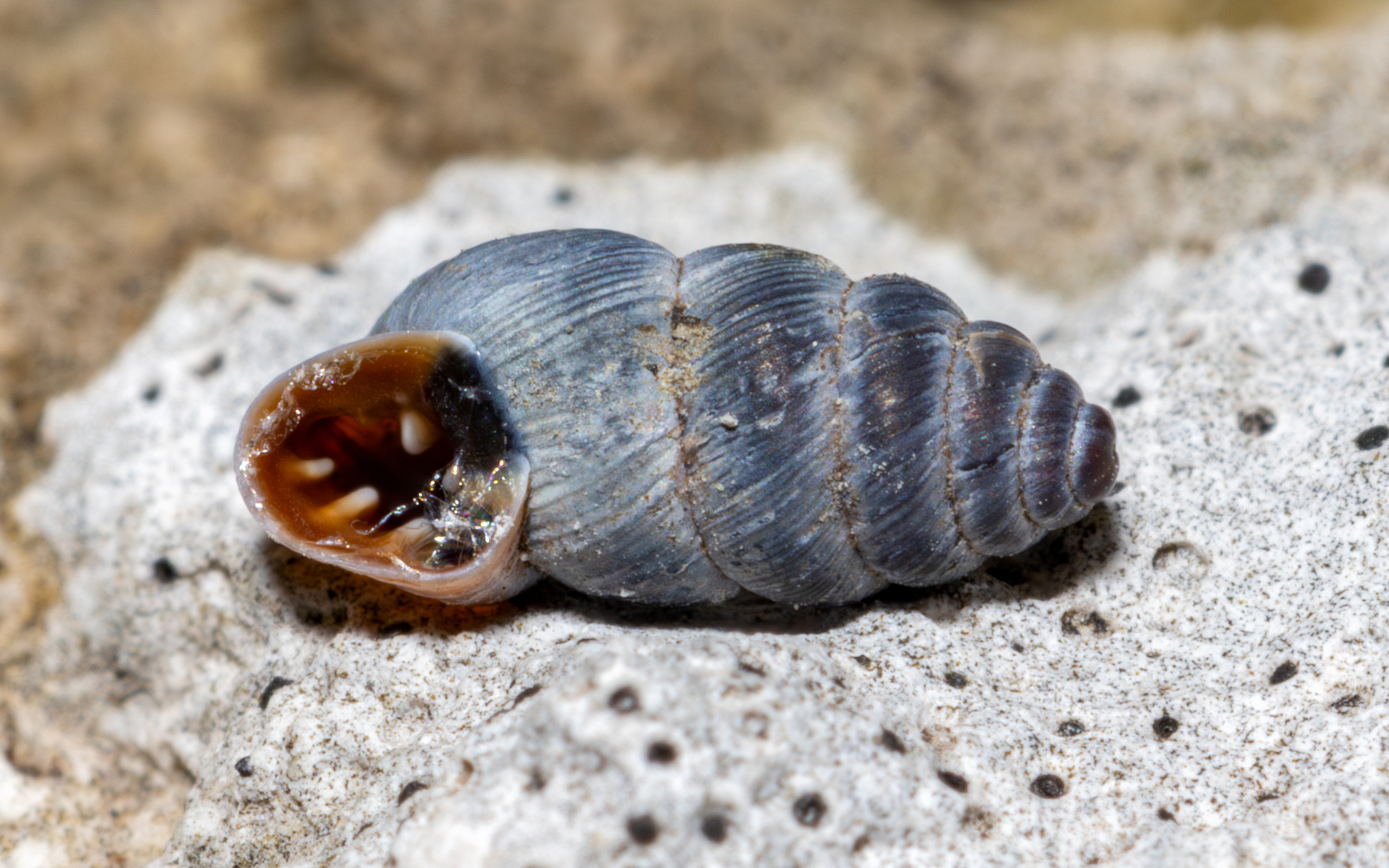
- Occupied Chondrina kobelti shell, Spain

Scientific classification
- Kingdom: Animalia
- Phylum: Mollusca
- Class: Gastropoda
- Order: Stylommatophora
- Family: Chondrinidae
- Genus: Chondrina; Reichenbach, 1828

Synonyms
- Alloglossa Lindström, 1868; Chondrina (Chondrina) Reichenbach, 1828 (no subgenera are recognized); Modicella H. Adams & A. Adams, 1855; Pupa (Modicella) H. Adams & A. Adams, 1855

= Chondrina =

Genus of gastropods

Chondrina is a genus of small air-breathing land snails, terrestrial pulmonate gastropod mollusks in the family Chondrinidae.

All species of Chondrina are restricted to the West Palaearctic. Centers of species diversity are found on the Iberian Peninsula, in northern Italy and in the Balkans. The species are restricted to calcareous rocks, and occur only on vertical, exposed rock faces.

== Species ==
There are more than 40 extant species in the genus Chondrina, with four new species described in 2010.

- Chondrina aguilari Altimira, 1967
- Chondrina altimirai Gittenberger, 1973
- Chondrina amphorula Schileyko, 1984
- Chondrina arcadica (Reinhardt, 1881) - per AnimalBase is its synonym Chondrina clienta (Westerlund, 1883) but it is considered valid by other authors
- Chondrina arigonis (Rossmässler, 1859)
- Chondrina arigonoides Kokshoorn & Gittenberger, 2010
- Chondrina ascendens (Westerlund, 1878)
- Chondrina avenacea (Bruguière, 1792) - type species
- Chondrina bergomensis (Küster, 1850)
- Chondrina bigorriensis (Des Moulins, 1835)
- Chondrina calpica (Westerlund, 1872)
- Chondrina centralis (Fagot, 1891)
- Chondrina cliendentata E. Gittenberger, 1973
- Chondrina dertosensis (Bofill, 1886)
- Chondrina falkneri Gittenberger, 2002
- Chondrina farinesii (Des Moulins, 1835)
- Chondrina feneriensis Bodon, Nardi, Cianfanelli & Kokshoorn, 2015
- Chondrina gasulli Gittenberger, 1973
- Chondrina gavirai Ahuir & Torres, 2017
- Chondrina generosensis Nordsieck, 1962
- Chondrina gerhardi Gittenberger, 2002
- Chondrina gomezi Ahuir & Torres, 2017
- Chondrina granatensis Alonso, 1974
- Chondrina guiraonis Pilsbry, 1918
- Chondrina ingae Kokshoorn & Gittenberger, 2010
- Chondrina jumillensis (L. Pfeiffer, 1853)
- Chondrina keltiensis Ahuir & Torres, 2017
- Chondrina klemmi Gittenberger, 1973
- Chondrina kobelti (Westerlund, 1887)
- Chondrina kobeltoides Gittenberger, 1973
- Chondrina lusitanica (Pfeiffer, 1848)
- Chondrina maginensis Arrébola & Gómez, 1998
- Chondrina marjae Kokshoorn & Gittenberger, 2010
- Chondrina marmouchana (Pallary, 1928)
- Chondrina massotiana (Bourguignat, 1863)
- Chondrina megacheilos (De Cristofori & Jan, 1832)
- Chondrina multidentata (Strobel, 1851)
- Chondrina oligodonta (Del Prete, 1879)
- Chondrina pseudavenacea Kokshoorn & Gittenberger, 2010
- Chondrina pseudoteresae Ahuir & Torres, 2017
- Chondrina ricotensis Gómez-Moliner & Somoza-Valdeolmillos, 2023
- Chondrina ripkeni Gittenberger, 1973
- Chondrina soleri Altimira, 1960
- Chondrina spelta (Beck, 1837)
- Chondrina tatrica Ložek, 1948
- Chondrina tenuimarginata (Des Moulins, 1835)
