= Afroguppya =

Scientific classification
- Domain: Eukaryota
- Kingdom: Animalia
- Phylum: Mollusca
- Class: Gastropoda
- Order: Stylommatophora
- Family: Euconulidae
- Genus: Afroguppya de Winter & van Bruggen, 1992

Genus of land snails

Afroguppya is a genus of gastropods belonging to the family Euconulidae.

The species of this genus are found in Africa.

Species:

- Afroguppya rumrutiensis (Preston, 1911)
- Afroguppya solemi de Winter & van Bruggen, 1992
