= Iredaleoconcha =

Scientific classification
- Kingdom: Animalia
- Phylum: Mollusca
- Class: Gastropoda
- Order: Stylommatophora
- Infraorder: Limacoidei
- Superfamily: Trochomorphoidea
- Family: Euconulidae
- Genus: Iredaleoconcha; Preston, 1913

Type species
- Iredaleoconcha inopina Preston, 1913

Genus of gastropods

Iredaleoconcha is a genus of air-breathing land snails or semislugs, terrestrial pulmonate gastropod mollusks in the family Euconulidae.

This genus was named in honor of the malacologist Tom Iredale.

== Species ==
Species within the genus Iredaleoconcha include:

- Iredaleoconcha caporaphe Preston, 1913
- Iredaleoconcha inopina Preston, 1913

== External list ==
- Nomenclator Zoologicus info
- Preston, H. B. (1913). Characters of new genera and species of terrestrial Mollusca from Norfolk Island. The Annals and magazine of natural history; including zoology, botany, and geology. Eighth series. 12 (72): 522-538. London
