= Nancibella =

Scientific classification
- Kingdom: Animalia
- Phylum: Mollusca
- Class: Gastropoda
- Order: Stylommatophora
- Infraorder: Limacoidei
- Superfamily: Trochomorphoidea
- Family: Euconulidae
- Genus: Nancibella; Iredale, 1945

Genus of gastropods

Nancibella is a genus of air-breathing land snails or semislugs, terrestrial pulmonate gastropod mollusks in the family Euconulidae.

== Species ==
Species within the genus Nancibella include:

- Nancibella quintalia (Cox, 1870)
