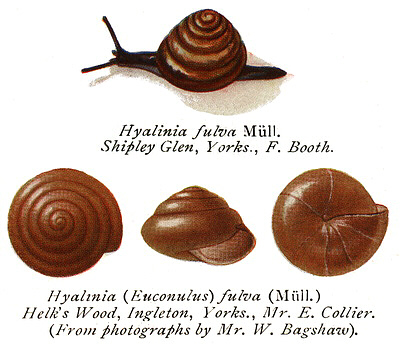
- Euconulus fulvus

Conservation status
- Secure (NatureServe)

Scientific classification
- Kingdom: Animalia
- Phylum: Mollusca
- Class: Gastropoda
- Order: Stylommatophora
- Family: Euconulidae
- Genus: Euconulus
- Species: E. fulvus

Binomial name
- Euconulus fulvus (O. F. Müller, 1774)

= Euconulus fulvus =

Species of gastropod

Euconulus fulvus is a species of very small, air-breathing land snail, a terrestrial pulmonate gastropod mollusk in the family Euconulidae, the hive snails.

== Description ==
For terms see gastropod shell

The 2.0-2.5 x 2.8-3.5 mm shell is broader than high. The colour is yellowish brown. The shell surface on the upper side is rather pale, the lower side is rather silky and smooth. There is no umbilicus and the last whorl with a trace of a keel.

== Distribution ==
This species occurs in countries and islands including:

- Czech Republic
- Ukraine
- Great Britain
- Ireland
- and other areas

== Habitat ==
Euconulus fulvus occurs mainly in coniferous and deciduous forests, where it can be found in the litter or under deadwood pieces. It can tolerate substrates which are non-calcareous.
