= Liardetia =

Scientific classification
- Kingdom: Animalia
- Phylum: Mollusca
- Class: Gastropoda
- Order: Stylommatophora
- Family: Euconulidae
- Genus: Liardetia; Gude, 1913

Genus of gastropods

Liardetia is a genus of land snails in the family Euconulidae, the hive snails.

Species include:

- Liardetia boninensis
- Liardetia doliolum
- Liardetia indifferens
- Liardetia samoensis
- Liardetia sculpta
- Liardetia tenuisculpta
