= Chondrina tatrica =

Scientific classification
- Domain: Eukaryota
- Kingdom: Animalia
- Phylum: Mollusca
- Class: Gastropoda
- Order: Stylommatophora
- Family: Chondrinidae
- Genus: Chondrina
- Species: C. tatrica

Binomial name
- Chondrina tatrica (Ložek, 1948)

Species of gastropod

Chondrina tatrica is a species of small air-breathing land snail, a terrestrial pulmonate gastropod mollusk in the family Chondrinidae.

== Distribution ==
The species occurs in:

- Slovakia
- Romania
