= Chondrina oligodonta =

Conservation status
- Vulnerable (IUCN 3.1)

Scientific classification
- Kingdom: Animalia
- Phylum: Mollusca
- Class: Gastropoda
- Order: Stylommatophora
- Family: Chondrinidae
- Genus: Chondrina
- Species: C. oligodonta

Binomial name
- Chondrina oligodonta (Del Prete, 1879)

Species of gastropod

Chondrina oligodonta is a species of land snail in the family Chondrinidae. It is endemic to Italy, where it is found in rocky habitat. It is threatened by habitat loss and fragmentation, especially due to marble quarrying in the area.
