= Melloconcha =

Scientific classification
- Kingdom: Animalia
- Phylum: Mollusca
- Class: Gastropoda
- Order: Stylommatophora
- Family: Euconulidae
- Subfamily: Microcystinae
- Tribe: Liardetiini
- Genus: Melloconcha; Iredale, 1944
- Location of Lord Howe Island

Synonyms
- Annacharis Iredale, 1944; Tribocystis Iredale, 1944

Genus of land snails

Melloconcha is a genus of six species of tiny glass-snails that are endemic to Australia's Lord Howe Island in the Tasman Sea.

== Species ==
- Melloconcha delecta Iredale, 1944 – tiny amber glass-snail
- Melloconcha flavescens (Iredale, 1944) – tiny yellow glass-snail
- Melloconcha grata Iredale, 1944 – angulate glass-snail
- Melloconcha miranda (Iredale, 1944) – Miranda's glass-snail
- Melloconcha prensa Iredale, 1944 – flattened glass-snail
- Melloconcha rosacea (Iredale, 1944) – tiny rosy glass-snail
