= Palaua (gastropod) =

Scientific classification
- Kingdom: Animalia
- Phylum: Mollusca
- Class: Gastropoda
- Order: Stylommatophora
- Family: Euconulidae
- Genus: Palaua; Baker, 1941

Genus of gastropods

Palaua is a genus of very small air-breathing land snails, terrestrial pulmonate gastropod mollusks in the family Euconulidae, the hive snails. This genus is endemic to Palau.

== Species ==
Species within the genus Palaua include:

- Palaua babelthuapi
- Palaua margaritacea
- Palaua minor
- Palaua ngarduaisi
- Palaua straminea
- Palaua wilsoni
