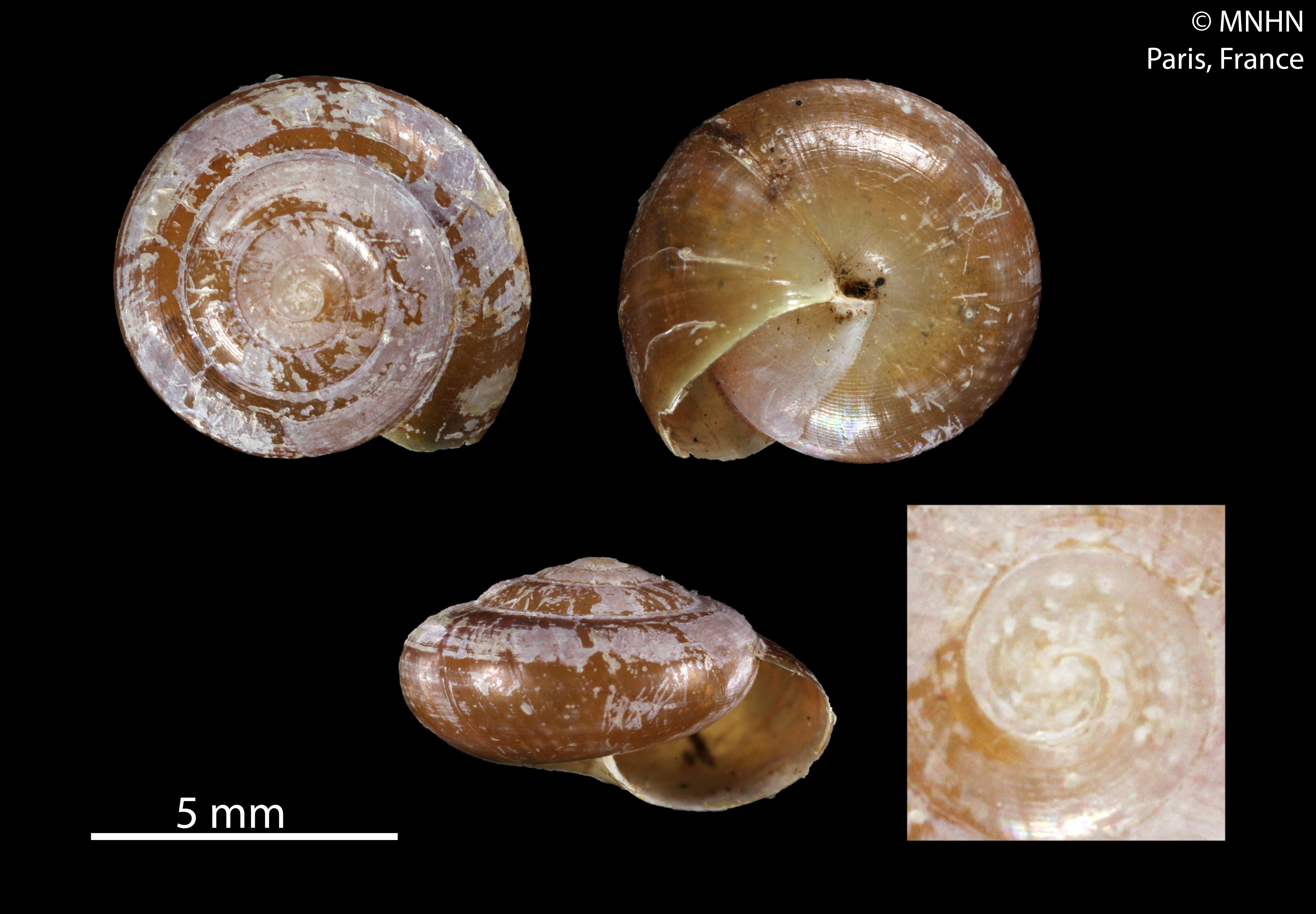
- Shell of Microcystis castanea (paratype at MNHN, Paris)

Scientific classification
- Kingdom: Animalia
- Phylum: Mollusca
- Class: Gastropoda
- Order: Stylommatophora
- Infraorder: Limacoidei
- Superfamily: Trochomorphoidea
- Family: Euconulidae
- Genus: Microcystis; Beck, 1838

Type species
- Nanina (Microcystis) ornatella Beck, 1838

Synonyms
- Ariophanta (Microcystis) Beck, 1838; Helicopsis Beck, 1837 (non Helicopsis Fitzinger, 1833); Helix (Microcystis) Beck, 1838; Hyalina (Microcystis) Beck, 1838; Macrochlamys (Microcystis) Beck, 1838 (unaccepted rank); Microcystina (Microcystis) Beck, 1838 (unaccepted rank); Microcystis (Cnesticystis) H. B. Baker, 1938· accepted, alternate representation; Microcystis (Facorhina) H. B. Baker, 1938· accepted, alternate representation; Microcystis (Leurocystis) H. B. Baker, 1938· accepted, alternate representation; Microcystis (Microcystis) Beck, 1838· accepted, alternate representation; Nanina (Microcystis) H. Beck, 1838 (original combination)

= Microcystis (gastropod) =

Genus of gastropods

Microcystis is a genus of small air-breathing land snails, terrestrial pulmonate gastropod mollusks in the subfamily Microcystinae in the family Euconulidae, the hive snails.

== Species ==
- Microcystis adusta H. B. Baker, 1938
- Microcystis albisuturalis K. C. Emberton, Slapcinsky, Campbell, Rakotondrazafy, Andriamiarison & J. D. Emberton, 2010
- Microcystis ambinanifae Emberton, 1994
- Microcystis andersoni H. B. Baker, 1938
- Microcystis andriamahajai Emberton & Pearce, 2000
- Microcystis anosiana Fischer-Piette, Blanc, C.P., Blanc, F. & Salvat, 1994
- Microcystis argueyrolli Fischer-Piette, Blanc, C.P., Blanc, F. & Salvat, 1994
- Microcystis arnali Fischer-Piette, Blanc, C.P., Blanc, F. & Salvat, 1994
- Microcystis aspera H. B. Baker, 1938
- Microcystis basampla Emberton & Pearce, 2000
- Microcystis benesculpta H. B. Baker, 1938
- Microcystis blanci Emberton & Pearce, 2000
- Microcystis buckorum H. B. Baker, 1938
- Microcystis castanea Emberton & Pearce, 2000
- Microcystis celestinae Emberton & Griffiths, 2009
- Microcystis charpentieri Fischer-Piette, Blanc, C.P., Blanc, F. & Salvat, 1994
- Microcystis compacta Emberton & Pearce, 2000
- Microcystis dyakana Godwin-Austen, 1891
- Microcystis erasmi Fischer-Piette, Blanc, C.P., Blanc, F. & Salvat, 1994
- Microcystis esetra Emberton & Pearce, 2000
- Microcystis esnaulti Fischer-Piette, Blanc, C.P., Blanc, F. & Salvat, 1994
- Microcystis excavata (Fischer-Piette, Blanc, F. & Salvat, 1975)
- Microcystis fosbergi H. B. Baker, 1938
- Microcystis fotsifotsy K. C. Emberton, Slapcinsky, Campbell, Rakotondrazafy, Andriamiarison & J. D. Emberton, 2010
- Microcystis grodji Fischer-Piette, Blanc, C.P., Blanc, F. & Salvat, 1994
- Microcystis hainanica Yen, 1939
- Microcystis ilapiriensis Emberton & Pearce, 2000
- Microcystis josephinae Emberton & Griffiths, 2009
- Microcystis kendrae Emberton & Griffiths, 2009
- Microcystis kondoi H. B. Baker, 1938
- Microcystis kremenae Emberton, 1994
- Microcystis lenticula H. B. Baker, 1938
- Microcystis madecassina (Fischer-Piette, Blanc, F. & Salvat, 1975)
- Microcystis mahermanae Emberton & Pearce, 2000
- Microcystis michellae Emberton & Griffiths, 2009
- Microcystis minensis Möllendorff, 1885
- Microcystis minutis Yen, 1939
- Microcystis navachi Fischer-Piette, Blanc, C.P., Blanc, F. & Salvat, 1994
- Microcystis nitelloides Fischer-Piette, Blanc, F. & Salvat, 1975
- Microcystis oraka Emberton, 2003
- Microcystis ornatella (Beck, 1838)
- Microcystis palmicola Stoliczka, 1873
- Microcystis perahui H. B. Baker, 1938
- Microcystis platysma Emberton, 1994
- Microcystis sahavondrononae Emberton, 1994
- Microcystis saintjohni H. B. Baker, 1938
- Microcystis soa Emberton & Griffiths, 2009
- Microcystis stenomphala Möllendorff, 1884
- Microcystis subangulata Emberton & Pearce, 2000
- Microcystis subplanata Emberton & Pearce, 2000
- Microcystis tangens Fischer-Piette, Blanc, F. & Salvat, 1975
- Microcystis townsendiana (Godwin-Austen & G. Nevill, 1879)
- Microcystis tsara Emberton & Griffiths, 2009
- Microcystis tsingia Emberton, 2003
- Microcystis viaregina Emberton, 1994
- Microcystis vohimenae Emberton & Pearce, 2000
- Microcystis vohimenoides Emberton & Pearce, 2000
- Microcystis vony K. C. Emberton, Slapcinsky, Campbell, Rakotondrazafy, Andriamiarison & J. D. Emberton, 2010
