= Otto Wilhelm Hermann Reinhardt =

Otto Wilhelm Hermann Reinhardt (1838 in Potsdam – 1924 in Berlin) was a German botanist and conchologist. He was a teacher at a trade school in Berlin. Reinhardt was a friend of Paul Friedrich August Ascherson and co-founder of the botanical society in Brandenburg province.

He described the snails Vitrea subrimata in 1871 and Vallonia gracilicosta and Euconulus praticola in 1883. This last is the type species of Reinhardt's genus Euconulus. He was a Member of Gesellschaft Naturforschender Freunde zu Berlin. His collection is curated in Senckenberg Museum.

== Works ==
- Reinhardt, O. 1859 (1860) Lycopodium Selago L. var. recurvum Kit. Verhandlungen des Botanischen Vereins von Berlin und Brandenburg 1:100
- Reinhardt, O. 1860 (1861)Zusatz zu dem Aufsatz von Areschoug über Tortula papillosa Wils.Verhandlungen des Botanischen Vereins von Berlin und Brandenburg 2:210
- Reinhardt, O. 1863 Übersicht der in der Mark Brandenburg bisher beobachteten Laubmoose Verhandlungen des Botanischen Vereins von Berlin und Brandenburg 5:1-52
- Reinhardt, O. 1871. Über die in Deutschland vorkommenden Hyalinen aus der Crystallina-Gruppe. Sitzungsberichte der Gesellschaft Naturforschender Freunde zu Berlin 2: 39–40.
- Reinhardt O. 1881. Eine Anzahl griechischer Schnecken. Sitzungsberichte der Gesellschaft der Naturforschenden Freunde, Berlin 1881 (9): 135–137.
- Reinhardt, O. 1879. Ueber die Isthmia-Arten und ihre geographische Verbreitung. Sitzungsberichte der Gesellschaft Naturforschender Freunde zu Berlin 1879 (9): 133–139.
- Reinhardt, O. 1880. Über die Acme -Arten des Banats und Siebenbürgens. Sitzungsberichte der Gesellschaft Naturforschender Freunde zu Berlin 1880 (2): 45–47.
- Reinhardt, O. 1880. Nachtrag zu seinem in der vorigen Sitzung gehaltenen Vortage über die Orcula-ArtenSitzungsberichte der Gesellschaft Naturforschender Freunde zu Berlin 1880 (2): 44–45.
- Reinhardt, O. 1881. Eine Anzahl griechischer Schnecken. Sitzungsberichte der Gesellschaft Naturforschender Freunde zu Berlin 1881 (9): 135–137.
- Reinhardt, O. 1883. Über die von den Herren Gebrüder Krause auf ihrer Reise gesammelten Pupa -, Hyalina- und Vallonia -Arten. Sitzungsberichte der Gesellschaft Naturforschender Freunde zu Berlin 1883: 37–43.
- Reinhardt, O. 1883. Einige von Herrn D. W. Kobelt in Schwanheim a. M. zur Begutachtung übersandte, von Herrn Hungerford gesammelte japanische Hyalinen Sitzungsberichte der Gesellschaft Naturforschender Freunde zu Berlin 1883: 82–86.
- Reinhardt, O. 1886 Land- und Süsswassermollusken, welche Herr Dr. O. Finsch von seiner letzten Reise nach Neu-Guinea mitgebracht hat Sitzungsberichte der Gesellschaft naturforschender Freunde zu Berlin 1886:57-63.
