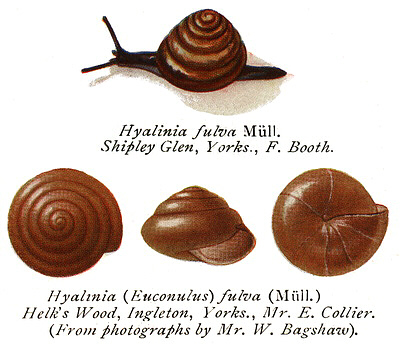
- Euconulus fulvus

Scientific classification
- Domain: Eukaryota
- Kingdom: Animalia
- Phylum: Mollusca
- Class: Gastropoda
- Order: Stylommatophora
- Family: Euconulidae
- Genus: Euconulus; O. W. H. Reinhardt, 1883

Type species
- Helix fulva O. F. Müller, 1774

Synonyms
- Arnouldia Bourguignat, 1891 (junior synonym); Conulus Fitzinger, 1833 (Invalid: junior homonym of Conulus Leske, 1778 [Echinodermata]); Euconulops H. B. Baker, 1928; Euconulus (Chetosyna) H. B. Baker, 1941· accepted, alternate representation; Euconulus (Euconulops) H. B. Baker, 1928· accepted, alternate representation; Euconulus (Euconulus) Reinhardt, 1883· accepted, alternate representation; Euconulus (Monoconulus) H. B. Baker, 1941· accepted, alternate representation; Euconulus (Nesoconulus) H. B. Baker, 1941· accepted, alternate representation; Euconulus (Pellucidomus) H. B. Baker, 1941· accepted, alternate representation; Helix (Conulus) Fitzinger, 1833 (Invalid: junior homonym of Conulus Leske, 1778 [Echinodermata]); Hyalina (Conulus) Fitzinger, 1833 (Invalid: junior homonym of Conulus Leske, 1778 [Echinodermata]); Hyalinia (Arnouldia) Bourguignat, 1891 (junior synonym); Hyalinia (Conulus) Fitzinger, 1833 (Invalid: junior homonym of Conulus Leske, 1778 [Echinodermata]); Trochulus Westerlund, 1886 (invalid: junior homonym of Trochulus Chemnitz, 1786); Turrisitala Iredale, 1933 (unavailable: introduced without description); Zonites (Conulus) Fitzinger, 1833 (Invalid: junior homonym of Conulus Leske, 1778 [Echinodermata])

= Euconulus =

Genus of gastropods

Euconulus is a genus of very small air-breathing land snails, terrestrial pulmonate gastropod mollusks in the family Euconulidae, the hive snails.

== Species ==
Species within the genus Euconulus include:

- Euconulus alderi (Gray, 1840)
- † Euconulus alveolus (F. Sandberger, 1887)
- Euconulus chersinus (Say, 1821)
- Euconulus conoides H. B. Baker, 1941
- Euconulus crami Fischer-Piette, Blanc, C.P., Blanc, F. & Salvat, 1994
- Euconulus dentatus (Sterki, 1893)
- Euconulus deroni Fischer-Piette, Blanc, C.P., Blanc, F. & Salvat, 1994
- Euconulus fresti Horsáková, Nekola & Horsák, 2020
- Euconulus fulvus (O. F. Müller, 1774)
- Euconulus gaetanoi (Pilsbry & Vanatta, 1908)
- Euconulus konaensis (Sykes, 1896)
- Euconulus lubricella (Ancey, 1904)
- Euconulus martinezi (Hidalgo, 1869)
- Euconulus microsoma (Morelet, 1883)
- Euconulus pittieri (Martens, 1892)
- Euconulus polygyratus (Pilsbry, 1899)
- † Euconulus styriacus Harzhauser, Neubauer & H. Binder, 2014
- Euconulus subtilissimus (A. Gould, 1847)
- Euconulus thaanumi (Ancey, 1904)
- Euconulus thurstoni H. B. Baker, 1941
- Euconulus trochiformis (Montagu, 1803)
- Euconulus trochulus (O. W. H. Reinhardt, 1883)
- Euconulus turbinatus Gulick, 1904

Species brought into synonymy

- Euconulus alveus F. Sandberger, 1887 † : synonym of Euconulus alveolus (F. Sandberger, 1887) † (incorrect subsequent spelling)
- Euconulus callopisticus (Bourguignat, 1880) : synonym of Euconulus fulvus fulvus (O. F. Müller, 1774) (junior synonym)
- Euconulus kaliellaeformis (Klebs, 1886) † : synonym of Kaliella kaliellaeformis (Klebs, 1886) †
- Euconulus mcleodensis Russell, 1929 † : synonym of Grangerella mcleodensis (Russell, 1929) † (new combination)
- Euconulus micra (Morelet, 1882) : synonym of Euconulus crami Fischer-Piette, Blanc, C.P., Blanc, F. & Salvat, 1994 (junior homonym)
- Euconulus praticola (O. W. H. Reinhardt, 1883) : synonym of Euconulus alderi (Gray, 1840) (junior synonym)
- Euconulus reinhardti Pilsbry, 1900 : synonym of Parasitala reinhardti (Pilsbry, 1900) (original combination)
- Euconulus trochiformis (Montagu, 1803) : synonym of Euconulus fulvus fulvus (O. F. Müller, 1774) (junior synonym)
