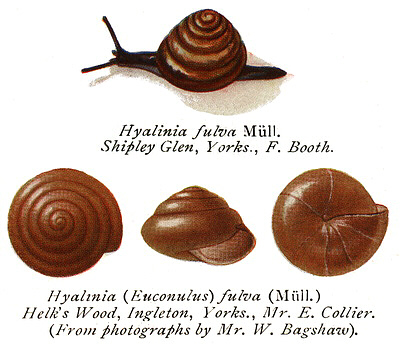
- Drawing of a live Euconulus fulvus and its shell

Scientific classification
- Kingdom: Animalia
- Phylum: Mollusca
- Class: Gastropoda
- Order: Stylommatophora
- Suborder: Helicina
- Infraorder: Limacoidei
- Superfamily: Trochomorphoidea
- Family: Euconulidae; Baker, 1928

Genera
- See text

= Euconulidae =

Family of gastropods

Euconulidae is a taxonomic family of minute, air-breathing land snails, terrestrial pulmonate gastropod mollusks or micromollusks in the superfamily Trochomorphoidea.

This land snail family is closely allied to the Zonitidae, the glass snails.

== Taxonomy ==
The family Euconulidae was originally placed within the superfamily Gastrodontoidea according to the taxonomy of the Gastropoda (Bouchet & Rocroi, 2005). Since 2017, its classification has been revised and it now belongs to the superfamily Trochomorphoidea

== Distribution ==
The distribution of the Euconulidae includes the Nearctic, the western-Palearctic, the eastern-Palearctic, the Neotropical zone, the Ethiopian zone, Malagasy, south-eastern Asia, Australia, Polynesia and Hawaii.

Humidity, temperature, rainfall, and foliar dripping derived from dew, mist, and rain, affect the behavior and substrate selection of small terrestrial molluscs, such as Tikoconus costarricanus, which inhabit shrubs in humid tropical montane forests. There is also a preference of some parts of a leaf, for example, in some cases the lower side is preferred, possibly because it has better humidity and protects small snails from the impact of raindrops.

== Shell description ==
These minute snails have a shell which is roundly conical and broad-based, like the shape of an old-fashioned European woven bee hive or skep. For this reason these snails are sometimes known as "hive snails".

The shells of most Euconulidae are only about 3 mm in size, amber-colored and translucent.

== Anatomy ==
In this family, the number of haploid chromosomes lies between 26 and 30 (according to the values in this table).

== Genera ==
Subfamilies and genera in the family Euconulidae include:

Euconulinae

- Afroconulus Van Mol & van Bruggen, 1971
- Afroguppya de Winter & Bruggen, 1992
- Afropunctum F. Haas, 1934
- Cancelloconus I. Rensch, 1932
- Coneuplecta Möllendorff, 1893
- Diepenheimia Preston, 1913
- Discoconulus Reinhardt, 1883
- Dryachloa F. G. Thompson & H. G. Lee, 1980
- Euconulus Reinhardt, 1883 - type genus of the family Euconulidae
- Guppya Mörch, 1867
- Habroconus Crosse & P. Fischer, 1872
- Kororia H. B. Baker, 1941
- Louisia Godwin-Austen, 1908
- Luchuconulus Pilsbry, 1928
- Palaua H.B. Baker, 1941
- Papuarion Van Mol, 1973
- Parasitala Thiele, 1931
- Sabalimax Tillier & Bouchet, 1989
- Serostena Iredale, 1941
- Tikoconus Barrientos, 2019
- Velifera W.G. Binney, 1879

Microcystinae

- Allenoconcha Preston, 1913
- Aukena Baker, 1940
- Cookeana
- Diastole Gude, 1913
- Faunulena
- Greenwoodoconcha
- Hiona Cooke, 1940
- Innesoconcha Iredale, 1944
- Iredaleoconcha Preston, 1913
- Kaala
- Kusaiea Baker, 1938
- Lamprocystis
- Liardetia
- Melloconcha Iredale, 1944
- Mendana
- Microcystis
- Nancibella
- Periclocystis
- Philonesia Sykes, 1900
- Piena
- Pukaloa
- Tengchiena

== Cladogram ==
The following cladogram shows the phylogenic relationships of this family with the other families within the limacoid clade:

- limacoid clade
  - Staffordioidea
    Staffordiidae
  - - - Dyakioidea
        Dyakiidae
      - Gastrodontoidea
        - Pristilomatidae
        - - Chronidae
          - - Euconulidae
            - Trochomorphidae
          - - Gastrodontidae
            - Oxychilidae
    - - Parmacelloidea
        - Trigonochlamydidae
        - Parmacellidae
        - Milacidae
      - - - Zonitoidea
            Zonitidae
          - Helicarionoidea
            - Helicarionidae
            - - Ariophantidae
              - Urocyclidae
        - Limacoidea
          - Vitrinidae
          - - Boettgerillidae
            - - Limacidae
              - Agriolimacidae
