= Eximiorhagada asperrima =

Conservation status
- Data Deficient (IUCN 2.3)

Scientific classification
- Kingdom: Animalia
- Phylum: Mollusca
- Class: Gastropoda
- Order: Stylommatophora
- Family: Camaenidae
- Genus: Eximiorhagada
- Species: E. asperrima

Binomial name
- Eximiorhagada asperrima Hedley, 1905

Species of gastropod

Eximiorhagada asperrima is a species of air-breathing land snail, a terrestrial pulmonate gastropod mollusk in the family Camaenidae. This species is endemic to Australia.
