= Succinea quadrasi =

Conservation status
- Endangered (IUCN 2.3)

Scientific classification
- Kingdom: Animalia
- Phylum: Mollusca
- Class: Gastropoda
- Order: Stylommatophora
- Family: Succineidae
- Genus: Succinea
- Species: S. quadrasi

Binomial name
- Succinea quadrasi Möllendorff, 1894

Species of gastropod

Succinea quadrasi is a species of air-breathing land snail, a terrestrial gastropod mollusc in the family Succineidae, the amber snails.

== Distribution ==
This species is endemic to Guam.

== See also ==
List of land snails of the Mariana Islands
