= List of land snails of the Mariana Islands =

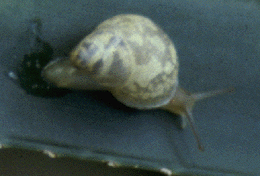
Samoana fragilis (fragile tree snail), a critically endangered snail endemic to Guam and Rota

The following is a list of terrestrial snails found in the Mariana Islands. The general term for land snails in Chamorro is akaleha’. It has been estimated there are about 100 species of land snail on Guam, the southernmost Mariana Island, but about 20 of these have been introduced by human activities.

== Conservation ==
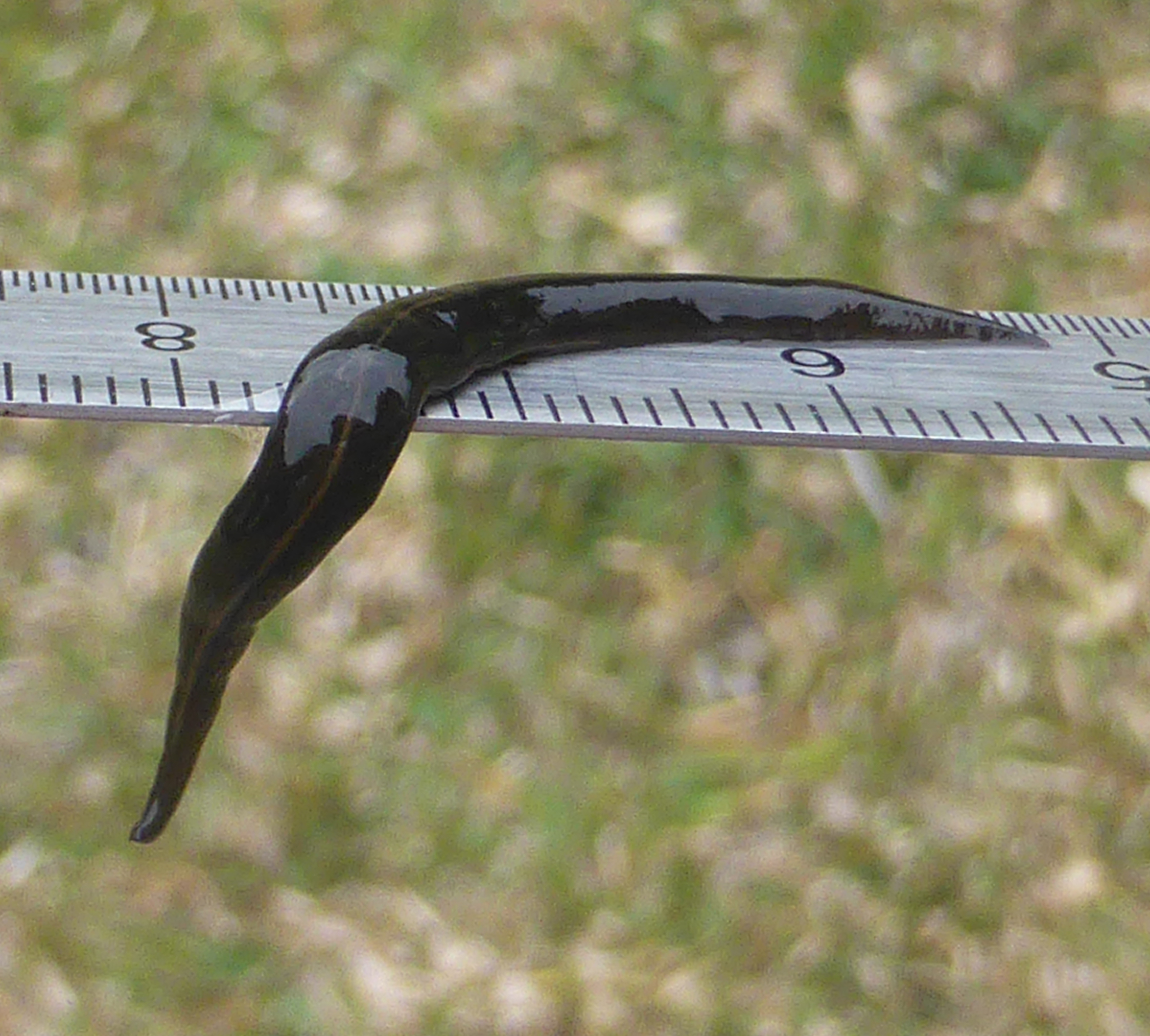
Platydemas manokwari (New Guinea flatworm), an invasive species in the Mariana Islands

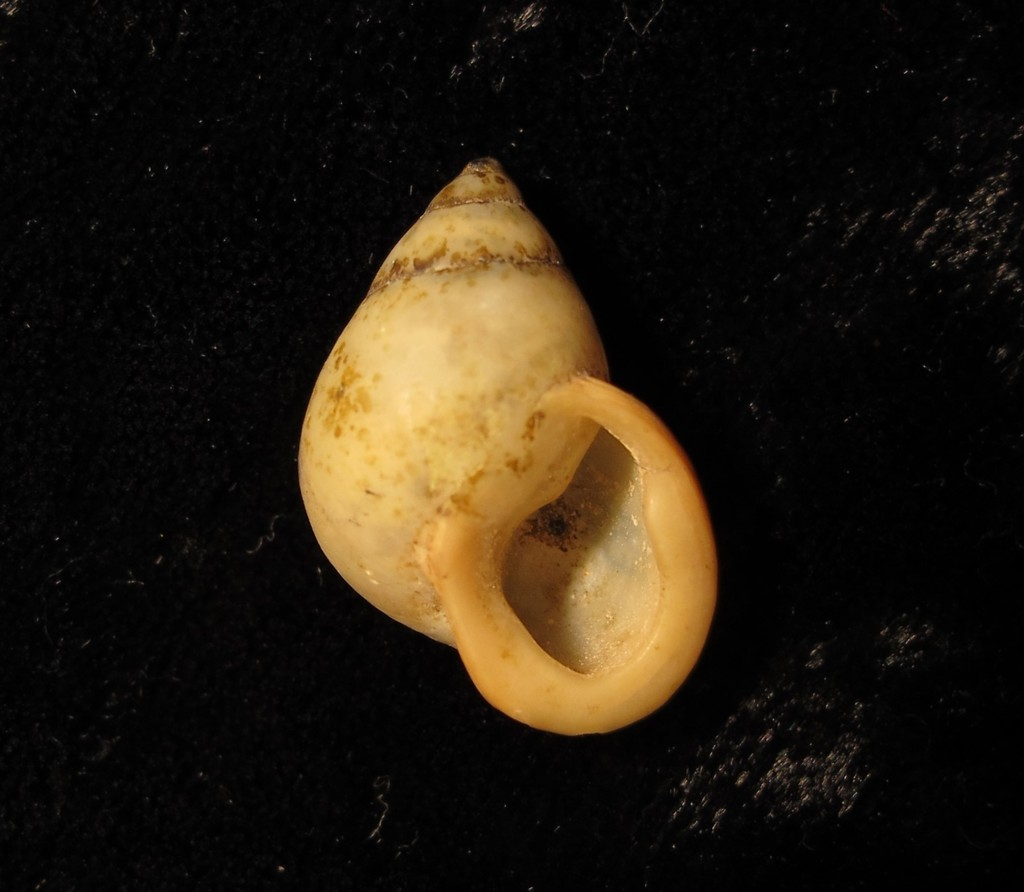
Partula desolata, an extinct species endemic to Guam, known only from an archeological dig

Nearly all of the native species of land snail are in decline throughout the Mariana Islands, and many have not been seen for decades. Some of the following species have not been seen since the time they were first collected. The southern islands of the Mariana archipelago are now almost devoid of native land snails. Land snails face threats from habitat destruction and from introduced predatory snails. The predatory Gonaxis snails and rosy wolfsnails (Euglandina rosea) were introduced as biocontrols against the invasive giant African land snail (Lissachatina fulica), but they also reduced the population of native snails. Since then, all three of these species are now reduced by another biocontrol, the New Guinea flatworm (Platydemas manokwari), which is also predating native snails.

The tiny islet of Alupat off Guam has been identified as a potential site for a snail preserve, as it has not been invaded by New Guinea flatworms, rosy wolfsnails, or Gonaxis snails.

== Endemic snails ==
=== Assimineidae (palmleaf snails) ===
- Allepithema spp. - two undescribed species of Allepithema have been reported.
- Allepithema fulvum - Guam
- Allepithema glabratum - Guam
- Allepithema pyramis - Guam
- Allepithema quadrasi - Guam and possibly Rota and Tinian
- Allepithema tuberculatum - Guam
- Allepithema turritum - Guam
- Chalicopoma laevigatum - Guam and Rota
- Chalicopoma semicostulatum - Guam and Rota
- Omphalotropis cookei - Guam, Rota, Saipan and Sarigan
- Omphalotropis elegans - Guam and Rota
- Omphalotropis elongatula - Guam and Rota. Identified on Cocos and Alupat islands between 2016 and 2019.
- Omphalotropis erosa - Guam and Sarigan
- Omphalotropis gracilis - Guam
- Omphalotropis guamensis - Guam
- Omphalotropis laticosta - Guam
- Omphalotropis latilabris - Guam
- Omphalotropis ochthogyra - Guam and Rota
- Omphalotropis picta - Guam Identified on Alupat Island off Guam between 2016 and 2019
- Omphalotropis pilosa - Guam
- Omphalotropis quadrasi - Guam and Rota Has been identified on Guam as late as 2024.
- Omphalotropis suturalis - Guam and Rota
- Omphalotropis sp. - five undescribed species from subfossil deposits in Rota
- Omphalotropis sp. - an undescribed species from Rota
- Paludinella conica - Guam, Rota, Saipan, Sarigan
- Quadrasiella clathrata - Guam
- Quadrasiella mucronata - Rota and Tinian

=== Diplommatinidae (staircase snails) ===
- Palaina hyalina - Guam, Sarigan, Aguijan
- Palaina taeniolata - Guam, Rota, Saipan, Aguijan Identified on Alupat and Cocos islands off Guam between 2016 and 2019, and on Guam in 2022

=== Hydrocenidae ===
- Georissa biangulata - Guam and Sarigan Has been identified on Guam in 2024.
- Georissa elegans - Guam, Rota, Aguijan
- Georissa laevigata - Rota and Aguijan Identified on Alupat and Cocos islands off Guam between 2016 and 2019

=== Truncatellidae (looping snails) ===
- Taheitia alata - Guam
- Taheitia lamellicosta - Guam
- Taheitia parvula - Guam
- Taheitia subauriculata - Guam
- Truncatella expansilabris - Guam

=== Achatinellidae ===
- Elasmias quadrasi - Guam, Rota, Aguijan, TInian, Saipan, possibly Anatahan, Alamagan, Agrihan, Asuncion and Maug. Has been identified on Guam and Saipan as late as 2024.
- Lamellidea microstoma - Guam, Rota, Tinian, Saipan, possibly Sarigan, Alamagan, Agrihan, Asuncion and Maug
- Lamellidea moellendorffiana - Guam, Rota, Tinian, Saipan, possibly Sarigan, Alamagan, Agrihan, Asuncion and Maug
- Lamellidea subcylindrica - Guam and Rota, possibly Sarigan, Alamagan, Agrihan, Asuncion and Maug

=== Charopidae ===
- Himeroconcha fusca - Guam
- Himeroconcha lamlanensis - Guam
- Himeroconcha quadrasi - Guam and Rota
- Himeroconcha rotula - Guam and Rota
- Ladronellum mariannarum - Guam
- Semperdon heptaptychius - Rota and northern Guam
- Semperdon rotanus - Rota

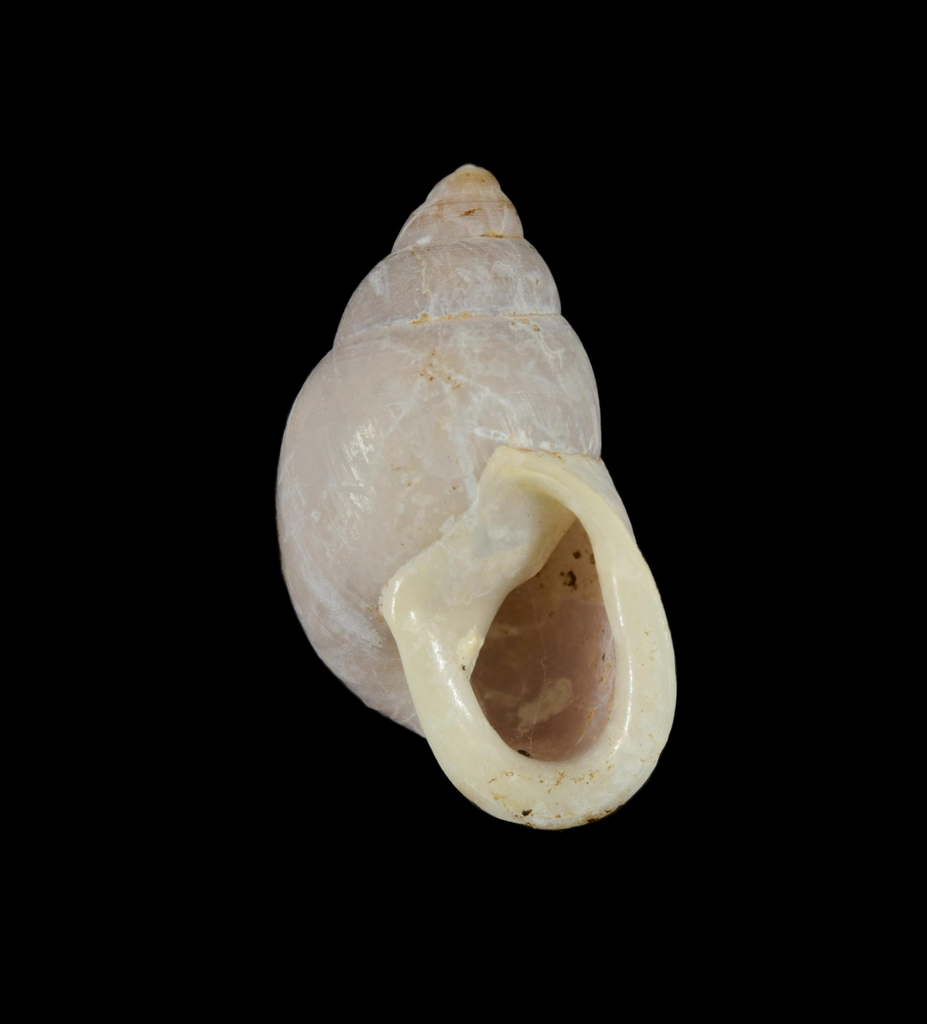
Partula salifana (Mount Alifana partula), endemic to Guam, now extinct

=== Euconulidae ===
- Lamprocystis denticulata - Guam, Rota and Saipan
- Lamprocystis fastigata - Guam, Rota, and Tinian
- Lamprocystis hornbosteli - Guam
- Lamprocystis misella - Guam

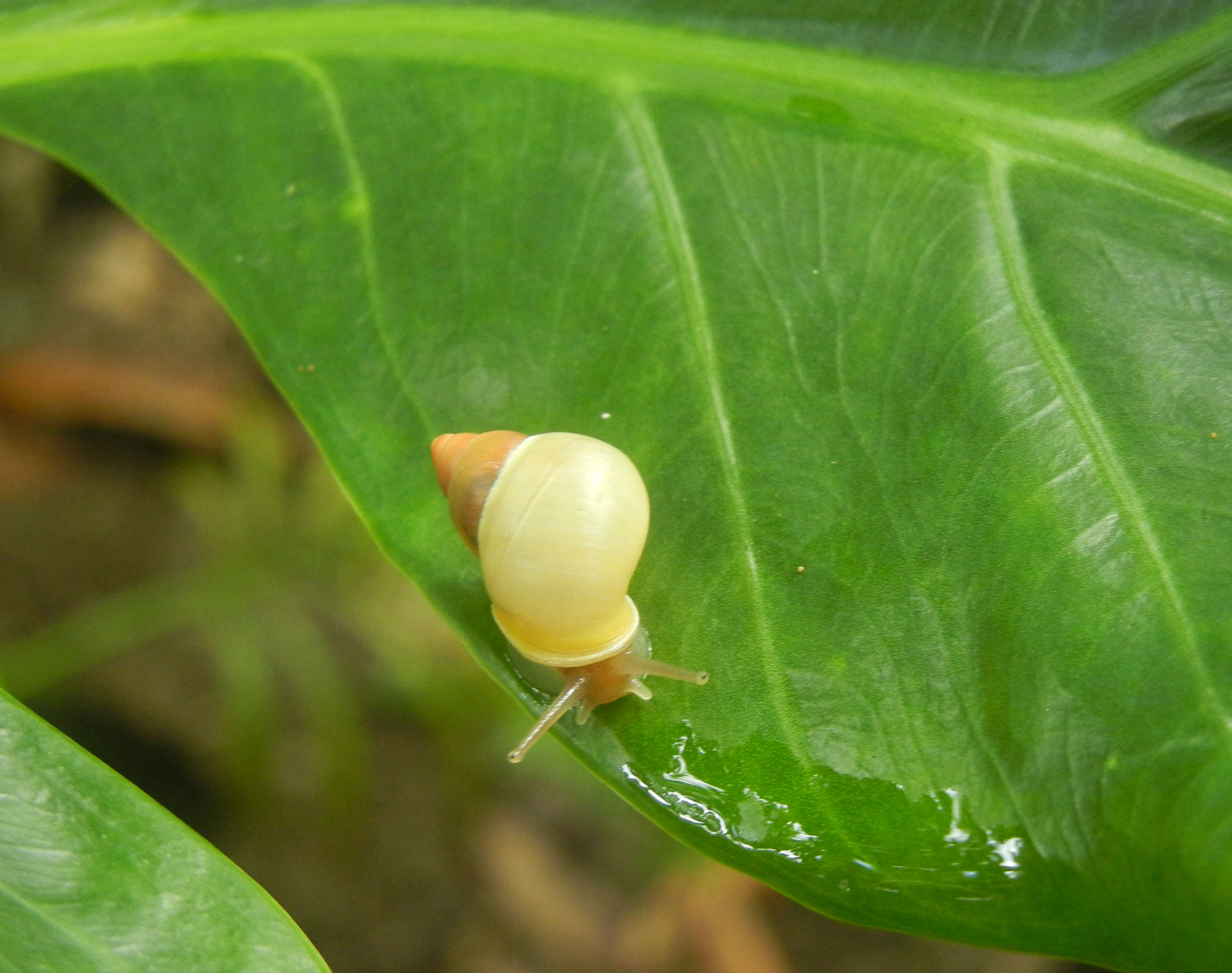
Partula gibba (Fat Guam partulid), endemic to Guam, a critically endangered species

=== Partulidae ===
- Partula gibba (Fat Guam partulid) - Guam, Rota, Aguijan, Tinian, Saipan, Anatahan, Sarigan, Alamagan, and Pagan. CRITICALLY ENDANGERED (IUCN)
- Partula langfordi (Langford's tree snail) - Aguijan; EXTINCT (IUCN)
- Partula radiolata (Guam streaked tree snail) - Guam. CRITICALLY ENDANGERED (IUCN)
- Partula salifana (Mount Alifana partula) - Guam; EXTINCT (IUCN)
- Samoana fragilis (Fragile tree snail) - Guam and Rota. CRITICALLY ENDANGERED (IUCN)

=== Succineidae (amber snails) ===
- Succinea guamensis - Guam
- Succinea piratarum - Guam. ENDANGERED (IUCN)
- Succinea quadrasi - Guam. ENDANGERED (IUCN)
- Succinea species - Guam. Unidentified species house in the Bernice P. Bishop Museum reported by B.D. Smith

=== Vertiginidae (whorl snails) ===
- Nesopupa quadrasi quadrasi - Guam, possibly also Rota, Aguijan, Tinian and Saipan
- Nesopupa sp. - undescribed species

=== Pupillidae ===
- Ptychalaea sp. - undescribed species from Sarigan, Alamagan, Pagan, Agrihan, Asuncion, and Maug

== Non-endemic, possibly native snails ==
=== Assimineidae (palmleaf snails) ===
- Omphalotropis granum - known from Australia, Melanesia and Micronesia; found on Guam, Saipan and Rota Identified on Alupat and Cocos islands off Guam between 2016 and 2019

=== Truncatellidae (looping snails) ===
- Taheitia mariannarum - widespread in Pacific, common on Guam, Rota and Saipan Identified on Alupat and Cocos islands off Guam between 2016 and 2019
- Truncatella guerinii - widespread distribution; found on Guam and Saipan

=== Ellobiidae (hollow-shelled snails) ===
- Melampus castaneus - widespread in western and central Pacific.
- Pythia scarabaeus - widespread in western Pacific; found on Guam, Rota, Aguijan and Saipan Identified on Alupat and Cocos islands off Guam between 2016 and 2019

=== Euconulidae ===
- Liardetia sculpta - found from China to Micronesia; in the Marian Islands, found on Guam and Rota
- Liardetia tenuisculpta - found from Philippines to Micronesia; in the Mariana Islands, found on Guam and Rota

== Introduced species ==
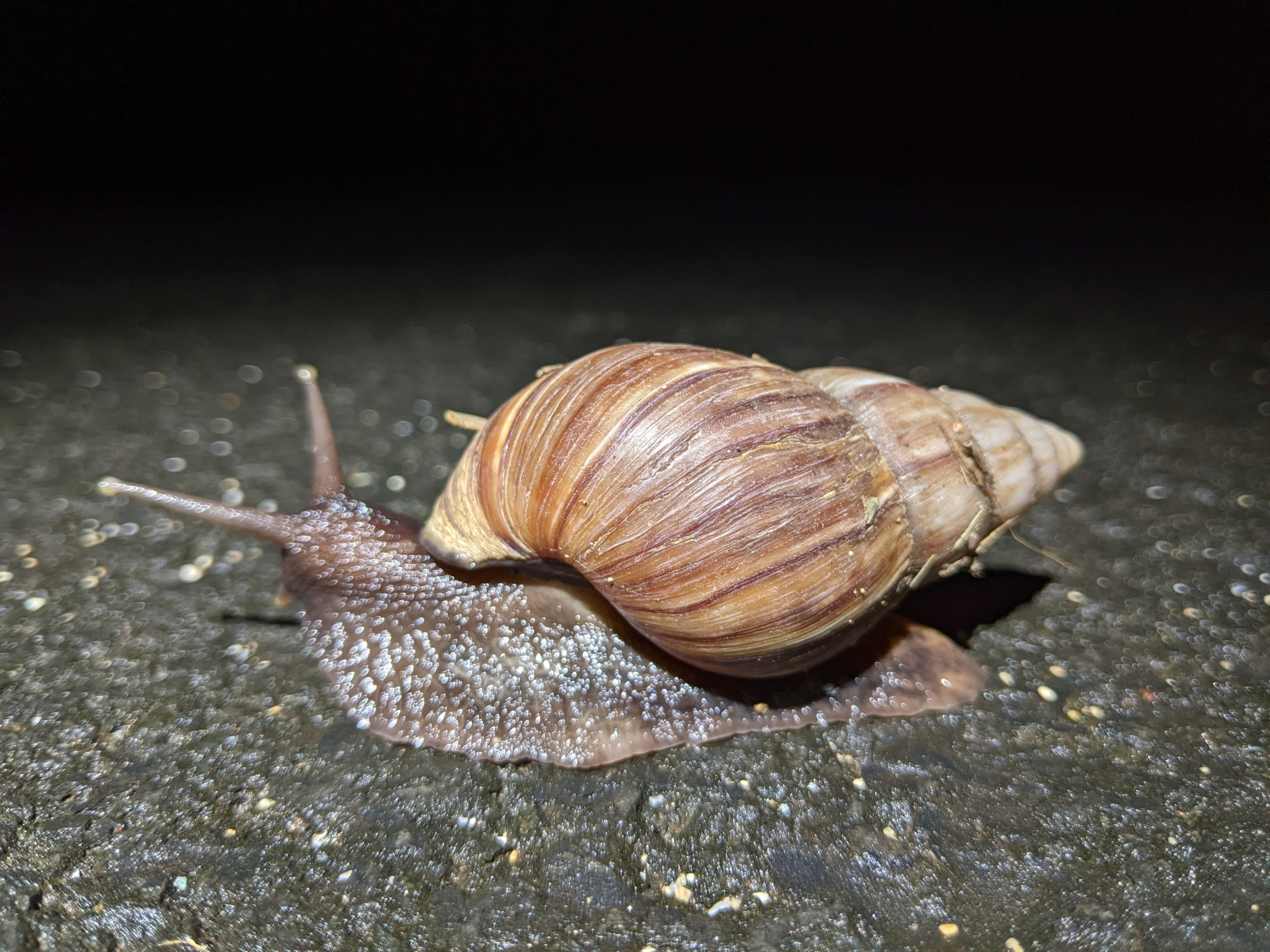
African Giant Snail (Lissachatina fulica), an introduced species in the Marianas

=== Achatinidae ===
- Lissachatina fulica (Giant African land snail) - introduced to the Guam in 1945, and to Rota, Tinian, Saipan, Pagan and Agrihan between 1936 and 1939

=== Achatinellidae ===
- Pacificella variabilis - widespread in Pacific; found on Guam and Rota, possibly Sarigan, Alamagan, Agrihan, Asuncion and Maug

=== Assimineidae (palmleaf snails) ===
- Assiminea parvula guamensis - native to Philippines; found on Guam

=== Bradybaeninae ===
- Bradybaena similaris (Asian trampsnail)- native to Asia but introduced to Mariana Islands in 1948; found in Guam and Saipan

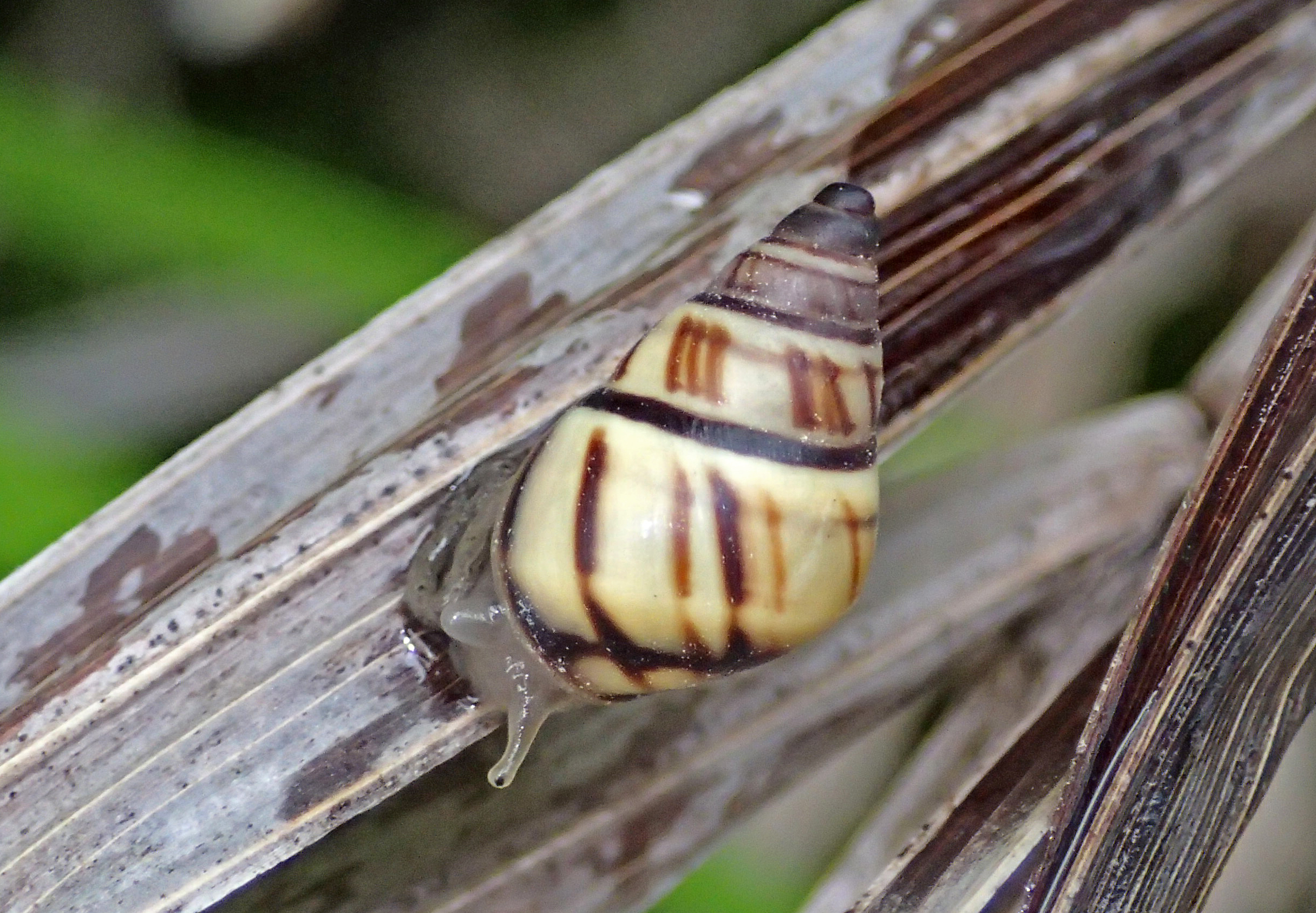
Mesembrinus multilineatus (lined treesnail), an introduced species commonly seen in the Mariana Islands

=== Bulimulidae ===
- Mesembrinus multilineatus (lined treesnail) - native to the Americas, but introduced to Guam, likely from cultivated plants, before 1978

=== Camaenidae ===
- Satsuma succincta - native to Taiwan, first found on Guam in 1982

=== Euconulidae ===
- Coneuplecta calculosa (Tropical beehive snail) - known from India to Polynesia; in the Mariana Islands, found only on Agrihan
- Liardetia doliolum - probably native to Philippines; in the Mariana Islands, found on Guam, Tinian and Rota

=== Ferussaciidae ===
- Cecilioides aperta - native to Caribbean; found on Guam, possibly Sarigan and Alamagan

=== Spiraxidae ===
- Euglandina rosea (rosy wolfsnail) - native to southeast US but introduced to Pacific Islands and Asia by 1957; found on Guam, Saipan and Agrihan

=== Streptaxidae ===
- Gonaxis kibweziensis - native to tropical east Africa; introduced to Aguijan in 1950, Guam in 1954, and Pagan by 1992
- Gonaxis quadrilateralis - native to tropical east Africa; introduced to Guam in 1967; also introduced to Saipan by 1979 but may not have established
- Huttonella bicolor - native to Asia or Africa; perhaps a prehistoric introduction to Pacific Islands; found on Guam, Saipan and Pagan

=== Subulininae ===
- Allopeas gracile (graceful awlsnail) - probably native to New World tropics; in the Marianas, known from Guam, Tinian and Saipan, possibly Agrihan, Alamagan, Asuncion, Guguan, Maug, Pagan, and Sarigan
- Opeas hannense (dwarf awlsnail) - probably native to New World tropics
- Paropeas achatinaceum - native to Indonesia; found on Guam and Sarigan
- Subulina octona - native to New World tropics but prehistorically introduced to Pacific Islands; found on Guam, Aguijan, Tinian, Saipan, Anatahan, and Pagan

=== Succineidae (amber snails) ===
- Succinea luteola (Mexico ambersnail) - native to southeast US, but introduced to Guam by 2012

=== Valloniidae ===
- Pupisoma dioscoricola - native to South Africa through southern Asia and Japan; introduced widely in the Pacific; found on Sarigan, Alamagan, Pagan, Agrihan, Asuncion, and Maug

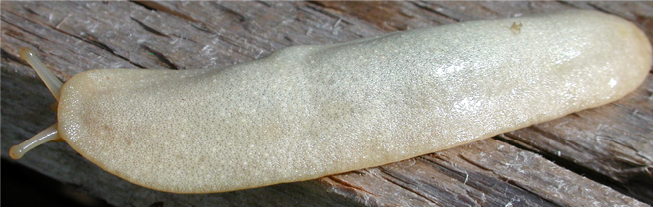
Veronicella cubensis (Cuban slug), an invasive species on Guam

=== Veronicellidae (leatherleaf slugs) ===
- Veronicella cubensis (Cuban slug) - native to Cuba; introduced to Guam in 1993 and Rota in 1997
- Laevicaulis alte (tropical leatherleaf) - native to central Africa; found on Alamagan
- Sarasinula plebeia (bean slug) - native to Brazil and Caribbean; found on Tinian and Saipan

=== Vertiginidae (whorl snails) ===
- Gastrocopta pediculus - probably native to Philippines and southeast Asia; found on Rota, Sarigan, Guguan, Alamagan Asuncion and Maug
- Gastrocopta servilis - native to west India; found on Guam and Saipan, possibly Rota, Sarigan, Guguan, Alamagan Asuncion and Maug

== See also ==
- List of threatened, endangered and extinct species in the Mariana Islands § Gastropods
