= Omphalotropis striatapila =

Conservation status
- Data Deficient (IUCN 2.3)

Scientific classification
- Kingdom: Animalia
- Phylum: Mollusca
- Class: Gastropoda
- Subclass: Caenogastropoda
- Order: Littorinimorpha
- Family: Assimineidae
- Genus: Omphalotropis
- Species: O. striatapila

Binomial name
- Omphalotropis striatapila Möllendorf, 1897

Species of gastropod

Omphalotropis striatapila is a species of small, salt marsh snail with an operculum, aquatic gastropod mollusks, or micromollusks, in the family Assimineidae. This species is endemic to Palau.
