= Lamellidea subcylindrica =

Conservation status
- Data Deficient (IUCN 2.3)

Scientific classification
- Kingdom: Animalia
- Phylum: Mollusca
- Class: Gastropoda
- Order: Stylommatophora
- Family: Achatinellidae
- Genus: Lamellidea
- Species: L. subcylindrica

Binomial name
- Lamellidea subcylindrica (Möllendorff & Quadras, 1894)

Species of gastropod

Lamellidea subcylindrica is a species of air-breathing tropical land snails, terrestrial pulmonate gastropod mollusks in the family Achatinellidae. This species is found in Guam and the Northern Mariana Islands.

== See also ==
List of land snails of the Mariana Islands
