= Himeroconcha fusca =

Conservation status
- Data Deficient (IUCN 2.3)

Scientific classification
- Kingdom: Animalia
- Phylum: Mollusca
- Class: Gastropoda
- Order: Stylommatophora
- Family: Charopidae
- Genus: Himeroconcha
- Species: H. fusca

Binomial name
- Himeroconcha fusca Quadras & Möllendorf, 1894

Species of gastropod

Himeroconcha fusca is a species of small air-breathing land snails, terrestrial pulmonate gastropod mollusks in the family Charopidae. This species is endemic to Guam.

== See also ==
List of land snails of the Mariana Islands
