= Omphalotropis elongatula =

Conservation status
- Data Deficient (IUCN 2.3)

Scientific classification
- Kingdom: Animalia
- Phylum: Mollusca
- Class: Gastropoda
- Subclass: Caenogastropoda
- Order: Littorinimorpha
- Family: Assimineidae
- Genus: Omphalotropis
- Species: O. elongatula

Binomial name
- Omphalotropis elongatula Quadras & Möllendorff, 1894

Species of gastropod

Omphalotropis elongatula is a species of small salt marsh snail with an operculum, a terrestrial gastropod mollusk, or micromollusk, in the family Assimineidae. This species is endemic to Guam.

== See also ==
List of land snails of the Mariana Islands
