= Lamprocystis denticulata =

Conservation status
- Data Deficient (IUCN 2.3)

Scientific classification
- Kingdom: Animalia
- Phylum: Mollusca
- Class: Gastropoda
- Order: Stylommatophora
- Family: Microcystidae
- Genus: Lamprocystis
- Species: L. denticulata

Binomial name
- Lamprocystis denticulata (Quadras & von Möllendorff, 1894)

Species of gastropod

Lamprocystis denticulata is a species of small air-breathing land snail, a terrestrial pulmonate gastropod mollusc in the family Euconulidae, the hive snails. This species is found in Guam and Northern Mariana Islands.

== See also ==
List of land snails of the Mariana Islands
