= Amphidromus kuehni =

Scientific classification
- Kingdom: Animalia
- Phylum: Mollusca
- Class: Gastropoda
- Order: Stylommatophora
- Family: Camaenidae
- Genus: Amphidromus
- Species: A. kuehni

Binomial name
- Amphidromus kuehni Möllendorff, 1902

Synonyms
- Amphidromus (Syndromus) kuehni Möllendorff, 1902 alternative representation

Species of gastropod

Amphidromus kuehni is a species of air-breathing land snail, a terrestrial pulmonate gastropod mollusc in the family Camaenidae.

This is the only dextral species in the subgenus Syndromus.

== Description ==
The length of the shell attains 36 mm, its diameter 18 mm.

(Original description in Latin) The shell is dextral and semi-obtectly perforate (partially covering the umbilicus), exhibiting a turreted-oblong shape. It feels rather thin and presents a slightly finely striated surface that is decussately patterned with microscopic spiral lines, giving it a somewhat glossy appearance. The ground color is yellowish, adorned with narrow interrupted chestnut or brown bands, which rarely merge into streaks. The spire is turreted and terminates in a blunt blackish apex. Comprising six and a half somewhat convex whorls, the body whorl appears more convex and features two slightly wider and darker bands below the periphery, while the area around the perforation is painted reddish. The aperture is moderately oblique and elongate oval. The peristome is shortly expanded above and rather broadly expanded externally and at the base, appearing somewhat reflected. The columella is strongly dilated above.
