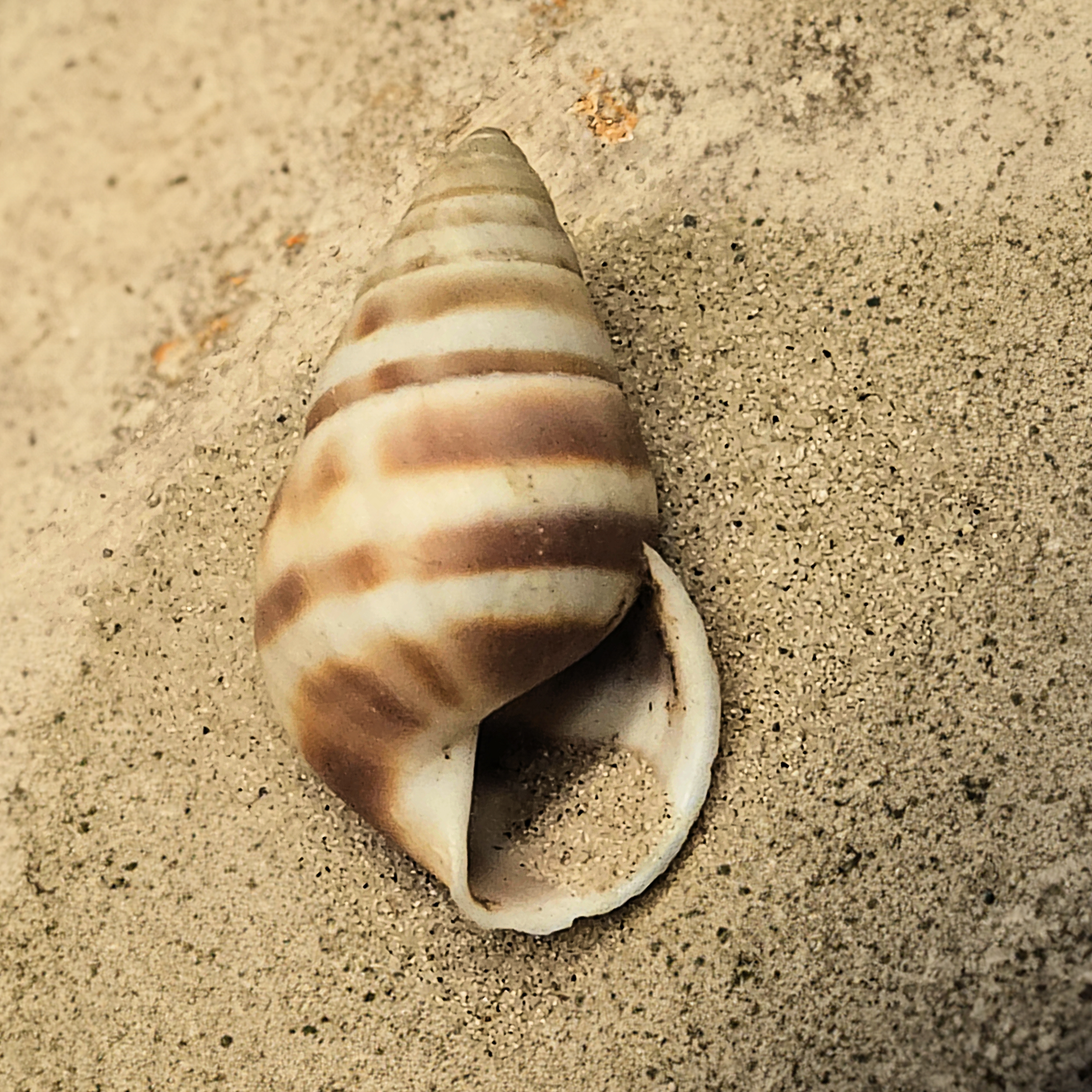
- Shell of Amphidromus metabletus

Scientific classification
- Kingdom: Animalia
- Phylum: Mollusca
- Class: Gastropoda
- Order: Stylommatophora
- Family: Camaenidae
- Genus: Amphidromus
- Species: A. metabletus

Binomial name
- Amphidromus metabletus Möllendorff, 1900

Synonyms
- Amphidromus metabletus insularis Möllendorff, 1901 junior subjective synonym; Amphidromus metabletus pachychilus Möllendorff, 1901 junior subjective synonym

= Amphidromus metabletus =

Species of medium-sized air-breathing tree snail

Amphidromus metabletus is a species of medium-sized air-breathing tree snail, an arboreal gastropod mollusk in the family Camaenidae.

== Description ==
The length of the shell varies between 36.5 mm and 46.5 mm, its diameter between 20.9 mm and 27.2 mm.

The shell ranges from medium to large in size. It exhibits chirality dimorphism, and presents an elongate conical shape that is rather thick and glossy. The spire varies from elongate conical to ovate conical. The apex appears acute, lacking a black spot on its tip, and the earlier whorls show a whitish to tinted pink coloration. Comprising six to seven convex to smooth whorls, the shell displays a wide and shallow suture, and the body whorl is well rounded. The periostracum is thin and corneous; a varix is usually absent. The shell's ground color varies from whitish and yellowish to reddish brown; the banding pattern is variable, ranging from non-banded (monochrome color) to featuring narrow to wide multiple reddish-brown spiral bands on a whitish or yellowish ground color. The parietal callus is slightly thickened and either whitish or transparent. The aperture is ovate; the peristome is expanded but not reflected. The outer lip appears whitish. The columella is straight and can be either thick or thin. The umbilicus is imperforate.

The radula features teeth arranged in anteriorly pointed V-shaped rows. The central tooth is monocuspid and short-spatulate with a truncated cusp. The lateral teeth are bicuspid; the endocone appears small, with a wide notch and a blunt cusp; the ectocone is large with a blunt cusp. The lateral teeth gradually transform into asymmetric tricuspid marginal teeth.

The genital organs feature a relatively short atrium. The penis is slender and short, measuring approximately one-quarter of the vaginal length. The penial retractor muscle appears thin and long, inserting on the epiphallus close to the penis. The epiphallus is a long, slender tube, almost the same diameter as the penis. The flagellum is short, extending from the epiphallus and terminating in a slightly enlarged folded coil. The appendix is a long, slender tube, approximately three times longer than the flagellum and roughly as long as the epiphallus. The vas deferens is a slender tube passing from the free oviduct and terminating at the epiphallus-flagellum junction. The internal wall of the penis is corrugated, exhibiting a series of swollen and smooth-surfaced longitudinal penial pilasters that form a fringe around the entire penial wall. The penial verge is very short and conical with a smooth surface.

The vagina is slender, long cylindrical, and approximately four times longer than the penis. The gametolytic duct is a very long cylindrical tube that then tapers abruptly to a slender tube terminally and connects to a globular gametolytic sac. The free oviduct is short; the oviduct is compact, forming lobule alveoli. The internal wall of the vagina possesses corrugated ridges with wide crenelations along its entire length; these ridges become more strongly corrugated closer to the free oviduct opening.

== Distribution ==
This species is endemic to Central Vietnam, Khánh Hòa Province.

== Habitat ==
In and around trees.
