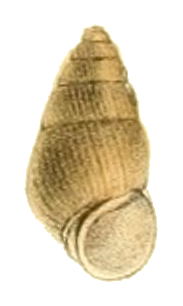
- Drawing by Arnould Locard of an apertural view of the shell of Omphalotropis costulata from its type description (Mousson 1870).

Scientific classification
- Kingdom: Animalia
- Phylum: Mollusca
- Class: Gastropoda
- Subclass: Caenogastropoda
- Order: Littorinimorpha
- Family: Assimineidae
- Genus: Omphalotropis
- Species: O. costulata

Binomial name
- Omphalotropis costulata (Mousson, 1870)

Synonyms
- Realia cotulata Mousson, 1870

= Omphalotropis costulata =

Species of gastropod

Omphalotropis costulata is a species of small salt marsh snail with an operculum, a terrestrial gastropod mollusk, or micromollusk, in the family Assimineidae.

== Distribution ==
The distribution of Omphalotropis costulata includes Fiji.

The type locality is Vanua Balavu.

== See also ==
Omphalotropis costulata Emberton & Pearce, 1999 is a junior homonym for yet (2012) unnamed species Omphalotropis sp. nov. 2.
