= Chalicopoma =

Scientific classification
- Kingdom: Animalia
- Phylum: Mollusca
- Class: Gastropoda
- Subclass: Caenogastropoda
- Order: Littorinimorpha
- Superfamily: Truncatelloidea
- Family: Assimineidae
- Genus: Chalicopoma; Möllendorff, 1894

Type species
- Omphalotropis semicostulata Quadras & Möllendorff, 1894

Genus of gastropods

Chalicopoma is a genus of minute, salt-tolerant snails with an operculum, aquatic gastropod mollusks, or micromollusks, in the subfamily Omphalotropidinae of the family Assimineidae.

== Species ==
- Chalicopoma laevigatum (Quadras & Möllendorff, 1894)
- Chalicopoma semicostulatum (Quadras & Möllendorff, 1894)
