= Quadrasiella =

Scientific classification
- Kingdom: Animalia
- Phylum: Mollusca
- Class: Gastropoda
- Subclass: Caenogastropoda
- Order: Littorinimorpha
- Family: Assimineidae
- Genus: Quadrasiella; Möllendorff, 1894

Genus of gastropods

Quadrasiella is a genus of minute, salt marsh snails with an operculum, aquatic gastropod mollusks, or micromollusks, in the family Assimineidae.

== Species ==
Species within the genus Quadrisella include:

- Quadrasiella clathrata
- Quadrasiella mucronata
