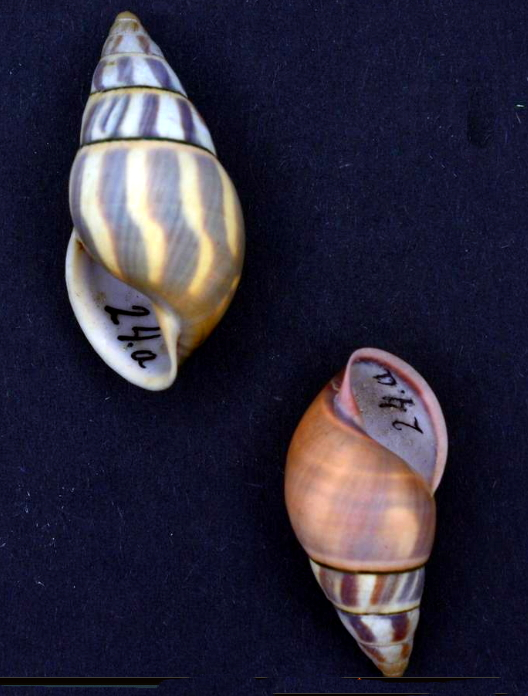
- Shell of Amphidromus rhodostylus (specimen at Naturalis Biodiversity Center)

Scientific classification
- Kingdom: Animalia
- Phylum: Mollusca
- Class: Gastropoda
- Order: Stylommatophora
- Family: Camaenidae
- Genus: Amphidromus
- Species: A. rhodostylus

Binomial name
- Amphidromus rhodostylus Möllendorff, 1901

= Amphidromus rhodostylus =

Species of tree snail

Amphidromus rhodostylus is a species of air-breathing tree snail, an arboreal gastropod mollusk in the family Camaenidae.

== Description ==
The length of this sinistral shell between 38 mm and 45.6 mm, its diameter between 20 mm and 21.4 mm.

(Original description in latin) The shell is sinistral and rimate (with a small opening at the base), presenting an elongate ovate-conical shape and a somewhat solid structure. Its surface appears finely striatulate (with fine grooves) and microscopically spirally decussatulate (with a criss-cross pattern), exhibiting an opaque quality. The typical color is yellow, either uniform or variously painted (see below). The spire is rather elongated with straight sides. Comprising seven whorls, the upper ones are flat, the penultimate appears somewhat convex, and the body whorl is moderately convex, all separated by a brown-lined suture. The aperture lies moderately oblique and has a somewhat ear-shaped form. The peristome is slightly expanded and a little reflected. The columella is straight and somewhat striated, forming a more or less distinct angle with the basal margin and being tinged with pink.

== Distribution ==
This species is endemic to Vietnam.
