= Nakadai =

Nakadai could refer to:

- Miko Nakadai, fictional character in Transformers: Prime
- Izumi Nakadai (Japanese: 中台 泉美), former lineup member of Bon-Bon Blanco
- Tatsuya Nakadai (Japanese: 仲代 達矢; 1932–2025), Japanese actor
- 14105 Nakadai, minor planet
- Lamellidea nakadai, tropical land snail species
