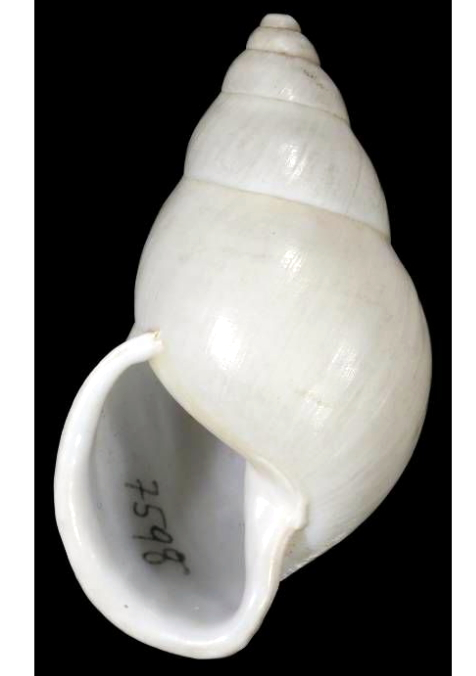
- Shell of Amphidromus roeseleri

Scientific classification
- Kingdom: Animalia
- Phylum: Mollusca
- Class: Gastropoda
- Order: Stylommatophora
- Family: Camaenidae
- Genus: Amphidromus
- Species: A. roeseleri

Binomial name
- Amphidromus roeseleri Möllendorff, 1894

Synonyms
- Amphidromus bilatanensis Bartsch, 1917

= Amphidromus roeseleri =

Species of tree snail

Amphidromus roeseleri is a species of air-breathing tree snail, an arboreal gastropod mollusk in the family Camaenidae.

== Description ==
The length of the shell attains 47 mm, its diameter 27 mm.

(Original description in Latin) The sinistral shell is semi-obtectly perforate (partially covering the opening), presenting an ovate-conical shape and a solid structure. Its surface appears transversely slightly striatulate (with fine grooves) and is decussated (criss-crossed) by very fine and close-set but very distinct spiral lines, giving it a silky, white appearance. The spire is moderately elongate with somewhat convex sides and a blunt apex. The shell contains six moderately convex whorls. The body whorl reaches almost the middle height of the shell. The aperture lies moderately oblique and has a somewhat ear-shaped form. The peristome appears rather broadly expanded, white-lipped, and somewhat reflected. The columella is straight and striated, forming a somewhat distinct angle with the basal margin, and is very callous (thickened), dilated (widened), and revolute (turned back) above, almost covering the perforation.

== Distribution ==
This species is endemic to the Sulu Archipelago, the Philippines.
