= O. gracilis =

O. gracilis may refer to:

- Obruchevichthys gracilis, an extinct tetrapod species from Latvia during the Late Devonian
- Oceanites gracilis, the Elliot's storm-petrel, a seabird species
- Oedipina gracilis, a salamander species found in Costa Rica and Panama
- Omphalotropis gracilis, a gastropod species endemic to Guam
- Ormosia gracilis, a legume species found only in Malaysia
- Oxidus gracilis, the "greenhouse millipede", a widely introduced millipede associated with agricultural areas worldwide
- Oxyopsis gracilis, the South American green mantis, a praying mantis species

== See also ==
- Gracilis (disambiguation)
