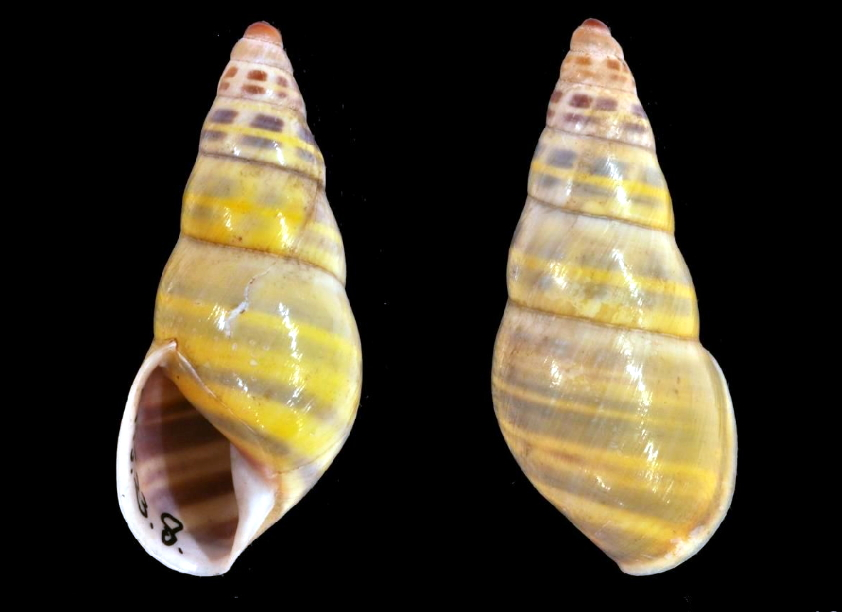
- Shell of Amphidromus columellaris gloriosus (lectotype at the Natural History Museum, London)

Scientific classification
- Kingdom: Animalia
- Phylum: Mollusca
- Class: Gastropoda
- Order: Stylommatophora
- Family: Camaenidae
- Genus: Amphidromus
- Species: A. columellaris

Binomial name
- Amphidromus columellaris Möllendorff, 1892

Synonyms
- Amphidromus (Syndromus) columellaris Möllendorff, 1892 alternative representation

= Amphidromus columellaris =

Species of gastropod

Amphidromus columellaris is a species of air-breathing tree snail, an arboreal gastropod mollusk in the family Camaenidae.

Subspecies

- Amphidromus columellaris columellaris Möllendorff, 1892
- Amphidromus columellaris gloriosus Fulton, 1896

== Description ==
Amphidromus webbi is large, with a shell length ranging from 32.5 mm (1.28 in) and a diameter of 14.1 mm (0.56 in).

(Original description in Latin) The sinistral shell is narrowly perforate, slenderly conico-oblong, somewhat solid and very lightly striate. it is glossy, pale yellow, painted with rather broad, sometimes interrupted green streaks, brownish above, with 3 rosy bands, one at the suture, another below the periphery, the third at the umbilical region, often surrounded by other green, more rarely brown, bands.

The spire is turreted-conical, with a rounded, blackish apex. The shell contains 7 whorls. These are rather flat, slowly increasing, separated by an appressed, white-margined suture, the body whorl slightly ascending anteriorly. The aperture is slightly oblique, narrow and somewhat ear-shaped. The peristome is slightly expanded, white-lipped internally, with the margins joined by a thin, translucent callus. The columella is very spirally twisted and almost revolute towards the perforation.

== Distribution ==
Amphidromus sowerbyi was found on Lesser Sunda Islands and Tanimbar Islands Indonesia.
