= Himeroconcha lamlanensis =

Conservation status
- Data Deficient (IUCN 2.3)

Scientific classification
- Kingdom: Animalia
- Phylum: Mollusca
- Class: Gastropoda
- Order: Stylommatophora
- Family: Charopidae
- Genus: Himeroconcha
- Species: H. lamlanensis

Binomial name
- Himeroconcha lamlanensis Solem, 1982

Species of gastropod

Himeroconcha lamlanensis is a species of gastropod in the family Charopidae that is endemic to Guam.

== See also ==
List of land snails of the Mariana Islands
