= Succinea guamensis =

Conservation status
- Data Deficient (IUCN 2.3)

- Secure (NatureServe)

Scientific classification
- Kingdom: Animalia
- Phylum: Mollusca
- Class: Gastropoda
- Order: Stylommatophora
- Family: Succineidae
- Genus: Succinea
- Species: S. guamensis

Binomial name
- Succinea guamensis Pfeiffer, 1857

Species of gastropod

Succinea guamensis is a species of air-breathing land snail, a terrestrial gastropod mollusk in the family Succineidae, the amber snails.

== Distribution ==
This species is endemic to Guam.

== See also ==
List of land snails of the Mariana Islands
