= Omphalotropis cookei =

Conservation status
- Data Deficient (IUCN 2.3)

Scientific classification
- Kingdom: Animalia
- Phylum: Mollusca
- Class: Gastropoda
- Subclass: Caenogastropoda
- Order: Littorinimorpha
- Family: Assimineidae
- Genus: Omphalotropis
- Species: O. cookei

Binomial name
- Omphalotropis cookei Abbott, 1949

Species of gastropod

Omphalotropis cookei is a species of small salt marsh snail with an operculum, a terrestrial gastropod mollusc, or micromollusc, in the family Assimineidae. This species occurs in Guam and the Northern Mariana Islands.

== See also ==
List of land snails of the Mariana Islands
