= Himeroconcha =

Scientific classification
- Kingdom: Animalia
- Phylum: Mollusca
- Class: Gastropoda
- Order: Stylommatophora
- Family: Charopidae
- Genus: Himeroconcha; Solem, 1983

Genus of gastropods

Himeroconcha is a genus of small air-breathing land snails, terrestrial pulmonate gastropod mollusks in the family Charopidae.

== Species ==
Species within the genus Himeroconcha include:

- Himeroconcha fusca
- Himeroconcha lamlanensis
- Himeroconcha quadrasi
- Himeroconcha rotula
