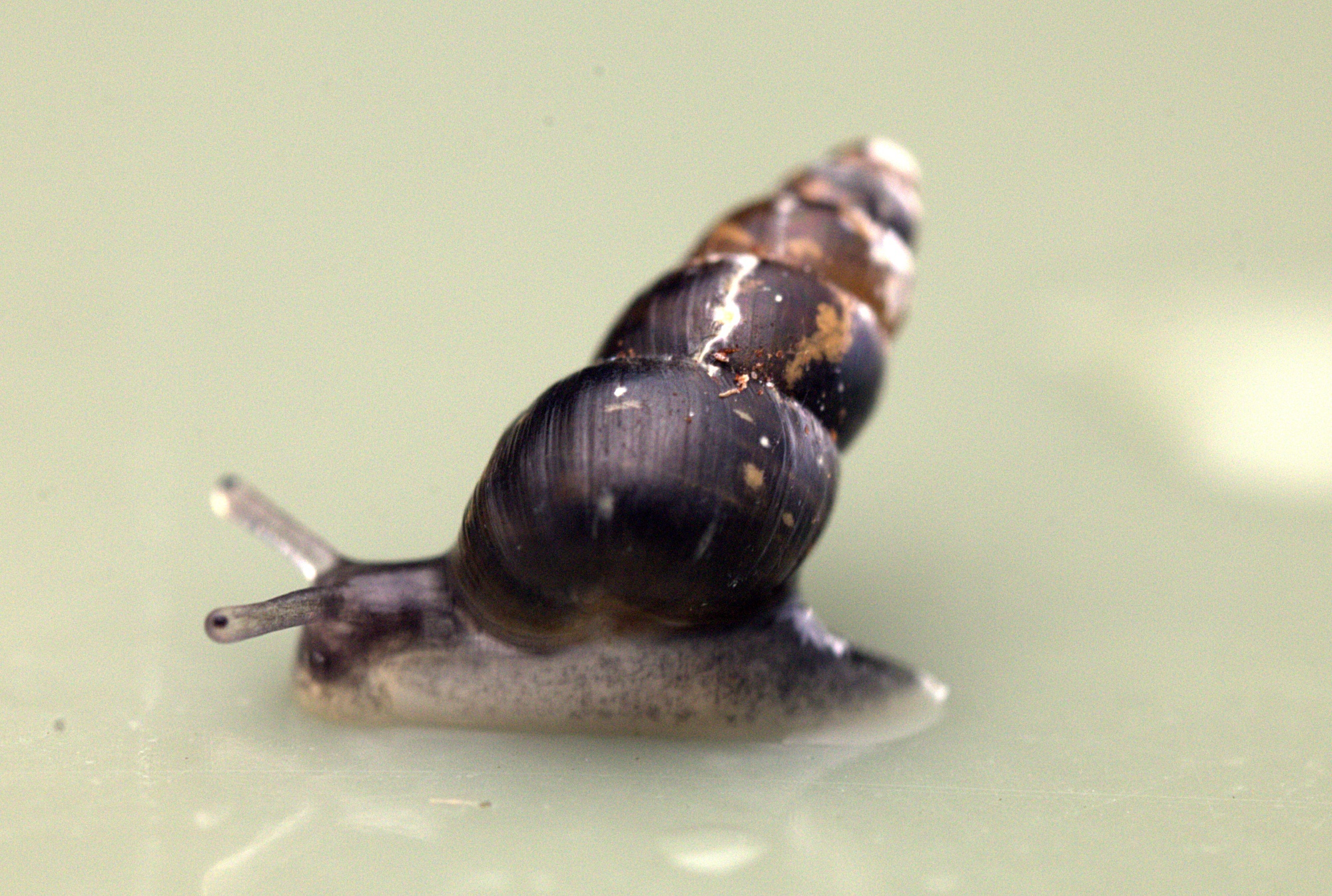
- Lamellidea novoseelandica

Scientific classification
- Kingdom: Animalia
- Phylum: Mollusca
- Class: Gastropoda
- Order: Stylommatophora
- Family: Achatinellidae
- Subfamily: Pacificellinae
- Genus: Lamellidea; Pilsbry, 1910

= Lamellidea =

Genus of gastropods

Lamellidea is a genus of air-breathing tropical land snails, terrestrial pulmonate gastropod mollusks in the family Achatinellidae.

== Species ==
Species within the genus Lamellidea include:

- Lamellidea biplicata
- Lamellidea microstoma
- Lamellidea monodonta
- Lamellidea nakadai
- Lamellidea ogasawarana
- Lamellidea subcylindrica
- Lamellidea novoseelandica
