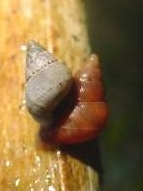
- A pair of live Omphalotropis rubens

Scientific classification
- Domain: Eukaryota
- Kingdom: Animalia
- Phylum: Mollusca
- Class: Gastropoda
- Subclass: Caenogastropoda
- Order: Littorinimorpha
- Superfamily: Truncatelloidea
- Family: Assimineidae
- Genus: Omphalotropis; Pfeiffer, 1851

Type species
- Bulimus hieroglyphicus Potiez & Michaud, 1838

Synonyms
- Hydrocena (Omphalotropis) L. Pfeiffer, 1851; Omphalotropis (Eurytropis) Kobelt & Möllendorff, 1898; Omphalotropis (Omphalotropis) L. Pfeiffer, 1851· accepted, alternate representation; Omphalotropis (Oriella) Thiele, 1927· accepted, alternate representation; Omphalotropis (Stenotropis) Kobelt & Möllendorff, 1898· accepted, alternate representation; Realia (Atropis) Pease, 1871 (Invalid: junior homonym of Atropis Glueckselig, 1851 [Reptilia] and Atropis Kirschbaum, 1867 [Hemiptera]); Realia (Omphalotropis) L. Pfeiffer, 1851 (superseded combination); Realia (Scalinella) Pease, 1868; Scalinella Pease, 1868; Stenotropis Kobelt & Möllendorff, 1898

= Omphalotropis =

Genus of gastropods

Omphalotropis is a genus of minute salt marsh snails with an operculum, terrestrial gastropod mollusks in the subfamily Omphalotropidinae of the family Assimineidae.

== Species ==
Species within the genus Omphalotropis include:

- Omphalotropis abbreviata (Pease, 1865)
- Omphalotropis acrostoma Solem, 1962
- Omphalotropis albescens (L. Pfeiffer, 1855)
- Omphalotropis albolabris Möllendorf, 1897
- Omphalotropis andersoni (W. T. Blanford, 1881)
- Omphalotropis angulata Emberton, 2004
- Omphalotropis antelmei Madge, 1946
- Omphalotropis bassinblancensis Griffiths & Florens, 2004
- Omphalotropis betamponae Emberton, 2004
- Omphalotropis bevohimenae Emberton, 2004
- Omphalotropis bifilaris Mousson, 1865
- Omphalotropis biliratus Mousson, 1865
- Omphalotropis boraborensis Dohrn, 1860
- Omphalotropis brazieri Hedley, 1891
- Omphalotropis brevis Godwin-Austen, 1895
- Omphalotropis bulboides I. Rensch, 1937
- Omphalotropis capdambrae Emberton, 2004
- Omphalotropis carolinensis E. A. Smith, 1892
- Omphalotropis castelli Fischer-Piette, Blanc, C.P., Blanc, F. & Salvat, 1993
- Omphalotropis catenata Möllendorff, 1897
- Omphalotropis ceramensis (L. Pfeiffer, 1862)
- Omphalotropis cheynei (Dohrn & C. Semper, 1862)
- Omphalotropis circumlineata (Mousson, 1870)
- Omphalotropis clavula (Morelet, 1866)
- Omphalotropis columellaris Quadras & Möllendorff, 1893
- Omphalotropis conella Sykes, 1903
- Omphalotropis conjugens Möllendorff, 1893
- Omphalotropis conoideus Mousson, 1865
- Omphalotropis cookei Abbott, 1949
- Omphalotropis coronata Möllendorff, 1887
- Omphalotropis costata (Pease, 1868)
- Omphalotropis costulata (Mousson, 1870)
- Omphalotropis coturnix (Crosse, 1867)
- Omphalotropis crassilabris Möllendorff, 1895
- Omphalotropis decussata (W. T. Blanford, 1881)
- Omphalotropis denselirata Quadras & Möllendorff, 1894
- Omphalotropis desjardinsi Madge, 1939
- Omphalotropis distermina W. H. Benson, 1863
- Omphalotropis dubia (L. Pfeiffer, 1846)
- Omphalotropis ducalis Möllendorff, 1897
- Omphalotropis dupontiana G. Nevill, 1878
- Omphalotropis elegans Quadras & Möllendorff, 1894
- Omphalotropis elongatula Quadras & Möllendorff, 1894
- Omphalotropis erosa (Quoy & Gaimard, 1832)
- Omphalotropis expansilabris (L. Pfeiffer, 1854)
- Omphalotropis fortis Emberton, 2004
- Omphalotropis fragilis (Pease, 1861)
- Omphalotropis galokoae Emberton, 2004
- Omphalotropis globosa (Benson in L. Pfeiffer, 1854)
- Omphalotropis gracilis Quadras & Möllendorff, 1894
- Omphalotropis grandis Thiele, 1928
- Omphalotropis granum (L. Pfeiffer, 1855)
- Omphalotropis griffithsi Emberton, 2004
- Omphalotropis guamensis (L. Pfeiffer, 1857)
- Omphalotropis hercules Ponsonby & Sykes, 1899
- Omphalotropis hieroglyphica (Potiez & Michaud, 1838)
- Omphalotropis howeinsulae Iredale, 1944
- Omphalotropis huaheinensis (L. Pfeiffer, 1855)
- Omphalotropis ilapiryensis Pearce & Paustian, 2013
- Omphalotropis ingens (Mousson, 1870)
- Omphalotropis laticosta Quadras & Möllendorff, 1894
- Omphalotropis latilabris Quadras & Möllendorff, 1894
- Omphalotropis lemniscatus van Benthem Jutting, 1963
- Omphalotropis littorinula Crosse, 1873
- Omphalotropis longula (Mousson, 1870)
- Omphalotropis madagascariensis Germain, 1921
- Omphalotropis major (Morelet, 1866)
- Omphalotropis manomboae Emberton, 2004
- Omphalotropis mapianus Bavay, 1908
- Omphalotropis margarita (L. Pfeiffer, 1851)
- Omphalotropis maxima Madge, 1939
- Omphalotropis moebii E. von Martens, 1880
- Omphalotropis moussoni (Garrett, 1884)
- † Omphalotropis multilirata (L. Pfeiffer, 1854)
- Omphalotropis mutica Möllendorff, 1897
- Omphalotropis nebulosa Pease, 1872
- Omphalotropis oblonga (L. Pfeiffer, 1855)
- Omphalotropis ochthogyra Quadras & Möllendorff, 1894
- Omphalotropis pallida (W. T. Blanford, 1881)
- Omphalotropis papuensis E. A. Smith, 1896
- Omphalotropis picta Quadras & Möllendorf, 1894
- Omphalotropis picturata H. Adams, 1867
- Omphalotropis pilosa Quadras & Möllendorff, 1894
- Omphalotropis plicosa (L. Pfeiffer, 1854)
- Omphalotropis producta (Pease, 1865)
- Omphalotropis protracta Hedley, 1891
- Omphalotropis pulchella Thiele, 1928
- Omphalotropis pupoides (Anton, 1838)
- Omphalotropis quadrasi Möllendorff, 1894
- Omphalotropis quirosi Clench, 1958
- Omphalotropis quittorensis Griffiths & Florens, 2004
- Omphalotropis radiatus (L. Pfeiffer, 1855)
- Omphalotropis rangii (Férussac, 1827)
- Omphalotropis ripae Fischer-Piette, Blanc, F. & Salvat, 1969
- Omphalotropis rosea (A. Gould, 1847)
- Omphalotropis rubens (Quoy & Gaimard, 1832)
- Omphalotropis rubra (Gassies, 1874)
- Omphalotropis scitula (A. Gould, 1847)
- Omphalotropis semperi Möllendorff, 1893
- Omphalotropis setocincta Ancey, 1890
- Omphalotropis sordida (Frauenfeld, 1863)
- Omphalotropis stevanovitchi Griffiths, 2000
- Omphalotropis striatapila Möllendorff, 1897
- Omphalotropis submaritima Quadras & Möllendorff, 1894
- Omphalotropis subsoluta (Mousson, 1870)
- Omphalotropis suturalis Quadras & Möllendorff, 1894
- Omphalotropis taeniata Crosse, 1873
- Omphalotropis tahitensis (Pease, 1861)
- Omphalotropis tantelia Emberton, 2004
- Omphalotropis terebralis (A. Gould, 1847)
- Omphalotropis tumidula Möllendorff, 1897
- Omphalotropis vacoasensis Griffiths & Florens, 2004
- Omphalotropis vallata (A. Gould, 1847)
- Omphalotropis variabilis (Pease, 1865)
- Omphalotropis varians Möllendorff, 1897
- Omphalotropis variegata (Morelet, 1866)
- Omphalotropis viridescens (Pease, 1861)
- Omphalotropis vohimenae Emberton & Pearce, 1999

Taxon inquirendum

- Omphalotropis fischeriana (Gassies, 1863)

Synonyms

- Omphalotropis albocarinata Mousson, 1873: synonym of Duritropis albocarinata (Mousson, 1873) (original combination)
- Omphalotropis costulata Emberton & Pearce, 1999: synonym of Omphalotropis ilapiryensis Pearce & Paustian, 2013 (junior secondary homonym of Omphalotropis costulata (Mousson, 1870))
- Omphalotropis laevigata Quadras & Möllendorff, 1894: synonym of Chalicopoma laevigatum Quadras & Möllendorff, 1894) (original name)
- Omphalotropis semicostulata Quadras & Möllendorff, 1894: synonym of Chalicopoma semicostulatum (Quadras & Möllendorff, 1894)) (original combination)
- Omphalotropis suteri Sykes, 1900: synonym of Telmosena suteri (Sykes, 1900) (original combination)
