= Chalicopoma laevigatum =

Conservation status
- Data Deficient (IUCN 2.3)

Scientific classification
- Kingdom: Animalia
- Phylum: Mollusca
- Class: Gastropoda
- Subclass: Caenogastropoda
- Order: Littorinimorpha
- Family: Assimineidae
- Genus: Chalicopoma
- Species: C. laevigatum

Binomial name
- Chalicopoma laevigatum (uadras & Möllendorff, 1894)

Synonyms
- Omphalotropis laevigata Quadras & Möllendorff, 1894 (original name)

Species of gastropod

Chalicopoma laevigatum is a species of small salt marsh snail with an operculum, a terrestrial gastropod mollusk, or micromollusk, in the family Assimineidae.

This species is endemic to Guam. According to The Encyclopedia of World Problems and Human Potential, Omphalotropis laevigata is an endangered species.

== See also ==
List of land snails of the Mariana Islands
