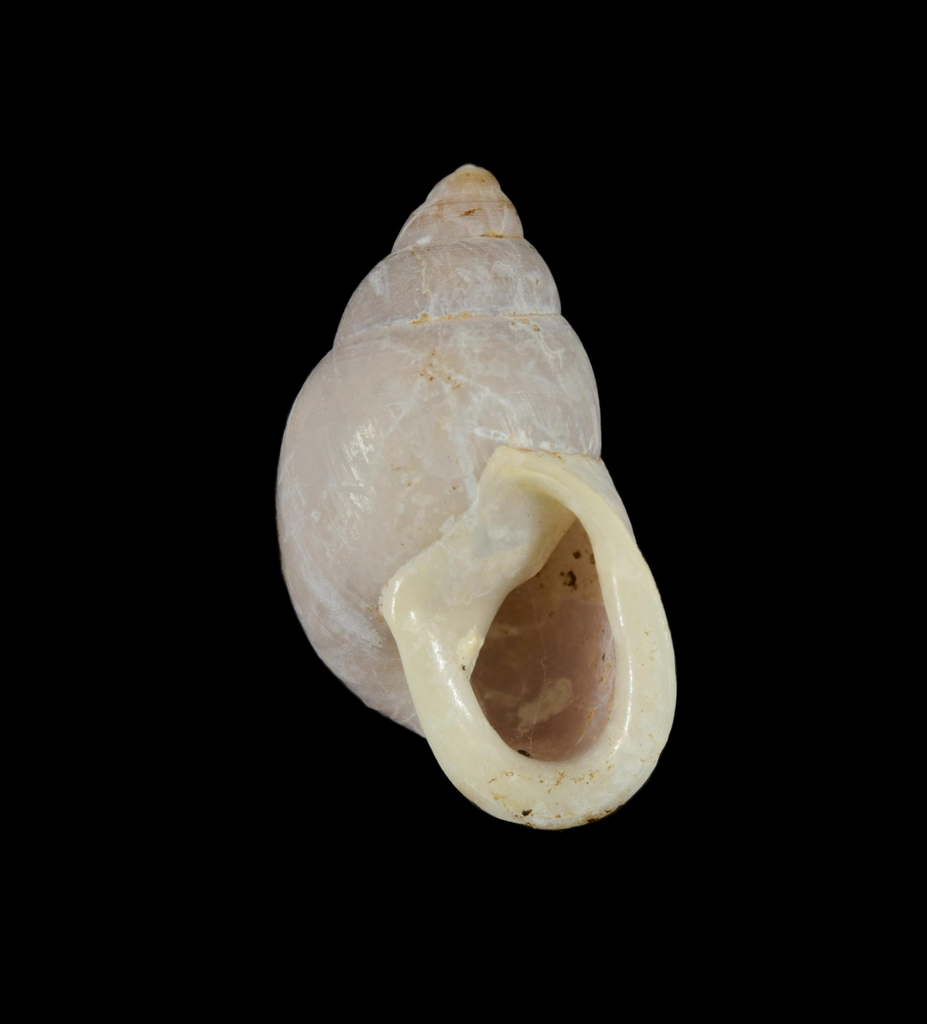

Conservation status
- Extinct (IUCN 2.3)

Scientific classification
- Kingdom: Animalia
- Phylum: Mollusca
- Class: Gastropoda
- Order: Stylommatophora
- Family: Partulidae
- Genus: Partula
- Species: †P. salifana

Binomial name
- †Partula salifana Crampton, 1925

= Mount Alifan partula =

Species of gastropod

The Mount Alifan partula (Partula salifana) was a species of air-breathing tree snail, an arboreal pulmonate gastropod mollusk in the family Partulidae. Its shell was described as being a rich chestnut-brown color.

This species was endemic to southwest Guam, only known to exist on Mount Alifan and two adjacent peaks. It was discovered in 1920 by Henry Crampton in a few acres' range just below the summit of Mount Alifan in high vegetation, especially on Pandanus. He suspected there could be more specimens south of the mountain in the high ground leading to Mount Sasalaguan. In 1925, Crampton first described the species in the literature. He felt it was more similar to the Society Islands partulids than the other Guam species. Crampton understood the name of the mountain to be "Salifan," and thus named the species Partula salifana. He expressed surprise that the snail had not been previously described, despite being large and Guam being a popular site for collecting mollusk specimens for over a century, attributing it to the isolated and remote range of the species. The snail was again recorded after World War II, in 1945 by Robert Tucker Abbott, and in 1946 by Daniel B. Langford. However, a survey of Crampton's sites and surrounding areas in 1989 revealed empty shells but no live snails. A subsequent survey in 2021 again found no live snails.

== See also ==
List of land snails of the Mariana Islands
