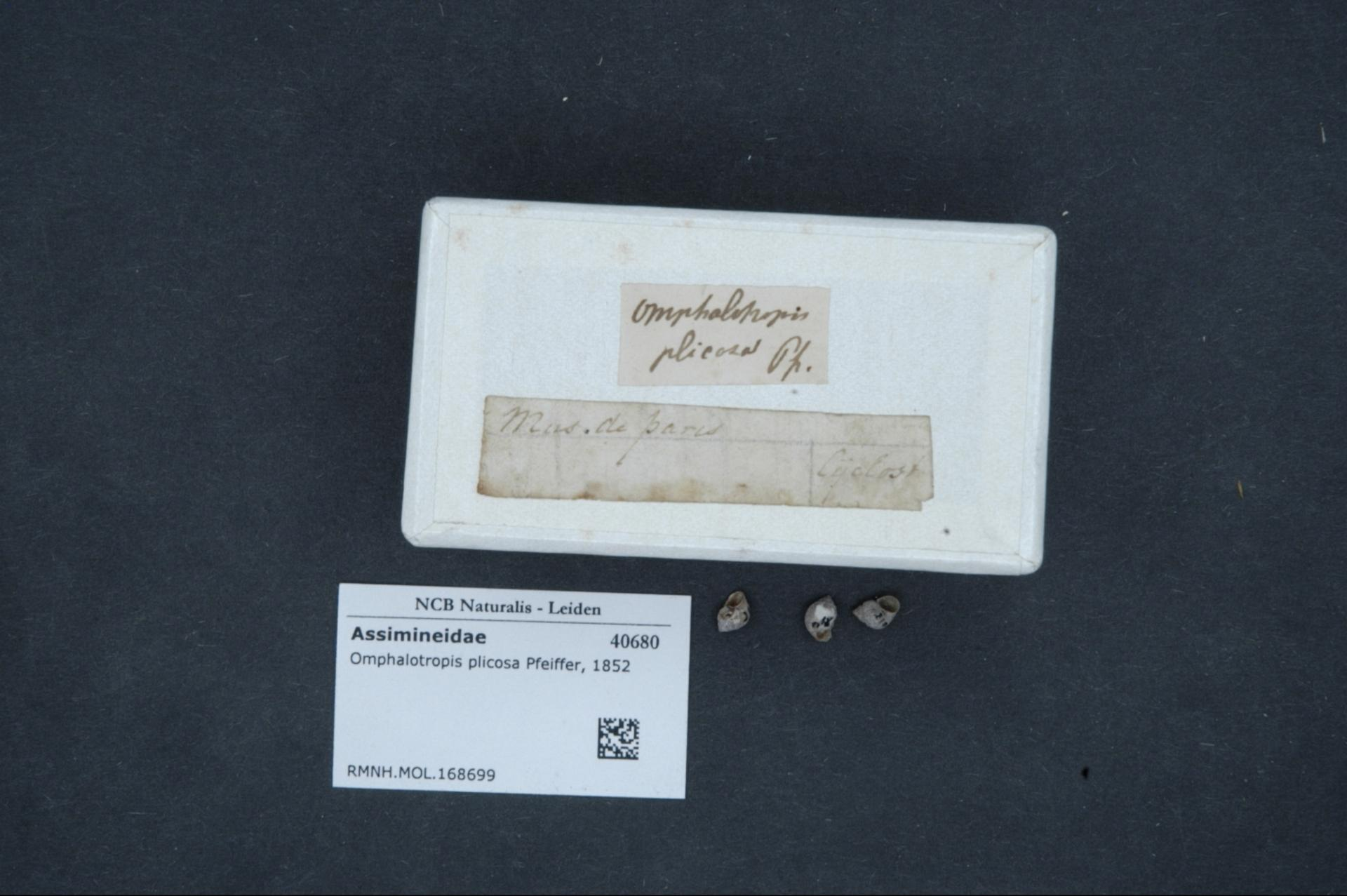

Conservation status
- Critically endangered, possibly extinct (IUCN 2.3)

Scientific classification
- Kingdom: Animalia
- Phylum: Mollusca
- Class: Gastropoda
- Subclass: Caenogastropoda
- Order: Littorinimorpha
- Family: Assimineidae
- Genus: Omphalotropis
- Species: O. plicosa

Binomial name
- Omphalotropis plicosa (Pfeiffer, 1852)

= Omphalotropis plicosa =

Species of gastropod

Omphalotropis plicosa is a species of small salt marsh snail with an operculum, a terrestrial gastropod mollusk, or micromollusk, in the family Assimineidae. This species is endemic to Mauritius.

It was thought to be extinct and it was listed as extinct in the 2006 IUCN Red List of Threatened Species.

Living population have been found in 2002.
