= Mount Alifan =

Mountain in Guam

- Location within Guam

Highest point
- Elevation: 554 ft (169 m)
- Coordinates: 13°22′43″N 144°40′05″E

Geography
- Location: Guam, Micronesia, U.S. territory

Mount Alifan is a peak on the U.S. island territory of Guam. It is located in Agat on the south-west of the island. Alifan is the highest point overseeing Agat Bay and was the site of fierce fighting during the 1944 U.S. invasion of Guam after four years of Japanese occupation. The War in the Pacific National Historical Park owns a "Mt. Alifan Unit" but it is undeveloped.

== Ecology ==
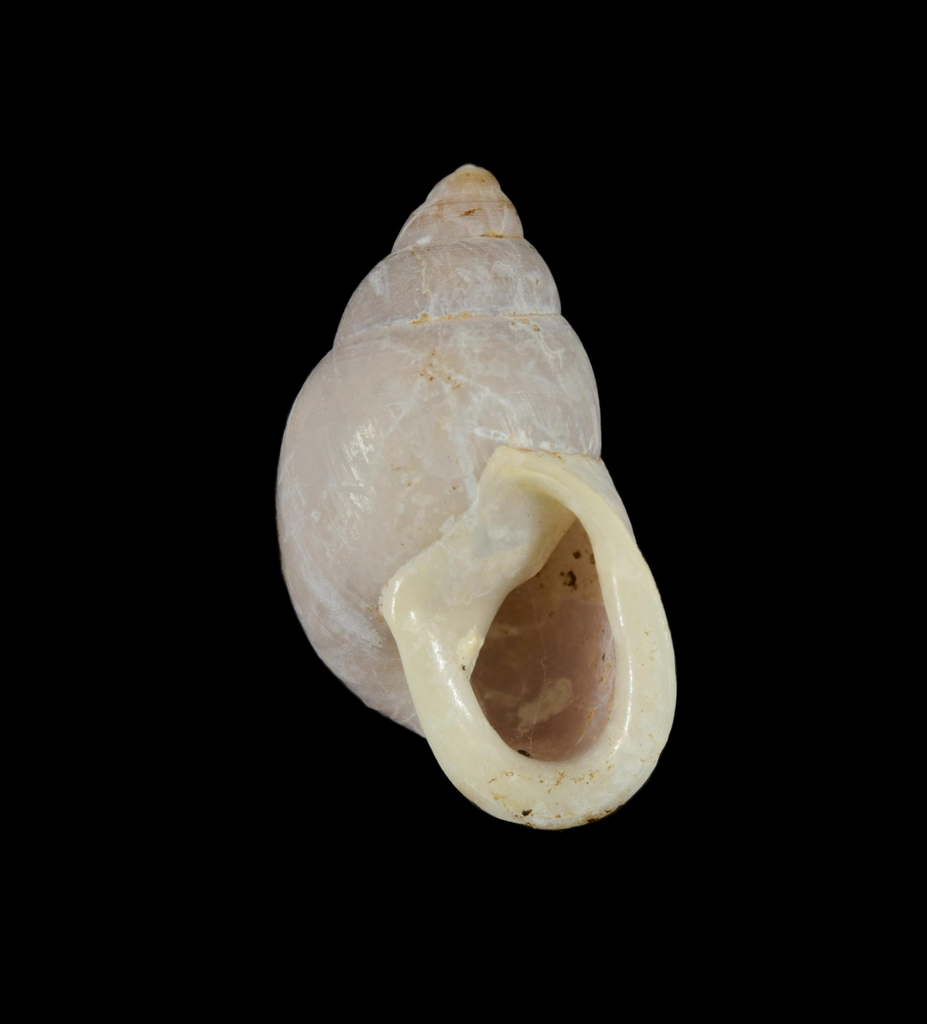
Shell of the extinct Mount Alifan partula (Partula salifana)

Mount Alifan and two adjacent peaks were once home to the Mount Alifan partula snail (Partula salifana), which was described in 1925, but was subsequently declared extinct by 1992.
