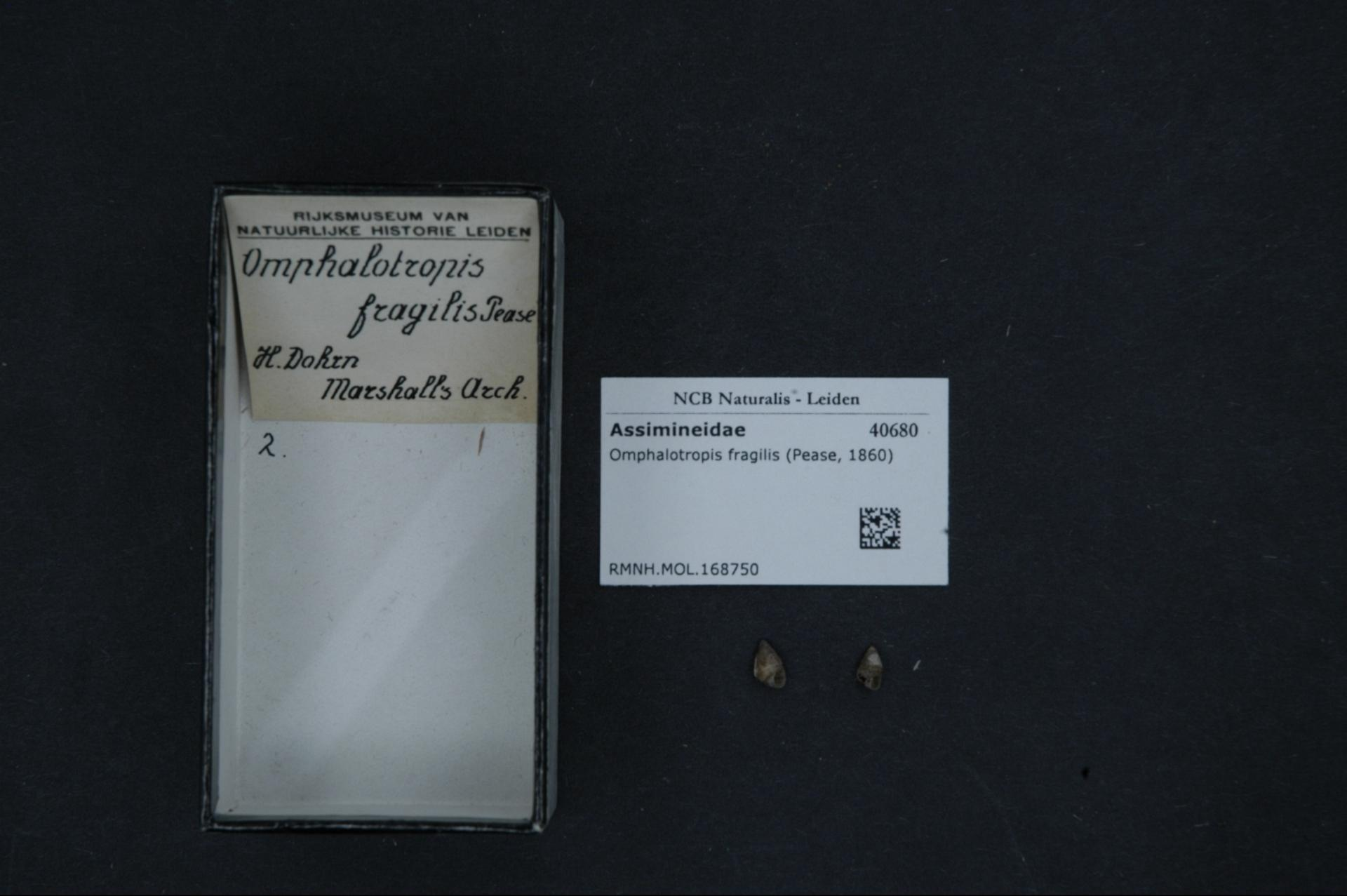
- O. fragilis at Naturalis Biodiversity Center

Conservation status
- Data Deficient (IUCN 2.3)

Scientific classification
- Kingdom: Animalia
- Phylum: Mollusca
- Class: Gastropoda
- Subclass: Caenogastropoda
- Order: Littorinimorpha
- Family: Assimineidae
- Genus: Omphalotropis
- Species: O. fragilis

Binomial name
- Omphalotropis fragilis (Pease, 1861)

= Omphalotropis fragilis =

Species of gastropod

Omphalotropis fragilis is a species of small salt marsh snail with an operculum, a terrestrial gastropod mollusk, or micromollusk, in the family Assimineidae. This species is endemic to Micronesia.
