= Semperdon xyleborus =

Conservation status
- Critically Endangered (IUCN 3.1)

Scientific classification
- Kingdom: Animalia
- Phylum: Mollusca
- Class: Gastropoda
- Order: Stylommatophora
- Family: Charopidae
- Genus: Semperdon
- Species: S. xyleborus

Binomial name
- Semperdon xyleborus Solem, 1983

Species of gastropod

Semperdon xyleborus is a species of small, air-breathing land snails, terrestrial pulmonate gastropod mollusks in the family Charopidae. This species is endemic to Palau.
