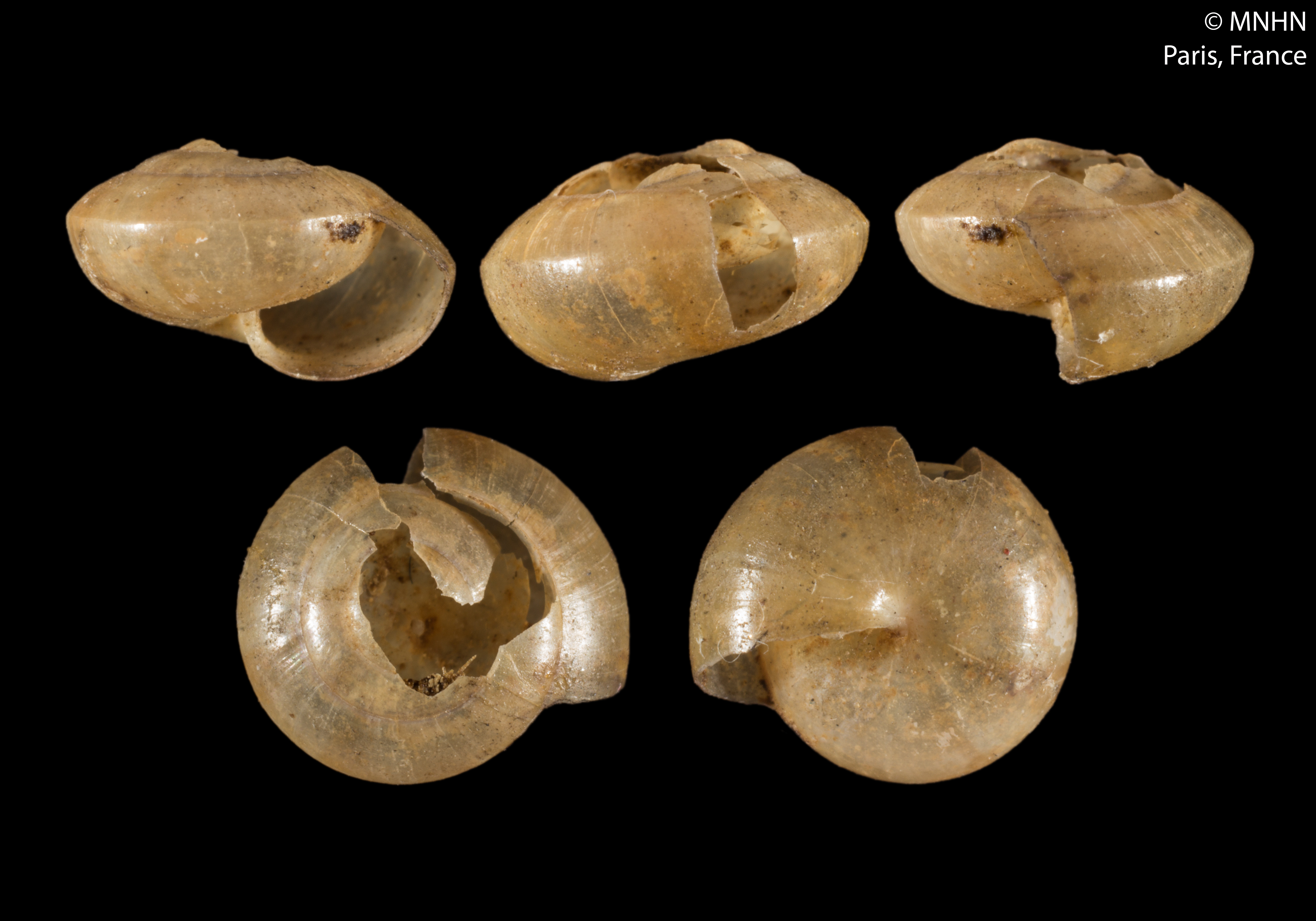
- Shell of Lamprocystis misella (syntype at MNHN, Paris)

Conservation status
- Data Deficient (IUCN 2.3)

Scientific classification
- Domain: Eukaryota
- Kingdom: Animalia
- Phylum: Mollusca
- Class: Gastropoda
- Order: Stylommatophora
- Family: Microcystidae
- Genus: Lamprocystis
- Species: L. misella

Binomial name
- Lamprocystis misella (Förussac, 1821)

Synonyms
- Helix misella Férussac, 1821 (original combination); Helix succinulata Le Guillou, 1842 (junior synonym); Lamprocystis (Guamia) misella (Férussac, 1821)· accepted, alternate representation

= Lamprocystis misella =

Species of gastropod

Lamprocystis misella is a species of small air-breathing land snail, a terrestrial pulmonate gastropod mollusc in the family Euconulidae, the hive snails.

This species is endemic to Guam.

== See also ==
List of land snails of the Mariana Islands
