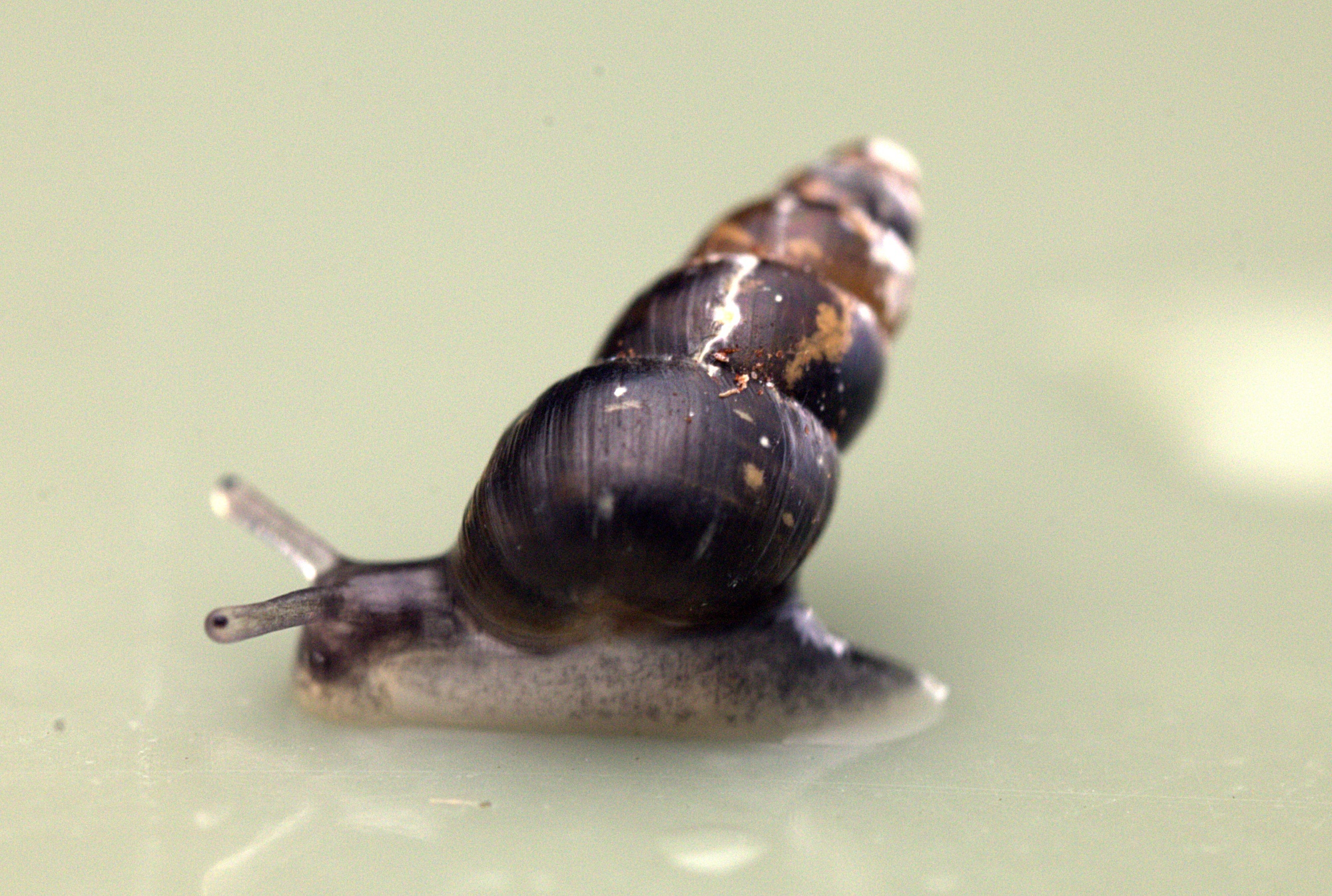

Scientific classification
- Kingdom: Animalia
- Phylum: Mollusca
- Class: Gastropoda
- Order: Stylommatophora
- Family: Achatinellidae
- Genus: Lamellidea
- Species: L. novoseelandica

Binomial name
- Lamellidea novoseelandica (Küster, 1852)

Synonyms
- List: Bulimus jacksonensis J. C. Cox, 1864; Tornatellina duplicilamellata Preston, 1913; Tornatellina inconspicua Brazier, 1872; Tornatellina neozelanica F. W. Hutton, 1884; Tornatellina norfolkensis Preston, 1913; Tornatellina norfolkensis moohuensis Preston, 1913; Tornatellina norfolkensis nepeanensis Preston, 1913; Tornatellina novoseelandica Küster, 1852; Tornatellinops inconspicua (Brazier, 1872); Tornatellinops jacksonensis (J. C. Cox, 1864); Tornatellinops novoseelandicus (Küster, 1852); Tornelasmias capricorni Iredale, 1944

= Lamellidea novoseelandica =

Extinct species of gastropod

Lamellidea novoseelandica is a species of minute air-breathing land snail, a terrestrial pulmonate gastropod mollusk or micromollusk in the family Achatinellidae. This species is widespread in New Zealand and eastern Australia.

The name Tornelasmias capricorni, listed as an extinct species by IUCN, was deemed to be a synonym of this species in a 2023 review.
