= Lamellidea biplicata =

Conservation status
- Vulnerable (IUCN 2.3)

Scientific classification
- Kingdom: Animalia
- Phylum: Mollusca
- Class: Gastropoda
- Order: Stylommatophora
- Family: Achatinellidae
- Genus: Lamellidea
- Species: L. biplicata

Binomial name
- Lamellidea biplicata (Pilsbry, 1902)

Species of gastropod

Lamellidea biplicata is a species of air-breathing tropical land snails, terrestrial pulmonate gastropod mollusks in the family Achatinellidae. This species is endemic to Japan.
