= Ladronellum =

Scientific classification
- Domain: Eukaryota
- Kingdom: Animalia
- Phylum: Mollusca
- Class: Gastropoda
- Order: Stylommatophora
- Family: Charopidae
- Genus: Ladronellum

Genus of gastropods

Ladronellum is a genus of small air-breathing land snails, terrestrial pulmonate gastropod mollusks in the family Charopidae. This genus is only known to be observed in Guam.

== Species ==
Species within the genus Ladronellum include:

- Ladronellum mariannarum
