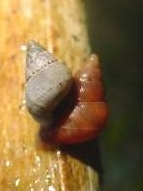
- Two live individuals of Omphalotropis rubens (possibly a mating pair)

Scientific classification
- Kingdom: Animalia
- Phylum: Mollusca
- Class: Gastropoda
- Subclass: Caenogastropoda
- Order: Littorinimorpha
- Family: Assimineidae
- Genus: Omphalotropis
- Species: O. rubens

Binomial name
- Omphalotropis rubens (Quoy & Gaimard, 1832)

Synonyms
- Cyclostoma (Hydrocoena) moreleti Deshayes, 1863 (junior synonym); Cyclostoma (Hydrocoena) rubens (Quoy & Gaimard, 1832); Cyclostoma aurantiacum Deshayes, 1832 (original combination); Cyclostoma rubens Quoy & Gaimard, 1832 (original combination); Hydrocena belangeri L. Pfeiffer, 1847 (unnecessary nom. nov. pro Cyclostoma aurantiacum, by Pfeiffer treated as a secondary homonym of Annularia aurantiaca Schumacher, 1817); Omphalotropis aurantiaca (Deshayes, 1832) (junior synonym); Omphalotropis moreleti (Deshayes, 1863) (junior synonym)

= Omphalotropis rubens =

Species of gastropod

Omphalotropis rubens is a species of small, salt marsh snail with an operculum, aquatic gastropod mollusk, or micromollusk, a terrestrial gastropod mollusk in the family Assimineidae.

== Distribution ==
This terrestrial species is found in Réunion and Mauritius.
