= Omphalotropis vohimenae =

Conservation status
- Data Deficient (IUCN 2.3)

Scientific classification
- Kingdom: Animalia
- Phylum: Mollusca
- Class: Gastropoda
- Subclass: Caenogastropoda
- Order: Littorinimorpha
- Family: Assimineidae
- Genus: Omphalotropis
- Species: O. vohimenae

Binomial name
- Omphalotropis vohimenae Emberton & Pearce, 1999.

Species of gastropod

Omphalotropis vohimenae is a species of small salt marsh snail with an operculum, a terrestrial gastropod mollusk, or micromollusk, in the family Assimineidae.

This species is endemic to Madagascar. Its natural habitat is subtropical or tropical dry forests.
