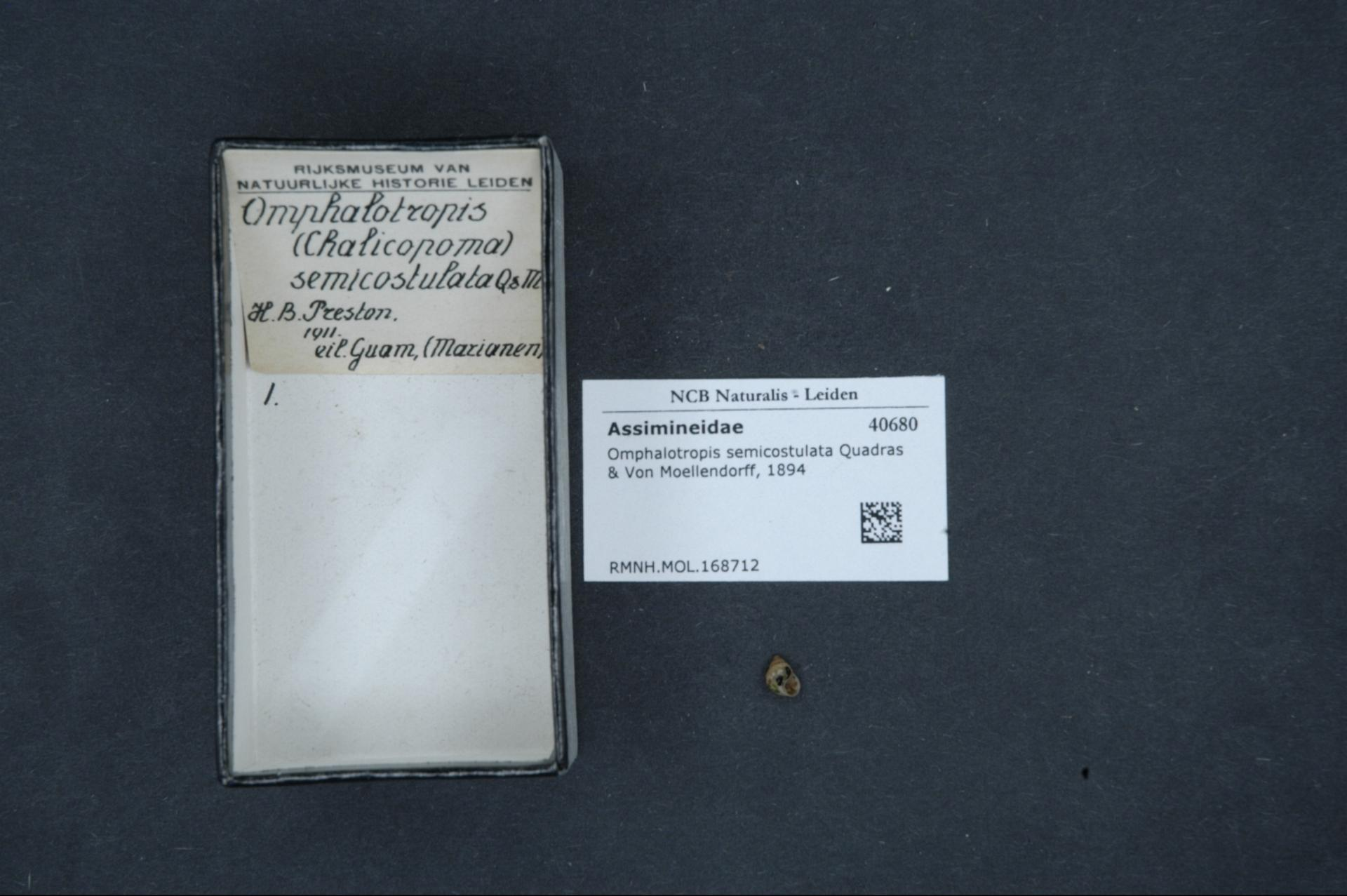
- Specimen at Naturalis Biodiversity Center

Conservation status
- Data Deficient (IUCN 2.3)

Scientific classification
- Kingdom: Animalia
- Phylum: Mollusca
- Class: Gastropoda
- Subclass: Caenogastropoda
- Order: Littorinimorpha
- Family: Assimineidae
- Genus: Chalicopoma
- Species: C. semicostulatum

Binomial name
- Chalicopoma semicostulatum (Quadras & Möllendorff, 1894)

Synonyms
- Omphalotropis (Chalicopoma) Möllendorff, 1894 (original rank); Omphalotropis (Chalicopoma) semicostulata Quadras & Möllendorff, 1894 (original name); Omphalotropis semicostata [Orth. error] Quandras & Möllendorff, 1894

= Chalicopoma semicostulatum =

Species of gastropod

Chalicopoma semicostulatum is a species of small, salt marsh snail with an operculum, aquatic gastropod mollusks, or micromollusks, in the family Assimineidae.

This species is endemic to Guam.

== See also ==
List of land snails of the Mariana Islands
