= Lamprocystis hornbosteli =

Conservation status
- Data Deficient (IUCN 2.3)

Scientific classification
- Kingdom: Animalia
- Phylum: Mollusca
- Class: Gastropoda
- Order: Stylommatophora
- Family: Microcystidae
- Genus: Lamprocystis
- Species: L. hornbosteli

Binomial name
- Lamprocystis hornbosteli H. B. Baker 1938

Species of gastropod

Lamprocystis hornbosteli is a species of small air-breathing land snail, a terrestrial pulmonate gastropod mollusc in the family Euconulidae, the hive snails.

This species is endemic to Northern Mariana Islands.

== See also ==
List of land snails of the Mariana Islands
