= Omphalotropis hieroglyphica =

Conservation status
- Endangered (IUCN 2.3)

Scientific classification
- Kingdom: Animalia
- Phylum: Mollusca
- Class: Gastropoda
- Subclass: Caenogastropoda
- Order: Littorinimorpha
- Family: Assimineidae
- Genus: Omphalotropis
- Species: O. hieroglyphica

Binomial name
- Omphalotropis hieroglyphica Potiez & Michaud, 1838

Species of gastropod

Omphalotropis hieroglyphica is a species of small salt marsh snail with an operculum, a terrestrial gastropod mollusk, or micromollusk, in the family Assimineidae. This species is endemic to Mauritius.
