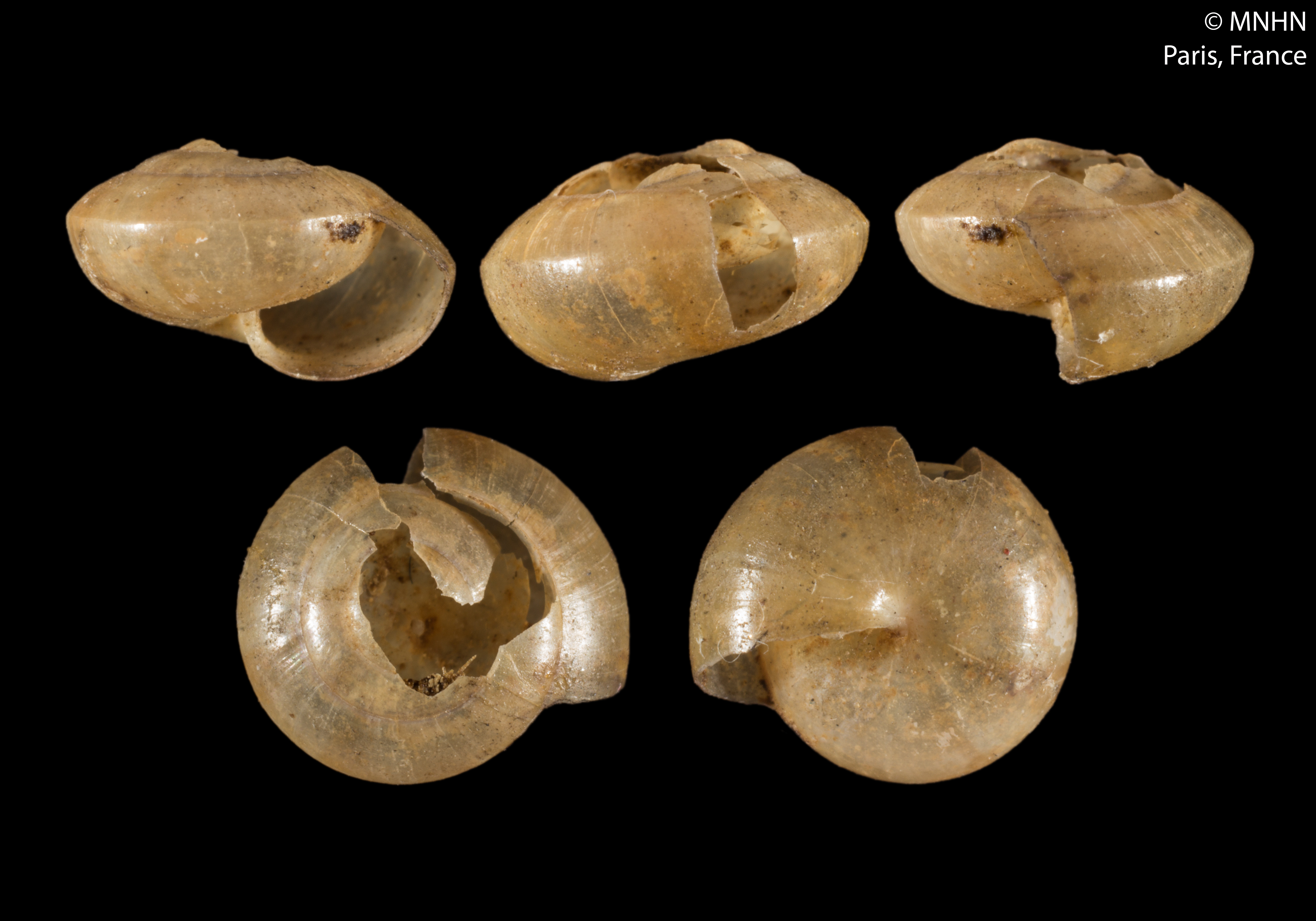
- Shell of Lamprocystis misella (syntype at MNHN, Paris)

Scientific classification
- Kingdom: Animalia
- Phylum: Mollusca
- Class: Gastropoda
- Order: Stylommatophora
- Infraorder: Limacoidei
- Superfamily: Trochomorphoidea
- Family: Microcystidae
- Genus: Lamprocystis; Pfeffer, 1883

Type species
- Nanina excrescens Mousson, 1870

Synonyms
- Lamprocystis (Avarua) H. B. Baker, 1938· accepted, alternate representation; Lamprocystis (Guamia) H.B. Baker, 1938· accepted, alternate representation; Lamprocystis (Kerakystis) H.B. Baker, 1938· accepted, alternate representation; Lamprocystis (Lamprocystis) Pfeffer, 1883· accepted, alternate representation; Lamprocystis (Manureva) H.B. Baker, 1938· accepted, alternate representation; Lamprocystis (Moala) H.B. Baker, 1938· accepted, alternate representation; Lamprocystis (Naiaua) H.B. Baker, 1938 accepted, alternate representation; Lamprocystis (Raiatea) H.B. Baker, 1938· accepted, alternate representation; Lamprocystis (Tongacystis) H.B. Baker, 1938· accepted, alternate representation; Nanina (Lamprocystis) Pfeffer, 1883 (superseded combination); Nanina (Lamprocystis) Pfeffer, 1883 · unaccepted > superseded rank

= Lamprocystis =

Genus of gastropods

Lamprocystis is a genus of small air-breathing land snails, terrestrial pulmonate gastropod mollusks in family Microcystidae, the hive snails.

== Species ==
Species within the genus Lamprocystis include:

- Lamprocystis alba (Möllendorff, 1887)
- Lamprocystis arctispira Quadras & Möllendorff, 1894
- Lamprocystis badia Möllendorff, 1890
- Lamprocystis batudulangensis B. Rensch, 1930
- Lamprocystis calamianica Quadras & Möllendorff, 1894
- Lamprocystis candida Quadras & Möllendorff, 1894
- Lamprocystis castaneovitrina B. Rensch, 1932
- Lamprocystis chlororaphe E. A. Smith, 1893
- Lamprocystis consueta (E. A. Smith, 1896)
- Lamprocystis conulina Möllendorff, 1891
- Lamprocystis crystallina (Möllendorff, 1887)
- Lamprocystis ctenodonta B. Rensch, 1935
- Lamprocystis cursor P. Sarasin & F. Sarasin, 1899
- Lamprocystis denticulata Quadras & Möllendorff, 1894
- Lamprocystis discoidea Quadras & Möllendorff, 1894
- Lamprocystis ensifera (Mousson, 1869)
- Lamprocystis excrescens (Mousson, 1870)
- Lamprocystis fastigata (Gude, 1917)
- Lamprocystis gedeana Möllendorff, 1897
- Lamprocystis gemmula (Möllendorff, 1887)
- Lamprocystis glaberrima (C. Semper, 1870)
- Lamprocystis globosa H. B. Baker, 1938
- Lamprocystis globulus (Möllendorff, 1887)
- Lamprocystis goniogyra Möllendorff, 1888
- Lamprocystis guttula (L. Pfeiffer, 1853)
- Lamprocystis hahajimana (Pilsbry, 1902)
- Lamprocystis hornbosteli H. B. Baker, 1938
- Lamprocystis imitatrix Möllendorff, 1890
- Lamprocystis kioaensis (Garrett, 1873)
- Lamprocystis laciniata B. Rensch, 1930
- Lamprocystis lactea (C. Semper, 1870)
- Lamprocystis laddi H. B. Baker, 1938
- Lamprocystis leucochondrium Möllendorff, 1896
- Lamprocystis leucoclimax Möllendorff, 1895
- Lamprocystis leucodiscus Möllendorff, 1894
- Lamprocystis leucosphaerion Quadras & Möllendorff, 1893
- Lamprocystis lucidella (L. Pfeiffer, 1846)
- Lamprocystis mabelae (E. A. Smith, 1888)
- Lamprocystis macassarica P. Sarasin & F. Sarasin, 1899
- Lamprocystis malayana Möllendorff, 1891
- Lamprocystis masbatica Quadras & Möllendorff, 1895
- Lamprocystis mendanae Solem, 1959
- Lamprocystis mildredae (E. A. Smith, 1888)
- Lamprocystis mindoroana Quadras & Möllendorff, 1894
- Lamprocystis misella (Férussac, 1821)
- Lamprocystis mitangensis P. Sarasin & F. Sarasin, 1899
- Lamprocystis moalana H. B. Baker, 1938
- Lamprocystis montana Quadras & Möllendorff, 1895
- Lamprocystis musicola P. Sarasin & F. Sarasin, 1899
- Lamprocystis myops (Dohrn & C. Semper, 1862)
- Lamprocystis nodulata (Mousson, 1870)
- Lamprocystis normani (E. A. Smith, 1888)
- Lamprocystis oneataensis (Mousson, 1870)
- Lamprocystis ongeae H. B. Baker, 1938
- Lamprocystis perglabra (E. A. Smith, 1898)
- Lamprocystis perpolita (Mousson, 1869)
- Lamprocystis planorbis Möllendorff, 1894
- Lamprocystis punctifera (Garrett, 1879)
- Lamprocystis purpureofusca Quadras & Möllendorff, 1895
- Lamprocystis rurutuana H. B. Baker, 1938
- Lamprocystis semiglobulus (Möllendorff, 1887)
- Lamprocystis simillima (Pease, 1864)
- Lamprocystis solida (Mousson, 1871)
- Lamprocystis soputensis P. Sarasin & F. Sarasin, 1899
- Lamprocystis subglobulus Möllendorff, 1891
- Lamprocystis timorensis B. Rensch, 1935
- Lamprocystis unisulcata (Mousson, 1865)
- Lamprocystis upolensis (Mousson, 1865)
- Lamprocystis vavauensis (Baird, 1873)
- Lamprocystis venosa (Pease, 1866)
- Lamprocystis vestalis van Benthem Jutting, 1964
- Lamprocystis vitrinella (Beck, 1838)
- Lamprocystis vitrinoconulus B. Rensch, 1935
- Lamprocystis waingapuensis B. Rensch, 1930

Species brought into synonymy

- Lamprocystis annamitica Möllendorff, 1898: synonym of Microcystina annamitica (Möllendorff, 1898) (original combination)
- Lamprocystis appendiculata Möllendorff, 1893: synonym of Microcystina appendiculata (Möllendorff, 1893) (superseded combination)
- Lamprocystis balabacensis E. A. Smith, 1895: synonym of Lamprocystis discoidea Quadras & Möllendorff, 1894 (junior synonym)
- Lamprocystis circumlineata Möllendorff, 1897: synonym of Microcystina circumlineata (Möllendorff, 1897) (original combination)
- Lamprocystis exigua Möllendorff, 1897: synonym of Microcystina exigua (Möllendorff, 1897) (original combination)
- Lamprocystis frivola (Pease, 1866): synonym of Kusaiea frivola (Pease, 1866) (superseded combination)
- Lamprocystis fruhstorferi Möllendorff, 1897: synonym of Microcystina fruhstorferi (Möllendorff, 1897) (original combination)
- Lamprocystis fulgida Godwin-Austen, 1907: synonym of Ovachlamys fulgens (Gude, 1900) (junior synonym)
- Lamprocystis infans (L. Pfeiffer, 1854): synonym of Macrochlamys infans (Reeve, 1854) synonym of Tanychlamys infans (Reeve, 1854) (unaccepted combination)
- Lamprocystis lissa E.A. Smith, 1894: synonym of Westracystis lissa (E. A. Smith, 1894) (original combination)
- Lamprocystis nana Möllendorff, 1897: synonym of Microcystina nana (Möllendorff, 1897) (original combination)
- Lamprocystis palaensis (C. Semper, 1870): synonym of Kororia palaensis (C. Semper, 1870) (superseded combination)
- Lamprocystis pseudosuccinea Möllendorff, 1893: synonym of Kororia pseudosuccinea (Möllendorff, 1893)
- Lamprocystis radiatula Möllendorff, 1897: synonym of Helicarion radiatulus (Möllendorff, 1897) (original combination)
- Lamprocystis sinica (Möllendorff, 1885): synonym of Microcystina sinica Möllendorff, 1885
- Lamprocystis spadix Schmacker & Boettger, 1891: synonym of Chalepotaxis spadix (Schmacker & Boettger, 1891) (original combination)
- Lamprocystis st.-johni (Godwin-Austen, 1891): synonym of Macrochlamys sanctijohni (Godwin-Austen, 1891) (superseded combination)
- Lamprocystis subcicercula (Garrett, 1881): synonym of Lamprocystis venosa subcicerula (Garrett, 1881)
- Lamprocystis subcrystallina Möllendorff, 1893: synonym of Lamprocystis crystallina (Möllendorff, 1887) (junior synonym)
- Lamprocystis subglobosa Möllendorff, 1897: synonym of Microcystina subglobosa (Möllendorff, 1897) (original combination)
- Lamprocystis succinea (Pfeiffer, 1845): synonym of Lamprocystis pseudosuccinea Möllendorff, 1893: synonym of Kororia pseudosuccinea (Möllendorff, 1893) (misidentification)
- Lamprocystis vitreiformis Möllendorff, 1897: synonym of Microcystina vitreiformis (Möllendorff, 1897) (original combination)
