= Semperdon rotanus =

Conservation status
- Data Deficient (IUCN 2.3)

Scientific classification
- Kingdom: Animalia
- Phylum: Mollusca
- Class: Gastropoda
- Order: Stylommatophora
- Family: Charopidae
- Genus: Semperdon
- Species: S. rotanus

Binomial name
- Semperdon rotanus Solem, 1983

Species of gastropod

Semperdon rotanus is a species of small, air-breathing land snails, terrestrial pulmonate gastropod mollusks in the family Charopidae. This species is found in Guam and Northern Mariana Islands.

== See also ==
List of land snails of the Mariana Islands
