= Omphalotropis sp. nov. 2 =

Conservation status
- Data Deficient (IUCN 3.1)

Scientific classification
- Kingdom: Animalia
- Phylum: Mollusca
- Class: Gastropoda
- Subclass: Caenogastropoda
- Order: Littorinimorpha
- Family: Assimineidae
- Genus: Omphalotropis
- Species: O. sp. nov. 2

Binomial name
- Omphalotropis sp. nov. 2

Synonyms
- Omphalotropis costulata Emberton & Pearce, 1999

Species of gastropod

"Omphalotropis sp. nov. 2" is the name used by the IUCN for an undescribed species of minute salt marsh snail with an operculum, a terrestrial gastropod mollusk, or micromollusk, in the family Assimineidae.

This species is endemic to Madagascar. Its natural habitat is subtropical or tropical dry forests. It is threatened by habitat loss.

The species was originally named O. costulata, but this name was previously used for another species and is therefore invalid. As of 2012, the species lacks a proper binomial name.
