= Semperdon uncatus =

Conservation status
- Endangered (IUCN 3.1)

Scientific classification
- Kingdom: Animalia
- Phylum: Mollusca
- Class: Gastropoda
- Order: Stylommatophora
- Family: Charopidae
- Genus: Semperdon
- Species: S. uncatus

Binomial name
- Semperdon uncatus Solem, 1982

Species of gastropod

Semperdon uncatus is a species of small, air-breathing land snails, terrestrial pulmonate gastropod mollusks in the family Charopidae. This species is endemic to Palau.
