= Lamellidea nakadai =

Conservation status
- Extinct (IUCN 2.3)

Scientific classification
- Kingdom: Animalia
- Phylum: Mollusca
- Class: Gastropoda
- Order: Stylommatophora
- Family: Achatinellidae
- Genus: Lamellidea
- Species: †L. nakadai

Binomial name
- †Lamellidea nakadai (Pilsbry & C. M. Cooke, 1915)

Species of gastropod

†Lamellidea nakadai was a species of air-breathing tropical land snails, terrestrial pulmonate gastropod mollusks in the family Achatinellidae. This species was endemic to Japan; it is now extinct.
