= Otto Franz von Möllendorff =

German zoologist and diplomat (1848–1903)

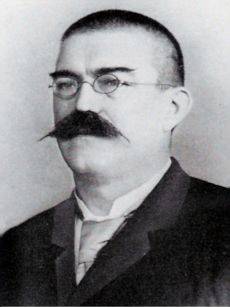
Otto Franz von Möllendorff

Otto Franz von Möllendorff (24 December 1848 – 17 August 1903) was a German diplomat, traveller, and a naturalist who collected specimens during his travels. He took a special interest in molluscs. He was a brother of the diplomat Paul Georg von Möllendorff.

== Life and work ==
Möllendorff was born in Hoyerswerda to economist Georg (1811–61) and Emma née Meyer (1817–72). He studied chemistry and zoology at the University of Halle and became a private tutor for the daughter of Consul General Blau in Sarajevo whom he later married. While in Bosnia, he began to study the zoology of the region and wrote a Fauna von Bosnia as his doctoral dissertation in 1872. His brother Paul Georg took up a diplomatic position in China and under the influence of his father in law, he too became a diplomat. He studied Chinese and worked as an interpreter in Canton and Hongkong before moving to Manila in 1886. During his travels he collected shells. Poor health forced him to transfer to Lithuania in 1896 and he moved to Frankfurt am Main in 1901. He gave lectures on consular matters and in his spare time he worked on the mollusc specimens at the Senckenberg Museum to assist Wilhelm Kobelt.

Möllendorff was a keen malacologist. In 1894, Jose Rizal sent (from Dapitan) to Möllendorff (who was in Manila at that time) specimens of large sea snails known as tun shells together with some specimens of a species of small freshwater snails stored in glass vials. The species of small snails was later named Oncomelania quadrasi by Möllendorff in 1895 in honour of Don José Florencio Quadras, a Spanish malacologist who was also based in Manila at that time. He examined the specimens from Southeast Asia and produced an inventory of land molluscs of the Philippines in 1898. He published over 128 publications and described 102 new genera and 1988 species. A species of rat snake, Elaphe moellendorffi, is named in his honor.

== Species named by Möllendorff ==
See Category:Taxa named by Otto Franz von Möllendorff

== Bibliography ==
- Reisen im Archipel der Philippinen.
- WoRMS: list of marine species named by Otto Franz von Möllendorff.
