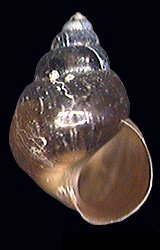
- Apertural view of a shell of Assiminea grayana

Scientific classification
- Kingdom: Animalia
- Phylum: Mollusca
- Class: Gastropoda
- Subclass: Caenogastropoda
- Order: Littorinimorpha
- Superfamily: Truncatelloidea
- Family: Assimineidae
- Genus: Assiminea; Fleming, 1828

Type species
- Assiminea grayiana J. Fleming, 1828

Synonyms
- Assemania Knight, 1900 (unjustified emendation); Assiminea (Assiminea) J. Fleming, 1828; Assiminia J. Fleming, 1828 (alternative original spelling [used in the index p. 557]); Bythinia (Assiminea) J. Fleming, 1828; Syncera Gray 1821 (nomen nudum)

= Assiminea =

Genus of gastropods

Assiminea is a genus of minute, salt-tolerant snails with an operculum, aquatic gastropod mollusks, or micromollusks, in the family Assimineidae.

== Distribution and habitat ==
These snails can be found worldwide. They live usually in brackish water between tide-marks on the mud of estuaries and salt marshes of tropical and temperate regions, at beaches, in water and at land. But species are to be found both in perfectly salt and in perfectly fresh water.

== Description ==
These are very small to medium large snails, between 2 and 13 mm. Some adults do not exceed a size of 3 mm. Some related genera, such as Paludinella, are so remarkably similar in shell form that they are often confused.

The shape of the thin shells is somewhat ovately conical. The margin of the aperture is simple. The operculum is in most cases horny. The eyes are at the end of short, stout stalks. They feed on vegetable detritus and small algae. They lay their eggs in the mud, and hatch as free-swimming larvae.

== Species ==
According to the World Register of Marine Species, the following species with valid names are included within the genus Assiminea :

- † Assiminea aldra Dall, 1915
- Assiminea alveolata Viader, 1939
- Assiminea aurifera Preston, 1912
- Assiminea avilai van Aartsen, 2008
- Assiminea blanfordi Abbott, 1958
- Assiminea boettgeri Abbott, 1958
- Assiminea cienegensis Hershler, H.-P. Liu & Lang, 2007
- Assiminea cincta A. Adams, 1861 (taxon inquirendum)
- Assiminea compacta (Carpenter, 1864)
- Assiminea cornea (Leith, 1853) (taxon inquirendum)
- † Assiminea costata D.-M. Zeng & J.-M. Hu, 1982
- † Assiminea crassa D.-M. Zeng & J.-M. Hu, 1982 (accepted > unreplaced junior homonym)
- Assiminea crassitesta O. Boettger, 1893
- Assiminea dubiosa (C.B. Adams, 1852)
- Assiminea eliae Paladilhe, 1875 (taxon inquirendum)
- Assiminea estuarina Habe, 1946
- Assiminea fasciata (F. Krauss, 1848)
- Assiminea geayi Lamy, 1910
- Assiminea gittenbergeri van Aartsen, 2008
- Assiminea glaubrechti van Aartsen, 2008
- Assiminea globulus Connoly, 1939
- Assiminea grayana Fleming, 1828
- † Assiminea guangdongensis H.-J. Wang, 1982
- Assiminea habei Abbott, 1958
- Assiminea hessei O. Boettger, 1887
- Assiminea hiradoensis Habe, 1942
- Assiminea hungerfordiana G. Nevill, 1880 (taxon inquirendum)
- † Assiminea isoceles Connolly, 1939
- Assiminea japonica Martens, 1877
- Assiminea keniana D. S. Brown, 1980
- Assiminea kurodai Habe, 1942
- † Assiminea latiovata S.-Z. Guan, 1987
- Assiminea lugubris Turton, 1932
- Assiminea lutea (A. Adams, 1861)
- † Assiminea magna D.-M. Zeng & J.-M. Hu, 1985
- Assiminea marginata (Leith, 1853)
- Assiminea melanesica I. Rensch, 1937
- Assiminea mesopotamica Glöer, Naser & Yasser, 2007
- † Assiminea mirabilis D.-M. Zeng & J.-M. Hu, 1982
- Assiminea moroccoensis Rolán, 2013
- Assiminea morrisoni Abbott, 1958
- Assiminea navigatorum Benthem Jutting, 1963
- Assiminea occulta Rolán, 2013
- † Assiminea ovata D.-M. Zeng & J.-M. Hu, 1982 (accepted > unreplaced junior homonym)
- Assiminea ovata (Krauss, 1848)
- Assiminea palauensis Thiele, 1927
- Assiminea parasitologica Kuroda, 1958
- Assiminea parvula (Mousson, 1865)
- Assiminea parvula Morelet, 1877 (accepted > unreplaced junior homonym)
- Assiminea peaseana G. Nevill, 1880 (taxon inquirendum)
- Assiminea pecos D.W. Taylor, 1987 (pecos assiminea)
- Assiminea ponsonbyi Morelet, 1889
- Assiminea possietica Golikov & Kussakin in Golikov & Scarlato, 1967
- † Assiminea pressoopercula H.-J. Wang, 1980
- Assiminea principensis Rolán, 2013
- Assiminea punctum Morelet, 1882
- † Assiminea retopercula H.-J. Wang, 1977
- Assiminea rolani van Aartsen, 2008
- Assiminea rotunda W. T. Blanford, 1867 (taxon inquirendum)
- Assiminea saotomensis Rolán, 2013
- Assiminea savesi (Crosse, 1888)
- Assiminea schlickumi Brandt, 1974
- Assiminea schuetti Brandt, 1974
- Assiminea semilirata O. Boettger, 1893
- Assiminea senegalensis Rolán, 2013
- Assiminea sinensis Nevill, 1880
- † Assiminea skyensis F. W. Anderson & L. R. Cox, 1948
- † Assiminea striatura D. A. Bullis, Herhold, Czekanski-Moir, Grimaldi & Rundell, 2020
- Assiminea subconica (Leith, 1853) (taxon inquirendum)
- Assiminea subcylindrica I. Rensch, 1937
- Assiminea subeffusa O. Boettger, 1887
- Assiminea templeana G. Nevill, 1880 (taxon inquirendum)
- † Assiminea tergestina Stache, 1889
- Assiminea theobaldiana Nevill, 1880
- Assiminea thielei Abbott, 1958
- Assiminea translucens (Carpenter, 1864)
- Assiminea umlaasiana (E.A. Smith, 1902)
- † Assiminea waitemata Laws, 1950
- Assiminea woodmasoniana G. Nevill, 1880
- Assiminea yoshidayukioi Kuroda, 1959
- Assiminea zilchi Brandt, 1974
- Assiminea zubairensis Glöer & Naser, 2013

The Indo-Pacific Molluscan Database also includes the following species with names in current use :

- Assiminea interrupta Dautzenberg & Fischer, 1905 (uncertain > unassessed)

The database ITIS also mentions the following species :

- Assiminea auberiana Orbigny, 1842

== Synonyms ==
- Assiminea affinis Böttger, 1887: synonym of Taiwanassiminea affinis (Böttger, 1887)
- Assiminea affinis Mousson, 1874: synonym of Cryptassiminea buccinoides (Quoy & Gaimard, 1834)
- Assiminea andrewsiana E. A. Smith, 1900: synonym of Angustassiminea andrewsiana (E. A. Smith, 1900) (original combination)
- Assiminea angustata Pilsbry, 1901: synonym of Ansola angustata (Pilsbry, 1901)
- Assiminea antipodum Filhol, 1880 : synonym of Laevilitorina antipodum (Filhol, 1880)
- Assiminea australis Petterd, 1889: synonym of Cryptassiminea buccinoides (Quoy & Gaimard, 1834)
- Assiminea australis Thiele, 1927: synonym of Assiminea brevicula (Pfeiffer, 1855)
- Assiminea bedaliensis Rensch, 1934: synonym of Taiwanassiminea bedaliensis (Rensch, 1934)
- Assiminea beddomiana Nevill, 1881: synonym of Assiminea beddomeana G. Nevill, 1880 synonym of Austropilula beddomeana (G. Nevill, 1880) (misspelling)
- Assiminea bella Kuroda, 1958: synonym of Assiminea hiradoensis T. Habe, 1942
- Assiminea bicincta Petterd, 1889: synonym of Cryptassiminea buccinoides (Quoy & Gaimard, 1834)
- Assiminea bifasciata Nevill, 1880: synonym of Assiminea ovata (Krauss, 1848)
- Assiminea brevicula (Pfeiffer, 1854): synonym of Optediceros breviculum (Pfeiffer, 1855)
- Assiminea buccinoides (Quoy and Gaimard, 1834): synonym of Cryptassiminea buccinoides (Quoy & Gaimard, 1834)
- Assiminea caledonica (Crosse, 1869): synonym of Crossilla caledonica (Crosse, 1869)
- Assiminea californica (Tryon, 1865): California assiminea : synonym of Angustassiminea californica (Tryon, 1865)
- Assiminea capensis Bartsch, 1915: synonym of Assiminea ovata (Krauss, 1848)
- Assiminea carinata I. Lea, 1856: synonym of Cyclotropis carinata (I. Lea, 1856) (original combination)
- Assiminea castanea Westerlund, 1883: synonym of Angustassiminea castanea (Westerlund, 1883)
- † Assiminea conoidea von Koenen, 1882 : synonym of † Peringia conoidea (von Koenen, 1882) (new combination)
- † Assiminea contracta Cossmann, 1888 : synonym of † Peringia contracta (Cossmann, 1888) (new combination)
- Assiminea corpulenta van Benthem Jutting, 1963: synonym of Paludinella corpulenta (van Benthem Jutting, 1963) (original combination)
- † Assiminea crassa Etheridge, 1879: synonym of † Littoridina crassa (Etheridge, 1879) (new combination)
- Assiminea creutzbergi De Jong & Coomans, 1988: synonym of Barleeia creutzbergi (De Jong & Coomans, 1988)
- † Assiminea distinguenda Cossmann, 1899: synonym of † Peringia distinguenda (Cossmann, 1899) (new combination)
- Assiminea dohrniana G. Nevill, 1880: synonym of Ovassiminea dohrniana (G. Nevill, 1880) (original combination)
- † Assiminea eburnoides Cossmann, 1888: synonym of † Emmericia eburnoides (Cossmann, 1888) (new combination)
- † Assiminea elatior Cossmann, 1907: synonym of † Lapparentia elatior (Cossmann, 1907) (new combination)
- Assiminea gerhardtae De Jong & Coomans, 1988: synonym of Caelatura gerhardtae (De Jong & Coomans, 1988)
- † Assiminea gottscheana von Koenen, 1882: synonym of † Peringia gottscheana (von Koenen, 1882) (new combination)
- Assiminea granum Morelet, 1882: synonym of Paludinella hidalgoi f. granum (Morelet, 1882) (original combination)
- Assiminea hayasii Habe, 1942: synonym of Taiwanassiminea hayasii (Habe, 1942)
- Assiminea hidalgoi (Gassies, 1869): synonym of Paludinella hidalgoi (Gassies, 1869) (superseded combination)
- Assiminea infima Berry, 1947 (badwater snail): synonym of Angustassiminea infima (S. S. Berry, 1947) (original combination)
- Assiminea knysnaensis (F. Krauss, 1848): synonym of Hydrobia knysnaensis (Krauss, 1848) (superseded combination)
- Assiminea kushimotoensis Kuroda, 1958: synonym of Angustassiminea castanea (Westerlund, 1883)
- Assiminea latericea H. Adams & A. Adams, 1864: synonym of Pseudomphala latericea (H. Adams & A. Adams, 1864) (original combination)
- Assiminea lentula van Benthem Jutting, 1963: synonym of Taiwanassiminea lentula (van Benthem Jutting, 1963)
- Assiminea leptodonta Connolly, 1922: synonym of Eussoia leptodonta (Connolly, 1922) (correction of original combination)
- Assiminea lirata Turton, 1932: synonym of Tomichia tristis (Morelet, 1889) (junior synonym)
- Assiminea littorina (Delle Chiaje, 1828) sensu Philippi, 1841: synonym of Paludinella globularis (Hanley in Thorpe, 1844)
- Assiminea lucida Pease, 1869: synonym of Angustassiminea lucida (Pease, 1869) (original combination)
- Assiminea microsculpta Nevill, 1880: synonym of Sculptassiminea microsculpta (Nevill, 1880) (original combination)
- Assiminea miniata Martens, 1866: synonym of Assiminea brevicula (Pfeiffer, 1855): synonym of Optediceros breviculum (Pfeiffer, 1855) (junior synonym)
- Assiminea miyazakii Habe, 1943: synonym of Pseudomphala miyazakii (Habe, 1943) (original combination)
- † Assiminea nicolasi ROman, 1912: synonym of † Hydrobia nicolasi (Roman, 1912) (new combination)
- Assiminea nitida (Pease, 1865): this species belongs to the genus Paludinella as has been demonstrated by Thiele (1927, p. 128), because of a different dentition and an open umbilicus: synonym of Angustassiminea nitida (Pease, 1865)
- Assiminea ostiorum Bavay, 1920: synonym of Assiminea grayana J. Fleming, 1828
- Assiminea pagodella Hedley, 1903: synonym of Ascorhis victoriae (Tenison-Woods, 1878)
- Assiminea philippinica Boettger, 1887: synonym of Metassiminea philippinica (Boettger, 1887) (basionym)
- Assiminea queenslandica Thiele, 1927: synonym of Taiwanassiminea affinis (Böttger, 1887)
- Assiminea recta Mousson, 1874: synonym of Peringia ulvae (Pennant, 1777)
- Assiminea relata Cotton, 1942; synonym of Cryptassiminea buccinoides (Quoy & Gaimard, 1834)
- Assiminea riparia van Benthem Jutting, 1963: synonym of Taiwanassiminea riparia (van Benthem Jutting, 1963)
- Assiminea rubella Blanford, 1867: synonym of Assiminea brevicula (Pfeiffer, 1855): synonym of Optediceros breviculum ^{(Pfeiffer, 1855)} (junior synonym)
- Assiminea rufostrigata Hesse, 1916: synonym of Pontiturboella rufostrigata (Hesse, 1916)
- Assiminea satsumana Habe, 1942: synonym of Angustassiminea satsumana (Habe, 1942) (original combination)
- Assiminea septentrionalis Habe, 1942: synonym of Assiminea japonica E. von Martens, 1877
- Assiminea sororcula van Benthem Jutting, 1963: synonym of Taiwanassiminea sororcula (van Benthem Jutting, 1963)
- † Assiminea stenochora Cossmann, 1888: synonym of † Lapparentia stenochora (Cossmann, 1888) (new combination)
- Assiminea succinea (Pfeiffer, 1840) : Atlantic assiminea : synonym of Angustassiminea succinea (L. Pfeiffer, 1840)
- Assiminea tasmanica Tenison-Woods, 1876: synonym of Cryptassiminea buccinoides (Quoy & Gaimard, 1834)
- Assiminea tyttha Melvill & Ponsonby, 1897: synonym of Hydrocena noticola Benson, 1856
- Assiminea violacea Heude, 1882: synonym of Euassiminea violacea (Heude, 1882) (superseded combination)
- Assiminea vulgaris (Webster, 1905): synonym of Angustassiminea vulgaris (W. H. Webster, 1905) (superseded combination)
