= List of non-marine molluscs of Iraq =

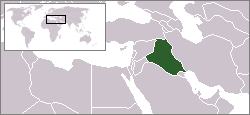
Location of Iraq

This is a list of all non-marine molluscs of Iraq.

== Freshwater gastropods ==
Neritidae

- Theodoxus jordani (Sowerby, 1844)

Assimineidae

- Assiminea mesopotamica Glöer, Naser & Yasser, 2007
- Assiminea zubairensis Glöer & Naser, 2013

Bithyniidae

- Bithynia hareerensis Glöer & Naser, 2008

Viviparidae

- Bellamya bengalensis (Lamarck, 1822)

Melanopsidae

- Melanopsis buccinoidea Olivier, 1801
- Melanopsis costata (Olivier, 1804)
- Melanopsis nodosa A. Férussac, 1822

Thiaridae

- Melanoides tuberculata (O. F. Müller, 1774)

Lymnaeidae

- Lymnaea auricularia (Linnaeus, 1758)

Physidae

- Physella acuta (Draparnaud, 1805)

Planorbidae

- Bulinus truncatus (Audouin, 1827)
- Gyraulus huwaizahensis Glöer & Naser, 2005

== Land gastropods ==
Orculidae

- Orculella palatalis (Pilsbry, 1922)
- Orculella sirianocoriensis libanotica (Tristram, 1865)

Helicidae

- Eobania vermiculata (O. F. Müller, 1774)

== Freshwater bivalves ==
- Sinanodonta woodiana (Lea, 1834)

== See also ==
Lists of non-marine molluscs of surrounding countries:

- List of non-marine molluscs of Turkey
- List of non-marine molluscs of Iran
- List of non-marine molluscs of Jordan
