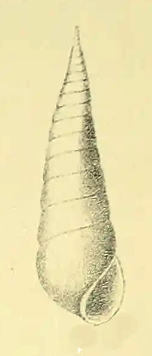
- Shell of Melanella acuformis (original drawing)

Scientific classification
- Kingdom: Animalia
- Phylum: Mollusca
- Class: Gastropoda
- Subclass: Caenogastropoda
- Order: Littorinimorpha
- Family: Eulimidae
- Genus: Melanella
- Species: M. acuformis

Binomial name
- Melanella acuformis G. Nevill & H. Nevill, 1875

Synonyms
- Eulima acuformis G. Nevill & H. Nevill, 1875; Eulima balteata Preston, 1908

= Melanella acuformis =

Species of gastropod

Melanella acuformis is a species of sea snail, a marine gastropod mollusk in the family Eulimidae. This species, along with multiple other known species, belongs in the genus, Melanella.

== Description ==
The length of the shell attains 10 mm, its diameter 2,75 mm.

(Original description) The shell is very elongate and sharply pointed, with a white, shining, solid, and somewhat flexuous form. It consists of seventeen cylindrical whorls, which are slightly angulate at their bases, except for the body whorl, which is short and rounded. The suture is not marked by an impressed line, and the varices continue obliquely from one whorl to the next. The aperture is oblong, slightly produced anteriorly, and rounded at the base. The columella is reflected, while the outer lip is scarcely thickened.

== Distribution ==
This marine species occurs off the Andaman Islands, Bay of Bengal.
