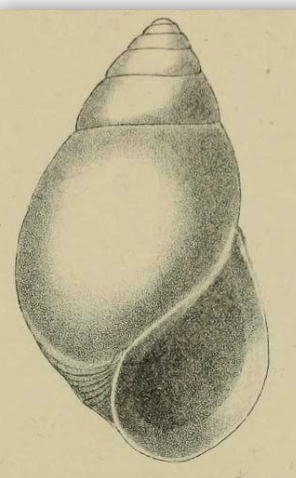
- Shell of Assiminea hungerfordiana (holotype)

Scientific classification
- Kingdom: Animalia
- Phylum: Mollusca
- Class: Gastropoda
- Subclass: Caenogastropoda
- Order: Littorinimorpha
- Family: Assimineidae
- Genus: Assiminea
- Species: A. hungerfordiana

Binomial name
- Assiminea hungerfordiana G. Nevill, 1880

= Assiminea hungerfordiana =

Species of gastropod

Assiminea hungerfordiana is a species of small operculate snail, a marine gastropod mollusc or micromollusc in the family Assimineidae.

This is a taxon inquirendum.

== Description ==
(Original description in Latin) The shell is without umbilicus. It is ovate-conical, solid, shining, smooth, and polished. It is entirely bright chestnut-colored, with a suture that is somewhat indistinct.

The spire is short, with an apex that is scarcely acute. It has six whorls, which are somewhat swollen and rather convex. The large body whorl is regularly ovuliform (egg-shaped), and it is noted below the suture by a somewhat faint impressed line.

The aperture is vertical. The margins are joined by a chestnut-colored callus. The outer lip is thin. The inner lip is thickened, straight, slightly backward-sloping, and somewhat abruptly angled at the base.

== Distribution ==
This terrestrial species occurs in brackish waters in Myanmar and in the Philippines.
