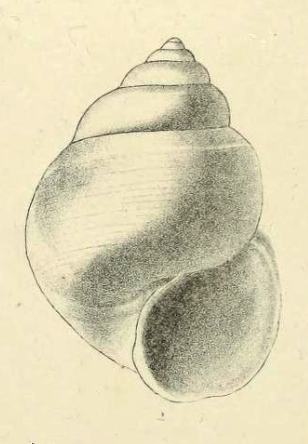
- Shell of Assiminea theobaldiana (holotype)

Scientific classification
- Kingdom: Animalia
- Phylum: Mollusca
- Class: Gastropoda
- Subclass: Caenogastropoda
- Order: Littorinimorpha
- Family: Assimineidae
- Genus: Assiminea
- Species: A. theobaldiana

Binomial name
- Assiminea theobaldiana G. Nevill, 1880

= Assiminea theobaldiana =

Species of gastropod

Assiminea theobaldiana is a species of small operculate snail, a marine gastropod mollusc or micromollusc in the family Assimineidae.

== Description ==
The length of the shell attains 4⅓ mm, its diameter 3 mm.

(Original description in Latin) The small shell is narrowly umbilicate. It is ovate-conical, and rather solid. It is horny-tawny and scarcely shining. Under a lens, it is very minutely and closely sulcate (grooved) in a spiral pattern. It is decussate (cross-hatched) by growth striae, which are more or less faint. The spire is conical, scarcely elongated and has an acute apex. It has 6 1/2 convex whorls. The uppermost whorls are nearly smooth. The remaining whorls are distinctly angulate below the suture, nearly smooth above, and spirally and closely sulcate below. They are obliquely and somewhat granularly decussate. The body whorl is subrounded and globose. In the middle, it is marked by decussating striae that are somewhat faint, becoming more distinct near the umbilicus. The aperture is quite wide and nearly vertical. The margins are joined by a shining callus. The inner lip is slightly twisted above and rounded below.

== Distribution ==
This species occurs in brackish waters in West Bengal, India.
