= Assiminea pecos =

Conservation status
- Endangered (IUCN 2.3)

- Critically Imperiled (NatureServe)

Scientific classification
- Kingdom: Animalia
- Phylum: Mollusca
- Class: Gastropoda
- Subclass: Caenogastropoda
- Order: Littorinimorpha
- Family: Assimineidae
- Genus: Assiminea
- Species: A. pecos

Binomial name
- Assiminea pecos Taylor, 1987

Species of gastropod

Assiminea pecos is a rare species of snail in the family Assimineidae known by the common name Pecos assiminea.

It is native to New Mexico and Texas in the United States. Specimens known from Mexico are now treated as members of a separate species, Assiminea cienegensis. The Pecos assiminea was federally listed as an endangered species of the United States in 2005.

This snail was first described in 1987. It is generally between 1 and 2 millimeters long. Little is known about its life history.

This tiny snail lives in the Pecos River basin in eastern New Mexico and western Texas. It inhabits karst topography, such as caves, caverns, and springs. It lives in mud and mats of saturated vegetation with small amounts of running water. The snail can be found at six sites: four in the Bitter Lake National Wildlife Refuge in New Mexico, one site at Diamond Y Spring and its drainage in Pecos County, Texas, and one site at East Sandia Spring in Reeves County, Texas.

Threats to this species and to other invertebrates living in the same habitat include the loss of the water sources that feed the karst cave network. This has been caused by the tapping of the aquifer beneath it; some areas have been drained dry. Diamond Y Spring and East Sandia Spring are in danger of being drained. The springs are also located in active oil and gas extraction regions, and pollution of the water is a threat. Fire is also a destructive force in the wildlife refuge habitat. The introduction of the decollate snail (Rumina decollata) is a potential threat, as it could be a predator upon the assiminea.
