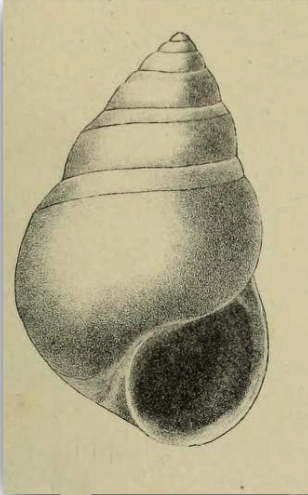
- Shell of Assiminea woodmasoniana (holotype)

Scientific classification
- Kingdom: Animalia
- Phylum: Mollusca
- Class: Gastropoda
- Subclass: Caenogastropoda
- Order: Littorinimorpha
- Family: Assimineidae
- Genus: Assiminea
- Species: A. woodmasoniana

Binomial name
- Assiminea woodmasoniana G. Nevill, 1880

Synonyms
- Assiminea (Assiminea) woodmasoniana G. Nevill, 1880 (unaccepted combination); Syncera woodmasoniana (G. Nevill, 1880) (unaccepted combination)

= Assiminea woodmasoniana =

Species of gastropod

Assiminea woodmasoniana is a species of small operculate snail, a marine gastropod mollusc or micromollusc in the family Assimineidae.

== Description ==
The length of the shell attains 4 mm, its diameter 2 1/5 mm.

(Original description in Latin) The shell is without umbilicus or is very minutely perforate in the umbilical region. The shell is circumscribed by a small and somewhat obsolete keel. It is lance-shaped, conical, rather solid, shining, and nearly smooth. The shell is pale chestnut-colored, banded with a pale reddish tint near the suture, and is margined by an impressed line. The spire is conico-elongate, and it nearly equals the length of the last whorl. The apex is very minute and very sharp (acutissimo). It has 7½ whorls, which are scarcely convex and increase regularly in size. The body whorl is somewhat compressed and obscurely subangulate. The aperture is small, nearly vertical, and ovate. The margins are joined by a thin callus. The inner lip is pale chestnut-colored, slightly thickened, nearly straight, and subangulate below.

== Distribution ==
This terrestrial species occurs in brackish waters in West Bengal, India.
