= Assiminea templeana =

Scientific classification
- Kingdom: Animalia
- Phylum: Mollusca
- Class: Gastropoda
- Subclass: Caenogastropoda
- Order: Littorinimorpha
- Family: Assimineidae
- Genus: Assiminea
- Species: A. templeana

Binomial name
- Assiminea templeana G. Nevill, 1880

Species of gastropod

Assiminea templeana is a species of small operculate snail, a marine gastropod mollusc or micromollusc in the family Assimineidae.

This is a taxon inquirendum.

== Description ==
The length of the shell attains 3¾ mm, its diameter 2½ mm.

(Original description in Latin) The ovate-conical shell is imperforate (lacks an umbilicus). It is very solid, thick, shining, and smooth. It is brown-horn colored, with a distinct suture that is not margined. The spire is conical and briefly elongated, with an sharp apex. It has 5½ whorls, which are rather convex and rapidly increasing in size. The body whorl is large, swollen and bulging, subangulate at the periphery, and slightly flattened at the base. The aperture is quite large. The margins are joined by a strong, sharp, and white callus. The outer lip is regularly convex-rounded. The inner lip is subrounded, double, and strongly reflected, completely covering the umbilical region. It is also distinctly and transversely marked with a single furrow above.

== Distribution ==
This terrestrial species occurs in brackish waters on the Nicobar Islands.
