= Assiminea peaseana =

Scientific classification
- Kingdom: Animalia
- Phylum: Mollusca
- Class: Gastropoda
- Subclass: Caenogastropoda
- Order: Littorinimorpha
- Family: Assimineidae
- Genus: Assiminea
- Species: A. peaseana

Binomial name
- Assiminea peaseana G. Nevill, 1880

Species of gastropod

Assiminea peaseana is a species of small operculate snail, a marine gastropod mollusc or micromollusc in the family Assimineidae.

This is a taxon inquirendum.

== Description ==
The length of the shell attains 5¾ mm, its diameter 3½ mm.

(Original description in Latin) The shell is very narrowly perforate, ovate-conical, remarkably thin, smooth, shining, and vividly straw-colored. It is margined at the suture by a livid, more or less faint band.

The spire is convex-conical and elongated, with an sharp apex. It has seven rather convex whorls. The body whorl is rounded, convex below, and is not keeled around the perforation.

The peristome is very regularly rounded and lacks an angle at the base. The inner lip is broadly dilated, somewhat double, and vividly tinted chestnut-brown. The aperture is nearly round, with margins that are joined by a somewhat obsolete chestnut-colored callus.

== Distribution ==
This terrestrial species occurs in brackish waters in Sri Lanka
