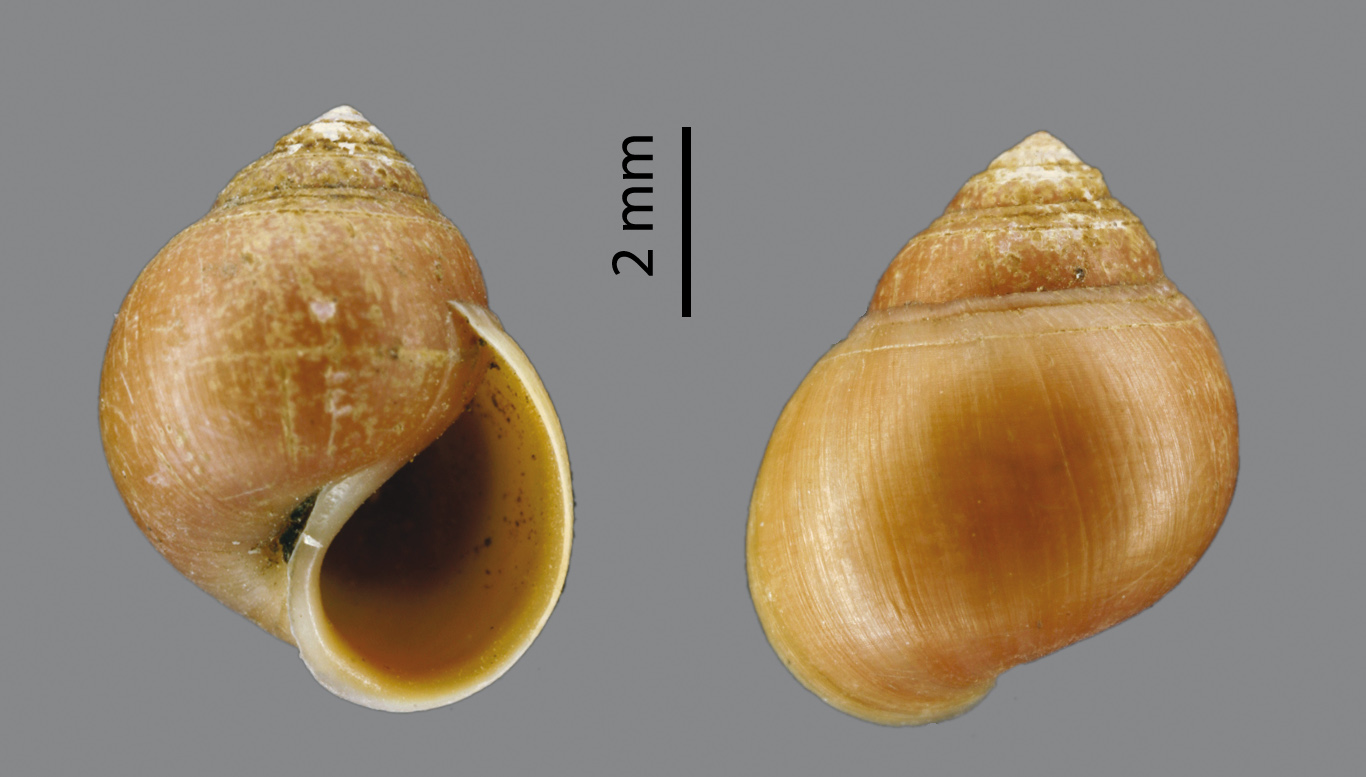
- Shell of Optediceros breviculum (specimen at MNHN, Paris)

Scientific classification
- Kingdom: Animalia
- Phylum: Mollusca
- Class: Gastropoda
- Subclass: Caenogastropoda
- Order: Littorinimorpha
- Superfamily: Truncatelloidea
- Family: Assimineidae
- Genus: Optediceros; Leith, 1853

Type species
- Optediceros marginatum Leith, 1853

Synonyms
- Sphaerassiminea Habe, 1942 (junior synonym)

= Optediceros =

Genus of gastropods

Optediceros is a genus of minute operculate snails, marine gastropod mollusks or micromollusks in the subfamily Ekadantinae of the family Assimineidae.

== Species ==
Species within Optediceros include:

- Optediceros breviculum (Pfeiffer, 1855)
- Optediceros marginatum Leith, 1853

Species brought into synonymy

- Optediceros corneum Leith, 1853: synonym of Assiminea cornea (Leith, 1853) (original combination)
