= Assiminea sinensis =

Scientific classification
- Kingdom: Animalia
- Phylum: Mollusca
- Class: Gastropoda
- Subclass: Caenogastropoda
- Order: Littorinimorpha
- Family: Assimineidae
- Genus: Assiminea
- Species: A. sinensis

Binomial name
- Assiminea sinensis G. Nevill, 1880

Species of gastropod

Assiminea sinensis is a species of minute, salt-tolerant snail with an operculum, an aquatic gastropod molluscs, or micromolluscs, in the family Assimineidae.

== Description ==
The length of this species attains 5 mm, its diameter 3 mm.

(Original description in Latin) The shell is imperforate, ovate-conical, and rather solid. It is shining, nearly smooth and chestnut-brown. It is marked by a slightly faint impressed line below the suture. The spire is elongated and conical, with a somewhat acute apex. It has 7½ rather flattened whorls. The body whorl is compressed, scarcely convex, and furnished with no keel. The aperture is small and nearly vertical. The margins are joined by a somewhat obsolete callus. The outer lip is thin. The inner lip is arched, thickened, and dark chestnut-brown. It is subangulate below.

== Distribution ==
This species occurs in Hong Kong in brackish waters.
