= Assiminea keniana =

Scientific classification
- Kingdom: Animalia
- Phylum: Mollusca
- Class: Gastropoda
- Subclass: Caenogastropoda
- Order: Littorinimorpha
- Family: Assimineidae
- Genus: Assiminea
- Species: A. keniana

Binomial name
- Assiminea keniana D. S. Brown, 1980

Species of gastropod

Assiminea keniana is a species of small operculate snail, a marine gastropod mollusc or micromollusc in the family Assimineidae.

== Distribution ==
This terrestrial species occurs in brackish waters in Kenya.
