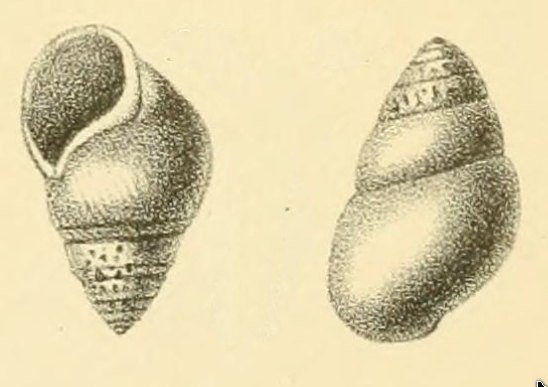
- Shell of Assiminea subeffusa (holotype)

Scientific classification
- Kingdom: Animalia
- Phylum: Mollusca
- Class: Gastropoda
- Subclass: Caenogastropoda
- Order: Littorinimorpha
- Family: Assimineidae
- Genus: Assiminea
- Species: A. subeffusa

Binomial name
- Assiminea subeffusa O. Boettger, 1887

= Assiminea subeffusa =

Species of gastropod

Assiminea subeffusa is a species of small operculate snail, a marine gastropod mollusc or micromollusc in the family Assimineidae.

== Description ==
The length of the shell attains 5¼ mm, its diameter 3 mm.

(Original description in Latin) The shell is moderate in size, briefly rimose (with a short chink), oblong-ovate, rather solid, chestnut-brown, smooth, and very shining. The spire is always corroded, quite elongated, and convex-conical. The apex is minute and appears to be rather blunt. It contains 6½ slightly convex whorls, which increase quite regularly in size. They are finely striate and very faintly spirally lineolate. The whorls are separated by a slightly impressed suture, and they are margined by a very slender spiral keel. The body whorl is equally rounded, not angled at the periphery, and nearly equals the height of the spire.

The aperture is larger, slightly oblique, subrhombic-oval, sharply pointed on both sides, and quite narrow. The peristome (margin) is simple and sharp. The margins are joined by a broad callus, which covers the chink. The columellar margin is long, rather strict, slightly thickened, and thinly reflected all around. The basal margin is angled and slightly effuse (spreading). The outer lip descends somewhat strictly from the suture.

== Distribution ==
This species occurs in Hong Kong
