= Assiminea yoshidayukioi =

Scientific classification
- Kingdom: Animalia
- Phylum: Mollusca
- Class: Gastropoda
- Subclass: Caenogastropoda
- Order: Littorinimorpha
- Family: Assimineidae
- Genus: Assiminea
- Species: A. yoshidayukioi

Binomial name
- Assiminea yoshidayukioi Kuroda, 1959

Synonyms
- Angustassiminea yoshidayukioi (Kuroda, 1959) ·

Species of gastropod

Assiminea yoshidayukioi is a species of small operculate snail, a marine gastropod mollusc or micromollusc in the family Assimineidae.

== Distribution ==
This species occurs in brackish waters on Honshu Island, Japan
