= Assiminea marginata =

Scientific classification
- Kingdom: Animalia
- Phylum: Mollusca
- Class: Gastropoda
- Subclass: Caenogastropoda
- Order: Littorinimorpha
- Family: Assimineidae
- Genus: Assiminea
- Species: A. marginata

Binomial name
- Assiminea marginata (Leith, 1853)

Synonyms
- Optediceros marginatum Leith, 1853 superseded combination

Species of gastropod

Assiminea marginata is a species of small operculate snail, a marine gastropod mollusk or micromollusk in the family Assimineidae.

Variety;

- Assiminea marginata var. major W. T. Blanford, 1867 (taxon inquirendum)

== Description ==
The length of the shell attains 4½ mm, its diameter 3 mm.

(Original description in Latin) The shell is imperforate or subrimose (having a slight chink) and is ovate-conoidal. It is rather solid, olive-green, and shining with an oily tinge. The shell is finely striate, and marked under a lens with very minute spiral lines.

The spire is conical, with convex sides and an acute apex. The suture is slightly impressed and broadly margined by a sometimes faint impressed line. It has six whorls, which increase in size slowly above and faster below, and they are slightly convex. The body whorl is large and globose below.

The aperture slightly exceeds the height of the spire, and it is slightly oblique and acutely angled above. The peristome (margin) is straight, with a thin outer lip. The inner lip is thickened and expanded.

== Distribution ==
This species occurs in brackish waters in India, Myanmar and the Philippines.
