= Assiminea habei =

Scientific classification
- Kingdom: Animalia
- Phylum: Mollusca
- Class: Gastropoda
- Subclass: Caenogastropoda
- Order: Littorinimorpha
- Family: Assimineidae
- Genus: Assiminea
- Species: A. habei

Binomial name
- Assiminea habei Abbott, 1958

Species of gastropod

Assiminea habei is a species of small operculate snail, a marine gastropod mollusc or micromollusc in the family Assimineidae.

Subspecies

- Assiminea habei habei Abbott, 1958
- Assiminea habei luzonica Abbott, 1958

== Distribution ==
This species occurs in the Philippines.
