= Assiminea japonica =

Scientific classification
- Kingdom: Animalia
- Phylum: Mollusca
- Class: Gastropoda
- Subclass: Caenogastropoda
- Order: Littorinimorpha
- Family: Assimineidae
- Genus: Assiminea
- Species: A. japonica

Binomial name
- Assiminea japonica E. von Martens, 1877

Synonyms
- Assiminea japonica septentrionalis Habe, 1942; Assiminea lutea japonica E. von Martens, 1877 superseded combination; Assiminea septentrionalis Habe, 1942

Species of gastropod

Assiminea japonica is a species of small operculate snail, a marine gastropod mollusc or micromollusc in the family Assimineidae.

== Description ==
The length of the shell attains 7 mm, its diameter 5 mm.

(Original description in Latin) The shell is lacks an umbilicus and convexly conical. It is rather solid, striate, and lacks any impressed spiral lines. The color is blackish-olive. It has 4½ rather convex whorls, which are separated by a sufficiently deep suture. The upper whorls are eroded. The body whorl is faintly angulate, and its base is slightly convex. The aperture is moderately oblique and pear-shaped. It is sharp above. The peristome is blunt and straight. The inner lip is thickened and whitish.

== Distribution ==
This terrestrial species occurs in brackish waters in Japan and Korea.
