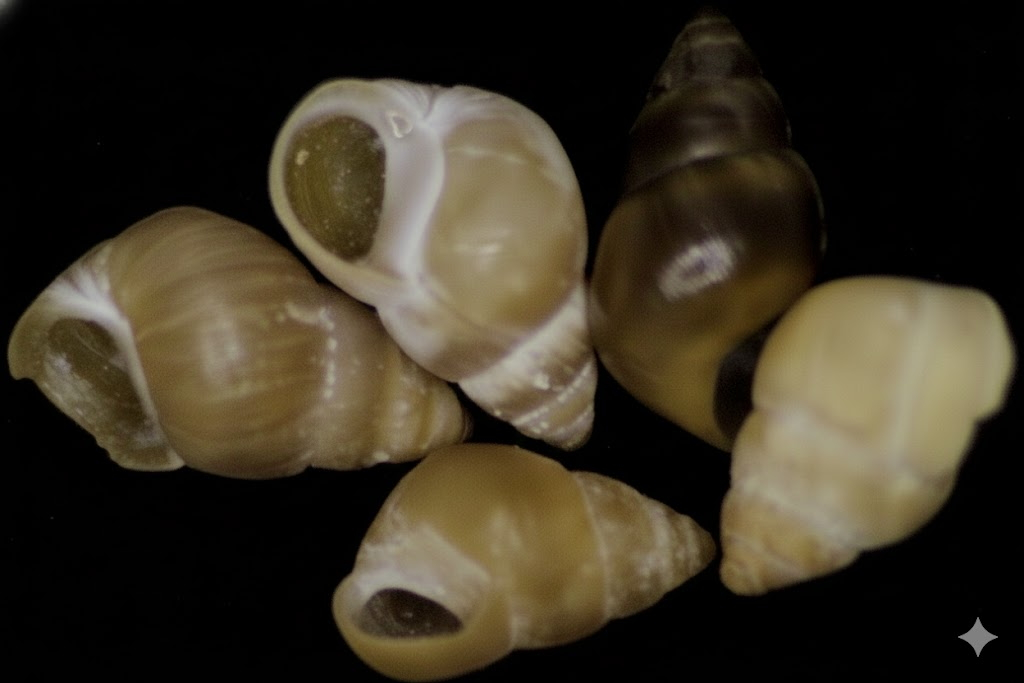
- Shell of Assiminea ovata

Scientific classification
- Kingdom: Animalia
- Phylum: Mollusca
- Class: Gastropoda
- Subclass: Caenogastropoda
- Order: Littorinimorpha
- Family: Assimineidae
- Genus: Assiminea
- Species: A. ovata

Binomial name
- Assiminea ovata (Krauss, 1848)

Synonyms
- Assiminea bifasciata Nevill, 1880; Assiminea capensis Bartsch, 1915; Paludina ovata Krauss, 1848 (original combination)

= Assiminea ovata =

Species of gastropod

Assiminea ovata is a species of minute operculate snail, a marine gastropod mollusk or micromollusk in the family Assimineidae.

== Description ==
The length of the shell attains 5½ mm, its diameter 3½ mm.

(Original description in Latin) The shell is ovately pointed, solid, yellowish, and smooth. It has seven slightly convex whorls. The body whorl is convex and is shorter than the conical spire. The suture is moderate.

The aperture is ovate, with an apex. The outer lip is simple and acute.

(Description in Latin by Nevill) The shell is imperforate, ovate-conical, and solid. It is scarcely smooth, somewhat shiny, and dull greenish. It is encircled by two brownish and somewhat faint bands. The spire is moderately elongated, convex-conical, with a somewhat acute apex. It has 6½ rather convex whorls. The body whorl is swollen and bulging and is subangulate at the periphery. The aperture is wide and nearly vertical. The margins are joined by a very strong callus, which has a brown edge. The inner lip is nearly straight, strongly thickened, dull brown, and somewhat rounded below.

(Described as Assiminea capensis Bartsch, 191) The shell is broadly conic and thick, with a light brown color. The whorls of the protoconch are not differentiated from the postnuclear whorls. The postnuclear whorls are well rounded and feebly shouldered at the summit. They are marked by decidedly retractive lines of growth and exceedingly fine spiral striations. The sutures are moderately constricted. The periphery of the body whorl is strongly inflated and obscurely angulate. The base is short, well rounded, and marked like the spire. The aperture is very large and irregularly ovate, with an acute posterior angle. The outer lip is thick within but thin at the edge. The inner lip is thick, appressed, and strongly curved. It is continuous with the thick callus covering the body whorl.

== Distribution ==
This species occurs in the Indian Ocean off Mozambique and South Africa.
