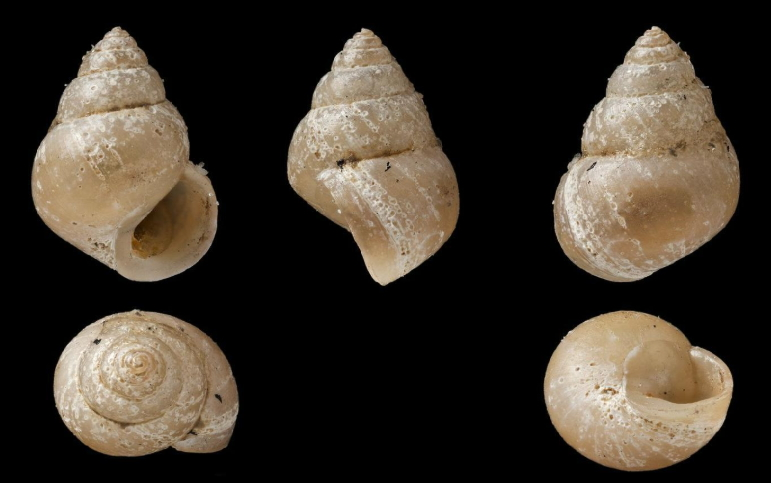
- Shell of Assiminea umlaasiana (specimen at the Natural History Museum, London)

Scientific classification
- Kingdom: Animalia
- Phylum: Mollusca
- Class: Gastropoda
- Subclass: Caenogastropoda
- Order: Littorinimorpha
- Family: Assimineidae
- Genus: Assiminea
- Species: A. umlaasiana

Binomial name
- Assiminea umlaasiana E. A. Smith, 1902

Synonyms
- Assiminia umlaasiana E. A. Smith, 1902 (original combination)

= Assiminea umlaasiana =

Species of gastropod

Assiminea umlaasiana is a species of small operculate snail, a marine gastropod mollusc or micromollusc in the family Assimineidae.

== Distribution ==
This marine species occurs off Port Alfred, South Africa.
