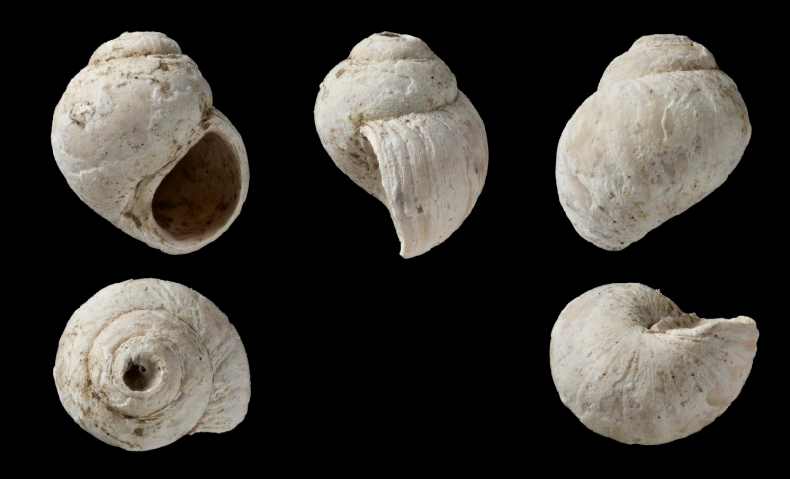
- Shell of Assiminea globulus (syntype at the Natural History Museum, London)

Scientific classification
- Kingdom: Animalia
- Phylum: Mollusca
- Class: Gastropoda
- Subclass: Caenogastropoda
- Order: Littorinimorpha
- Family: Assimineidae
- Genus: Assiminea
- Species: A. globulus

Binomial name
- Assiminea globulus Connolly, 1939

= Assiminea globulus =

Species of gastropod

Assiminea globulus is a species of small operculate snail, a marine gastropod mollusk or micromollusk in the family Assimineidae.

== Distribution ==
This species occurs at the Western Cape, South Africa.
