= Assiminea melanesica =

Scientific classification
- Kingdom: Animalia
- Phylum: Mollusca
- Class: Gastropoda
- Subclass: Caenogastropoda
- Order: Littorinimorpha
- Family: Assimineidae
- Genus: Assiminea
- Species: A. melanesica

Binomial name
- Assiminea melanesica I. Rensch, 1937

Species of gastropod

Assiminea melanesica is a species of small operculate snail, a marine gastropod mollusk or micromollusk in the family Assimineidae.

== Distribution ==
This terrestrial species occurs in New Britain, Papua New Guinea.
