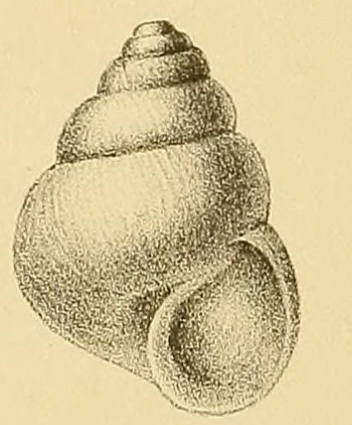
- Shell of Assiminea aurifera (holotype)

Scientific classification
- Kingdom: Animalia
- Phylum: Mollusca
- Class: Gastropoda
- Subclass: Caenogastropoda
- Order: Littorinimorpha
- Family: Assimineidae
- Genus: Assiminea
- Species: A. aurifera

Binomial name
- Assiminea aurifera Preston, 1912

Synonyms
- Assimania aurifera Preston, 1912 (misspelling of genus); Eussoia aurifera (Preston, 1912)

= Assiminea aurifera =

Species of gastropod

Assiminea aurifera is a species of small operculate snail, a marine gastropod mollusc or micromollusc in the family Assimineidae.

== Description ==
The length of the shell attains 3.75 mm, its diameter 2.75 mm.

(Original description) The shell is turbinate (top-shaped), perforate (having an open umbilicus), thin, semitransparent, and dark brownish horn-coloured. It is minutely and densely freckled with golden yellow.It has 5½ whorls, which are regularly increasing, shouldered above, and convex. These whorls are also very minutely spirally striate. The suture is well impressed. The umbilicus is moderately wide and deep. The columellar margin is very oblique and obtuse-angled and lightly outwardly reflexed; The outer lip is simple and acute. The aperture is irregularly roundly ovate.

== Distribution ==
This species occurs in Kenya.
