= Assiminea translucens =

Conservation status
- Apparently Secure (NatureServe)

Scientific classification
- Kingdom: Animalia
- Phylum: Mollusca
- Class: Gastropoda
- Subclass: Caenogastropoda
- Order: Littorinimorpha
- Family: Assimineidae
- Genus: Assiminea
- Species: A. translucens

Binomial name
- Assiminea translucens (Carpenter, 1864)

Synonyms
- Jeffreysia translucens Carpenter, 1864

Species of gastropod

Assiminea translucens is a species of small operculate snail, a marine gastropod mollusc or micromollusc in the family Assimineidae.

== Description ==
(Original description) The shell resembles a Barleeia, but with the columella thickened and the base rounded.

== Distribution ==
This species occurs in the San Diego area.
