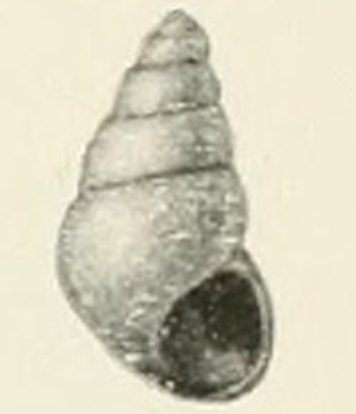
- Shell of † Assiminea aldra (holotype)

Scientific classification
- Kingdom: Animalia
- Phylum: Mollusca
- Class: Gastropoda
- Subclass: Caenogastropoda
- Order: Littorinimorpha
- Family: Assimineidae
- Genus: Assiminea
- Species: †A. aldra

Binomial name
- †Assiminea aldra Dall, 1915

= Assiminea aldra =

Species of gastropod

Assiminea aldra is an extinct species of small operculate snail, a marine gastropod mollusc or micromollusc in the family Assimineidae.

== Description ==
The length of the shell attains 2 mm, its diameter 1 mm.

(Original description) The shell is minute, composed of about five moderately rounded whorls with a distinct suture. The spire tapers evenly to a somewhat blunt apex, and the surface is smooth.

The body whorl comprises more than half the length of the entire shell.

The aperture is rounded ovate, and the peristome (lip) is moderately thickened but not reflected. There is a well-marked layer of callus on the body whorl, and the umbilical region is imperforate (closed).

== Distribution ==
Fossils of this species were found in late Oligocene to early Miocene strata of the Arcadia Formation in Tampa, Florida, USA.
