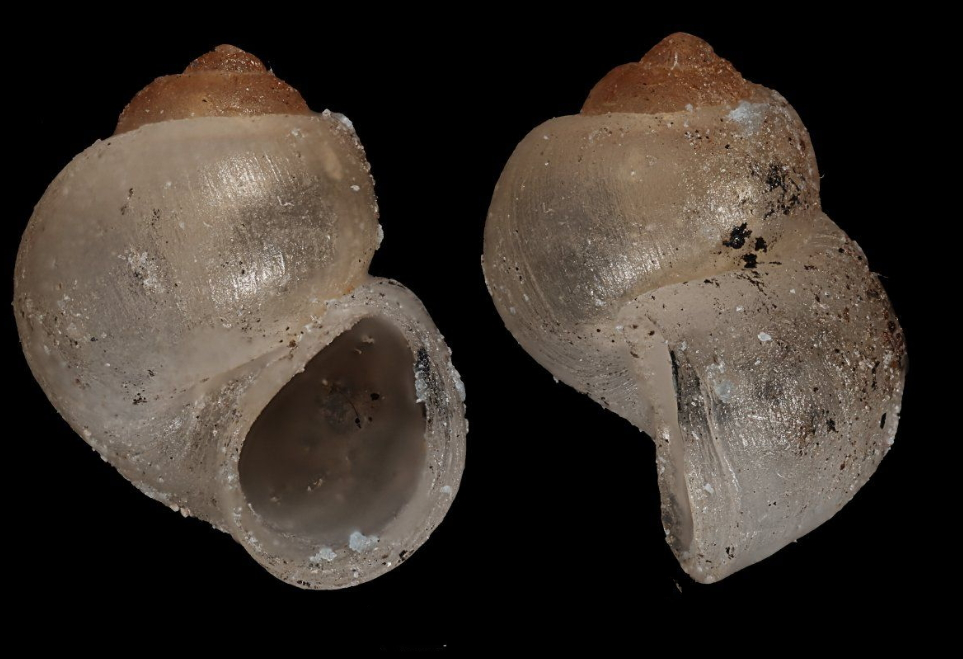
- Shell of Assiminea geayi (syntype at MNHN, Paris)

Scientific classification
- Kingdom: Animalia
- Phylum: Mollusca
- Class: Gastropoda
- Subclass: Caenogastropoda
- Order: Littorinimorpha
- Family: Assimineidae
- Genus: Assiminea
- Species: A. geayi

Binomial name
- Assiminea geayi E. Lamy, 1909

= Assiminea geayi =

Species of gastropod

Assiminea geayi is a species of minute operculate snail, a marine gastropod mollusk or micromollusk in the family Assimineidae.

== Description ==
The length of the shell attains 1.75 mm, its diameter 1.5 mm.

(Original description in Latin) The thin shell is very small. It is smooth, rather shining and shaped like a Natica shell. It is narrowly but quite deeply umbilicate. The spire is short. It has four whorls, which are joined by an impressed suture. The body whorl is very large and rounded. The aperture is ovate, slightly angled above, and rounded below, with a continuous peristome (margin). The color is yellowish-tawny, with a reddish apex.

== Distribution ==
This species occurs off the Madagascan coast.
