= Assiminea eliae =

Scientific classification
- Kingdom: Animalia
- Phylum: Mollusca
- Class: Gastropoda
- Subclass: Caenogastropoda
- Order: Littorinimorpha
- Family: Assimineidae
- Genus: Assiminea
- Species: A. eliae

Binomial name
- Assiminea eliae Paladilhe, 1875

Synonyms
- Assiminea (Assiminea) eliae Paladilhe, 1875 · alternative representation

Species of gastropod

Assiminea eliae is a species of small operculate snail, a marine gastropod mollusc or micromollusc in the family Assimineidae.

This rather obscure species is a taxon inquirendum.

== Description ==
The length of the species measures 3.5 mm, its diameter 2.0 mm.

(Original description in Latin) The animal is slow, sub-yellowish-whitish, and almost translucent. It has a mantle that is somewhat spreading, which fringes the edge of the shell's aperture. It possesses a snout that is quite wide, thin, sub-rosy (pinkish), slightly notched in the middle anteriorly, and elegantly marked above on both sides by subtle, grayish, concentric lines that are parallel to the convexity. It also shows a wider, curved grayish spot that surrounds the base of the tentacle. There are two denticles that are thick, very short, and blunt. Its eyes, considering the size [of the animal], are large, very black, and are situated almost at the extreme part of the tentacles. It has a foot that is sub-oval, slightly wider anteriorly, and nearly straight-lined, and it bears an operculum above its posterior part.

The shell is imperforate (not umbilicated), sub-globosely-conical, amber-horny, polished, and almost smooth, being scarcely marked here and there by growth lines that are more conspicuous toward the aperture. It is sub-translucent. The spire is conical, slightly extended, with a minute, sub-acute apex. It has 6-7 whorls that are slightly convex, somewhat flattened laterally, and which grow rapidly, especially from the fourth whorl. They are separated by an impressed, somewhat duplicate suture. The body whorl is equivalent posteriorly to twice the fifth of the shell's length, convexly-rounded, slightly ascending toward the aperture, with its free margin obliquely receding and nearly concave.

The aperture is ovate-rounded, somewhat pear-shaped, and sharply angled at the insertion of the lip. The peristome (lip edge) is interrupted, straight, sharp, and thin. The outer lip is slightly concave, somewhat protruding, and barely sub-angled at its junction with the lower columella. The columellar margin is straight, thin, and barely sub-spreading at its upper insertion.

The operculum is thin, horny-vitreous (glassy), and conspicuously engraved with irregularly spiral growth striae.

== Habitat ==
Like all the other species of the genus Assiminea, it is a pulmonate mollusc living on damp earth at the level of the tides, and, most often, near the mouths of more or less important riversor streams.

== Distribution ==
The holotype was found in the Bay of Biscay off La Rochelle and Bayonne; also off Portugal.
