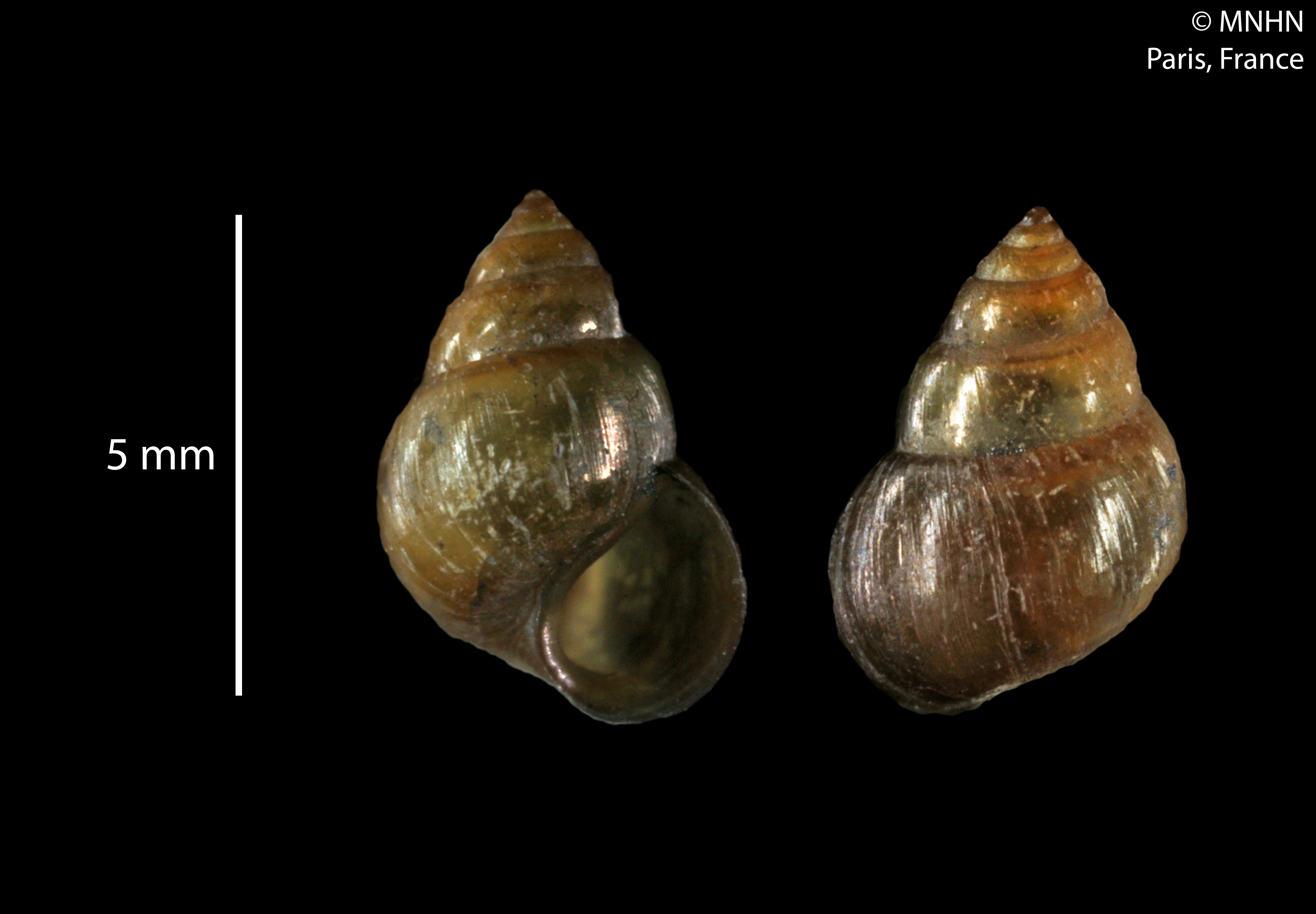
- Shell of Assiminea senegalensis (paratype at MNHN, Paris)

Scientific classification
- Kingdom: Animalia
- Phylum: Mollusca
- Class: Gastropoda
- Subclass: Caenogastropoda
- Order: Littorinimorpha
- Family: Assimineidae
- Genus: Assiminea
- Species: A. senegalensis

Binomial name
- Assiminea senegalensis Rolán, 2013

= Assiminea senegalensis =

Species of gastropod

Assiminea senegalensis is a species of minute, salt-tolerant snail with an operculum, an aquatic gastropod molluscs, or micromolluscs, in the family Assimineidae.

== Description ==
The length of this species attains 3 mm.

== Distribution ==
This species occurs in Senegal.
