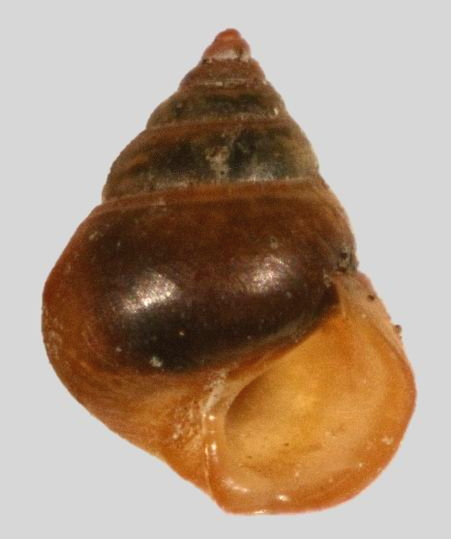
- Shell of Assiminea navigatorum (specimen at Naturalis Biodiversity Center)

Scientific classification
- Kingdom: Animalia
- Phylum: Mollusca
- Class: Gastropoda
- Subclass: Caenogastropoda
- Order: Littorinimorpha
- Family: Assimineidae
- Genus: Assiminea
- Species: A. navigatorum

Binomial name
- Assiminea navigatorum van Benthem Jutting, 1963

= Assiminea navigatorum =

Species of gastropod

Assiminea navigatorum is a species of minute, salt-tolerant snail with an operculum, an aquatic gastropod molluscs, or micromolluscs, in the family Assimineidae.

== Distribution ==
This species occurs in brackish waters in Irian Jaya
