= Assiminea schuetti =

Scientific classification
- Kingdom: Animalia
- Phylum: Mollusca
- Class: Gastropoda
- Subclass: Caenogastropoda
- Order: Littorinimorpha
- Family: Assimineidae
- Genus: Assiminea
- Species: A. schuetti

Binomial name
- Assiminea schuetti Brandt, 1974

Synonyms
- Assiminea (Assiminea) schuetti Brandt, 1974

Species of gastropod

Assiminea schuetti is a species of minute, salt-tolerant snail with an operculum, an aquatic gastropod molluscs, or micromolluscs, in the family Assimineidae.

== Description ==
The length of this species varies between 1.9 mm and 2.3 mm, its diameter between 1.2 mm and 1.4 mm.

== Distribution ==
This species occurs in Thailand in brackish waters.
