= Assiminea cincta =

Scientific classification
- Kingdom: Animalia
- Phylum: Mollusca
- Class: Gastropoda
- Subclass: Caenogastropoda
- Order: Littorinimorpha
- Family: Assimineidae
- Genus: Assiminea
- Species: A. cincta

Binomial name
- Assiminea cincta (A. Adams, 1861)

Synonyms
- Assiminia cincta A. Adams, 1861 (misspelling of genus)

Species of gastropod

Assiminea cincta is a species of small operculate snail, a marine gastropod mollusk or micromollusk in the family Assimineidae.

This is a taxon inquirendum.

== Description ==
(Original description in Latin) The shell is globularly cone-shaped, rather thin, and covered by a horny epidermis. The color is pale tawny. The spire is short. It has 4½ convex whorls. The body whorl is encircled by two reddish-brown transverse bands. The aperture is ovate-rounded. The outer lip is broad, callous, and tinted reddish-brown.

== Distribution ==
This species occurs in fresh waters in China of the estuary of the stream near the Great Wall; also in Japan.
