= Assiminea rotunda =

Scientific classification
- Kingdom: Animalia
- Phylum: Mollusca
- Class: Gastropoda
- Subclass: Caenogastropoda
- Order: Littorinimorpha
- Family: Assimineidae
- Genus: Assiminea
- Species: A. rotunda

Binomial name
- Assiminea rotunda W. T. Blanford, 1867

Species of gastropod

Assiminea rotunda is a species of small operculate snail, a marine gastropod mollusk or micromollusk in the family Assimineidae.

This is a taxon inquirendum.

== Description ==
The length of the shell attains 4 mm, its diameter 3 mm.

(Original description in Latin) The rather solid shell has an conoid-globose shape and is imperforate or rimose (having a chink). It is finely striate, shining with an oily tinge, scarlet with the superior whorls often turning whitish. The spire is cone-shaped, with convex sides and an sharp apex. The suture is impressed, and it is not margined. It has 6½ convex whorls, which are much larger. The body whorl is swollen and rounded below. The aperture exceeds the height of the spire, and it is nearly vertical, and acutely angled above. The peristome (margin) is straight, with a thin outer lip. The inner lip is slightly thickened and expanded.

== Distribution ==
This species occurs in brackish waters off Mumbai, India; also off Myanmar.
