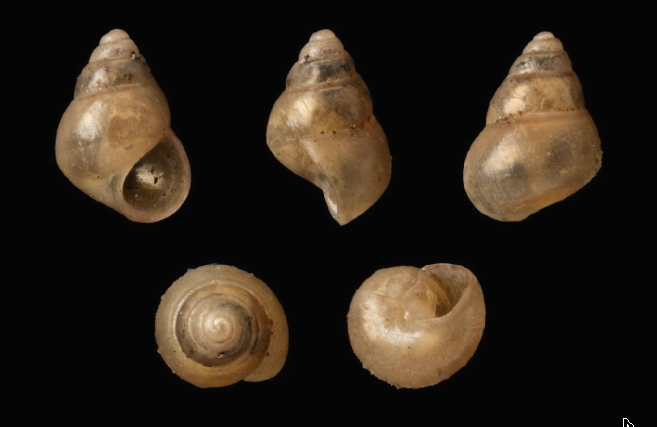
- Shell of Assiminea punctum (syntype at the Natural History Museum, London)

Scientific classification
- Kingdom: Animalia
- Phylum: Mollusca
- Class: Gastropoda
- Subclass: Caenogastropoda
- Order: Littorinimorpha
- Family: Assimineidae
- Genus: Assiminea
- Species: A. punctum

Binomial name
- Assiminea punctum Morelet, 1882

= Assiminea punctum =

Species of gastropod

Assiminea punctum is a species of minute, salt-tolerant snail with an operculum, an aquatic gastropod molluscs, or micromolluscs, in the family Assimineidae.

== Description ==
The length of this species attains 3 mm.

(Original description in Latin) The shell is very minute and scarcely rimose (having a very slight chink). It is ovate-conoidal, very smooth, shining, and horn-green.

The spire is elongated, with a somewhat acute apex. It has five convex whorls, which are joined by a black-margined suture. The body whorl is inflated and does not equal half the length of the shell.

The aperture is acutely oval, with straight margins, and it is brown-edged internally.

== Distribution ==
This species occurs on Mayotte, Indian Ocean.
