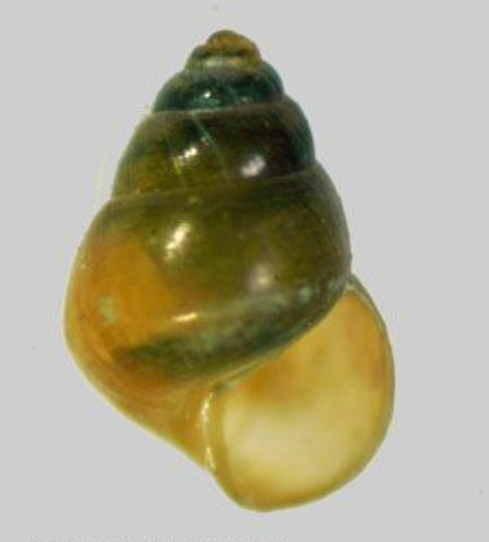
- Shell of Assiminea gittenbergeri (specimen at the Natural History Museum, Rotterdam)

Scientific classification
- Kingdom: Animalia
- Phylum: Mollusca
- Class: Gastropoda
- Subclass: Caenogastropoda
- Order: Littorinimorpha
- Family: Assimineidae
- Genus: Assiminea
- Species: A. gittenbergeri

Binomial name
- Assiminea gittenbergeri van Aartsen, 2008

Synonyms
- Assiminea (Assiminea) gittenbergeri van Aartsen, 2008 alternative representation

= Assiminea gittenbergeri =

Species of gastropod

Assiminea gittenbergeri is a species of small operculate snail, a marine gastropod mollusc or micromollusc in the family Assimineidae.

== Description ==
The length of the holotype measures 3.1 mm, its diameter 2.0 mm.

== Distribution ==
The holotype was found in brackish waters off Sfax, Tunisia; other occurrences off Spain, France, Italy and Croatia.
