= Assiminea lugubris =

Scientific classification
- Kingdom: Animalia
- Phylum: Mollusca
- Class: Gastropoda
- Subclass: Caenogastropoda
- Order: Littorinimorpha
- Family: Assimineidae
- Genus: Assiminea
- Species: A. lugubris

Binomial name
- Assiminea lugubris W. H. Turton, 1932

Species of gastropod

Assiminea lugubris is a species of small operculate snail, a marine gastropod mollusc or micromollusc in the family Assimineidae.

== Description ==
The length of the shell attains 7 mm, its diameter 5 mm.

== Distribution ==
This terrestrial species occurs in marine and brackish waters off Port Alfred, South Africa.
