= Assiminea estuarina =

Scientific classification
- Kingdom: Animalia
- Phylum: Mollusca
- Class: Gastropoda
- Subclass: Caenogastropoda
- Order: Littorinimorpha
- Family: Assimineidae
- Genus: Assiminea
- Species: A. estuarina

Binomial name
- Assiminea estuarina T. Habe, 1946

Synonyms
- Assiminea (Assiminea) estuarina T. Habe, 1946 alternative representation

Species of gastropod

Assiminea estuarina is a species of small operculate snail, a marine gastropod mollusc or micromollusc in the family Assimineidae.

This species occurs in brackish waters in Japan and Korea.
