= Assiminea semilirata =

Scientific classification
- Kingdom: Animalia
- Phylum: Mollusca
- Class: Gastropoda
- Subclass: Caenogastropoda
- Order: Littorinimorpha
- Family: Assimineidae
- Genus: Assiminea
- Species: A. semilirata

Binomial name
- Assiminea semilirata O. Boettger, 1893

Species of gastropod

Assiminea semilirata is a species of small operculate snail, a marine gastropod mollusc or micromollusc in the family Assimineidae.

== Description ==
The length of the shell varies between 4¼ mm and 4¼ mm, its maximum diameter 2¾ mm.

(Original description in Latin) The solid shell is narrowly umbilicate or widely perforate, ovate or conico-globose, uniformly horn-yellow, or horn-tawny with two slightly distinct brown bands around the middle part of the whorls. It is slightly shining. The spire is conico-convex, and the apex is sharp and briefly mucronate (ending in a small point).

There are 5 to 6 whorls, which are rather convex above and flattened below. They are separated by a deeply impressed suture. All the whorls are finely striate, and the upper whorls (except for the smooth initial ones) are encircled by deep grooves — there are 9 of these in the penultimate whorl. The body whorl is glabrate (smoothed), only indistinctly spirally marked with fine lines. It is subangulate at the base, flattened near the perforation, and very slightly constricted near the aperture. Its height usually does not equal the height of the spire.

The aperture is small, oblique, ovate, and more acuminate superiorly than inferiorly. The peristome is simple and sharp. The margins are joined by a rather thick callus.

The columellar margin is callused and concave, receding superiorly. The basal margin is thickened and very slightly effuse (spreading). The right lip is sloping from the suture and plainly convex.

== Distribution ==
This species occurs in the Philippines.
