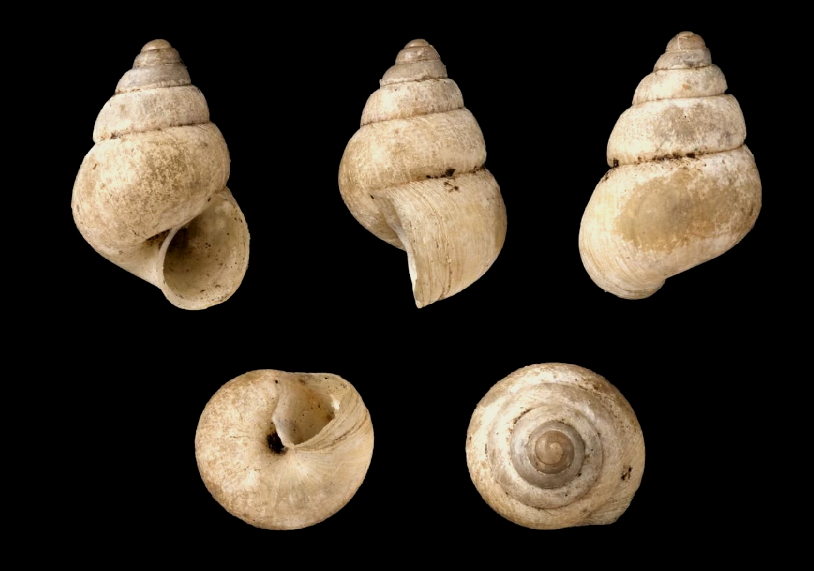
- Shell of Assiminea parvula (syntype at the Natural History Museum, London)

Scientific classification
- Kingdom: Animalia
- Phylum: Mollusca
- Class: Gastropoda
- Subclass: Caenogastropoda
- Order: Littorinimorpha
- Family: Assimineidae
- Genus: Assiminea
- Species: A. parvula

Binomial name
- Assiminea parvula (Mousson, 1865)

Synonyms
- Hydrocena parvula Mousson, 1865 superseded combination (original combination); Hydrocena similis Baird, 1873

= Assiminea parvula =

Species of gastropod

Assiminea parvula is a species of small salt marsh snail with an operculum, an aquatic gastropod mollusk, or micromollusks, in the family Assimineidae.

Subspecies

- Assiminea parvula dinagatensis (Abbott, 1948)
- Assiminea parvula guamensis (Abbott, 1949)
- Assiminea parvula marshallensis Abbott, 1958
- Assiminea parvula nitidula Thiele, 1927
- Assiminea parvula parvula (Mousson, 1865)
- Assiminea parvula pseudoquadrasi (Abbott, 1948)
- Assiminea parvula pygmaea (Gassies, 1867)
- Assiminea parvula quadrasi Möllendorff, 1895

== Description ==
The length of the shell attains 3⅓ mm, is diameter 2¼ mm.

(Original description in Latin) The shell is scarcely imperforate, ovate and elongately conical. It is finely striate, somewhat shiny, and uniformly reddish-horny. The spire is subconvex-conical. The apex is minute, and it is neither sharp nor blunt. The suture is linear and slightly impressed. The shell has five rather convex whorls. The body whorl is quite large, ovately rounded, convex below, and strongly rounded, but not angled, at the

== Distribution ==
This brackish and terrestrial species occurs on islands of the Pacific Ocean and the South Seas.
