= Assiminea compacta =

Scientific classification
- Kingdom: Animalia
- Phylum: Mollusca
- Class: Gastropoda
- Subclass: Caenogastropoda
- Order: Littorinimorpha
- Family: Assimineidae
- Genus: Assiminea
- Species: A. compacta

Binomial name
- Assiminea compacta (P. P. Carpenter, 1864)

Synonyms
- Hydrobia compacta P. P. Carpenter, 1864 ·

Species of gastropod

Assiminea compacta is a species of small operculate snail, a marine gastropod mollusc or micromollusc in the family Assimineidae.

== Description ==
(Original description in Latin) The shell is smooth, short, compact, and rather broad. The margins of the spire are scarcely curved outwards. The four whorls are normal, with an apex that is mamillate (nipple-shaped). The whorls are tumid (swollen) with distinct sutures. The spire is shorter, and the base is rounded. The aperture is somewhat oval. The peritreme (the continuous margin of the aperture) is continuous, and the outer lip is well-defined.

== Distribution ==
This species occurs in the Rio Grande region.
