= Assiminea parasitologica =

Scientific classification
- Kingdom: Animalia
- Phylum: Mollusca
- Class: Gastropoda
- Subclass: Caenogastropoda
- Order: Littorinimorpha
- Family: Assimineidae
- Genus: Assiminea
- Species: A. parasitologica

Binomial name
- Assiminea parasitologica Kuroda, 1958

Species of gastropod

Assiminea parasitologica is a species of small salt marsh snail with an operculum, an aquatic gastropod mollusk, or micromollusks, in the family Assimineidae.

== Distribution ==
This marine species is endemic to Japan and occurs also in brackish waters.
