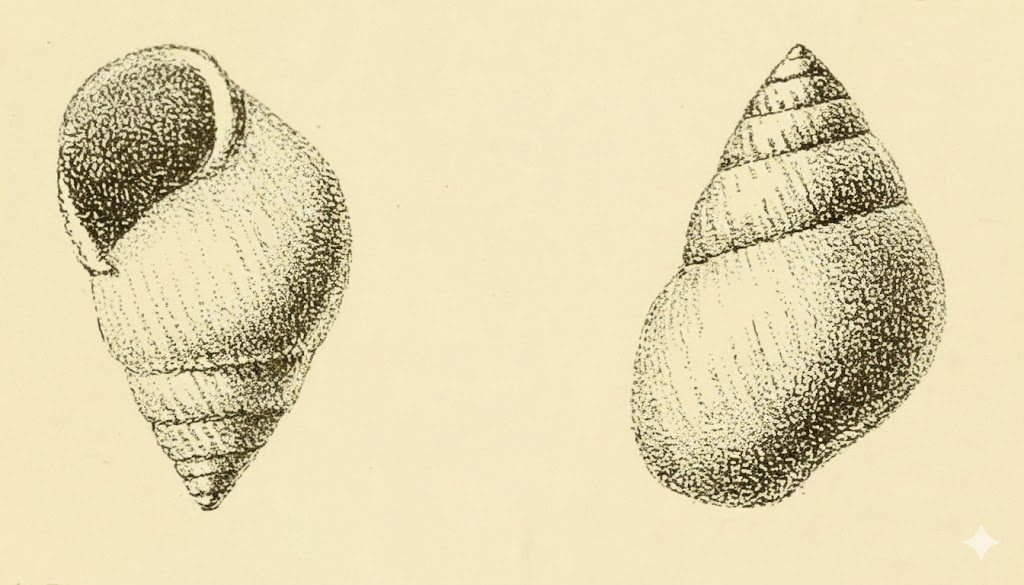
- Shell of Assiminea hessei (holotype)

Scientific classification
- Kingdom: Animalia
- Phylum: Mollusca
- Class: Gastropoda
- Subclass: Caenogastropoda
- Order: Littorinimorpha
- Family: Assimineidae
- Genus: Assiminea
- Species: A. hessei

Binomial name
- Assiminea hessei O. Boettger, 1887

= Assiminea hessei =

Species of gastropod

Assiminea hessei is a species of small operculate snail, a marine gastropod mollusc or micromollusc in the family Assimineidae.

== Description ==
The length of the shell attains 2 5/8 mm, its diameter 1 7/8 mm.

(Original description in Latin) The small shell is either very briefly rimose (with a narrow chink) or not rimose. It is conico-ovate, scarcely solid, slightly translucent and blackish-brown. It is worn away here and there with very fine whitish streaks and is very shining. The spire is convexo-conical, and the apex is acute.

It has six rather convex whorls, which are separated by an impressed suture and which increase quite slowly. They are finely striate. The body whorl is slightly swollen, scarcely subangulate at the periphery, and barely equals half of the shell's height.

The aperture is smaller, oblique, ovate, and angulate on both sides. The peristome is simple and acute. The margins are joined by a very thin callus, which covers a chink underneath. The columellar margin is vertical, slightly curved and thickened, and reflexed. The basal margin spreads slightly angularly. The outer lip is well arched.

== Distribution ==
This species occurs in the Democratic Republic of the Congo.
