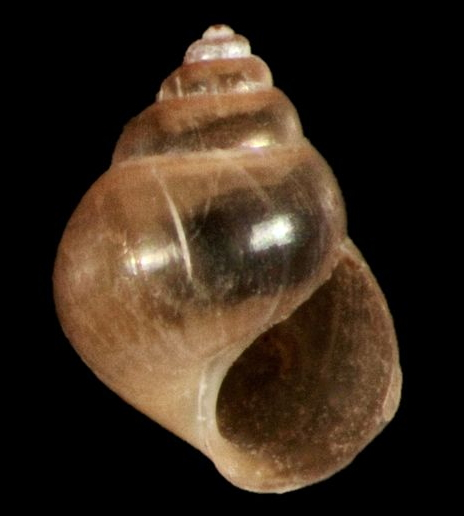
- Shell of Assiminea glaubrechti (paratype at Naturalis Biodiversity Center)

Scientific classification
- Kingdom: Animalia
- Phylum: Mollusca
- Class: Gastropoda
- Subclass: Caenogastropoda
- Order: Littorinimorpha
- Family: Assimineidae
- Genus: Assiminea
- Species: A. glaubrechti

Binomial name
- Assiminea glaubrechti van Aartsen, 2008

Synonyms
- Assiminea (Assiminea) glaubrechti van Aartsen, 2008 alternative representation

= Assiminea glaubrechti =

Species of gastropod

Assiminea glaubrechti is a species of small operculate snail, a marine gastropod mollusc or micromollusc in the family Assimineidae.

== Description ==
The length of the shell attains 2.6 mm, its diameter is 1.9 mm.

== Distribution ==
This species occurs in the Bay of Biscay off Bayonne, France.
