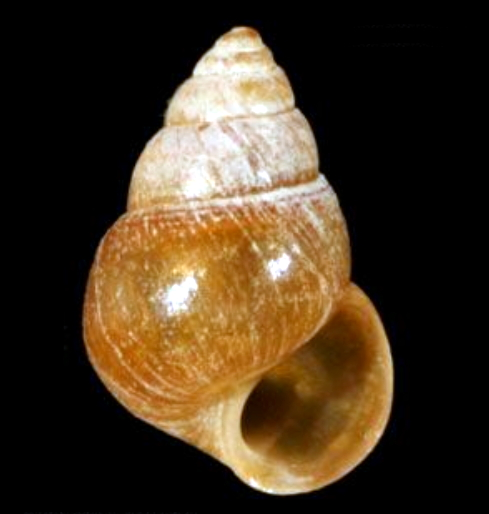
- Shell of Assiminea avilai (paratype at the Natural History Museum, Rotterdam)

Scientific classification
- Kingdom: Animalia
- Phylum: Mollusca
- Class: Gastropoda
- Subclass: Caenogastropoda
- Order: Littorinimorpha
- Family: Assimineidae
- Genus: Assiminea
- Species: A. avilai

Binomial name
- Assiminea avilai van Aartsen, 2008

Synonyms
- Assiminea (Assiminea) avilai van Aartsen, 2008 alternative representation

= Assiminea avilai =

Species of gastropod

Assiminea avilai is a species of minute operculate snail, a marine gastropod mollusc or micromollusc in the family Assimineidae.

== Description ==
The length of the shell ranges from 2.5 mm to 3.5 mm.

== Distribution ==
This species occurs on the Azores.
