= Assiminea subcylindrica =

Scientific classification
- Kingdom: Animalia
- Phylum: Mollusca
- Class: Gastropoda
- Subclass: Caenogastropoda
- Order: Littorinimorpha
- Family: Assimineidae
- Genus: Assiminea
- Species: A. subcylindrica

Binomial name
- Assiminea subcylindrica I. Rensch, 1937

Species of gastropod

Assiminea subcylindrica is a species of small operculate snail, a marine gastropod mollusk or micromollusk in the family Assimineidae. It was described by Ilse Rensch from a specimen found in New Ireland Province, Papua New Guinea.
