= Assiminea crassitesta =

Scientific classification
- Kingdom: Animalia
- Phylum: Mollusca
- Class: Gastropoda
- Subclass: Caenogastropoda
- Order: Littorinimorpha
- Family: Assimineidae
- Genus: Assiminea
- Species: A. crassitesta

Binomial name
- Assiminea crassitesta O. Boettger, 1893

Species of gastropod

Assiminea crassitesta is a species of small operculate snail, a marine gastropod mollusc or micromollusc in the family Assimineidae.

== Description ==
The length of the shell varies between 3½ mm and 4 mm., its maximum diameter between 2½ mm and 2¾ mm.

(Original description in Latin) The shell is either rimose (with a narrow chink) or perforate. The perforation is circumscribed by a more or less distinct keel. The shell is ovate-conical, solid, uniformly yellowish-horn-colored or tawny-horn-colored, and shining with an oily luster. The spire is conical with sides that are slightly convex. The apex is rather acute.The shell contains 6½ rather convex whorls, separated by a distinctly impressed suture. They are obliquely striate (marked with fine lines) and very faintly spirally lineolate. The whorls are encircled below the suture by a single, slender keel. The body whorl is slightly swollen, initially lightly angulate at the base, then rounded, and very slightly constricted before the aperture. It is equal to 2/5 to 3/7 of the height of the shell. The aperture is small, very oblique, ovate, and more acuminate above than below. The peristome is simple and acute (, slightly thickened internally. The margins are joined by a rather thick callus. The columellar margin is short and rather strict, receding superiorly and reflected above the perforation. The basal margin is sub-effuse (slightly spreading) angularly. The right margin is slightly sloping downward from the suture, and sub-retracted in its middle part.

== Distribution ==
This species occurs in the Philippines.
