= Assiminea savesi =

Scientific classification
- Kingdom: Animalia
- Phylum: Mollusca
- Class: Gastropoda
- Subclass: Caenogastropoda
- Order: Littorinimorpha
- Family: Assimineidae
- Genus: Assiminea
- Species: A. savesi

Binomial name
- Assiminea savesi (Crosse, 1888)

Synonyms
- Hydrobia savesi Crosse, 1888 (original combination)

Species of gastropod

Assiminea savesi is a species of minute, salt-tolerant snail with an operculum, an aquatic gastropod molluscs, or micromolluscs, in the family Assimineidae.

== Description ==
The length of this species attains 1½ mm, its diameter 0.75 mm.

(Original description in Latin) The shell is imperforate, pupiform, thin, and corneous. The spire is oblong, with a somewhat blunt apex. The suture is impressed. It has four slightly rounded whorls, which are encircled by a brown, nearly inconspicuous band. The body whorl nearly equals the height of the spire and is obscurely encircled by two brown zones. The aperture is ovate-pyriform andof the same color as the shell. The external zones pass inconspicuously through the interior. The peristome (margin) is continuous, somewhat thickened, and corneous.

== Distribution ==
This species occurs in New Caledonia in brackish and fresh waters.
