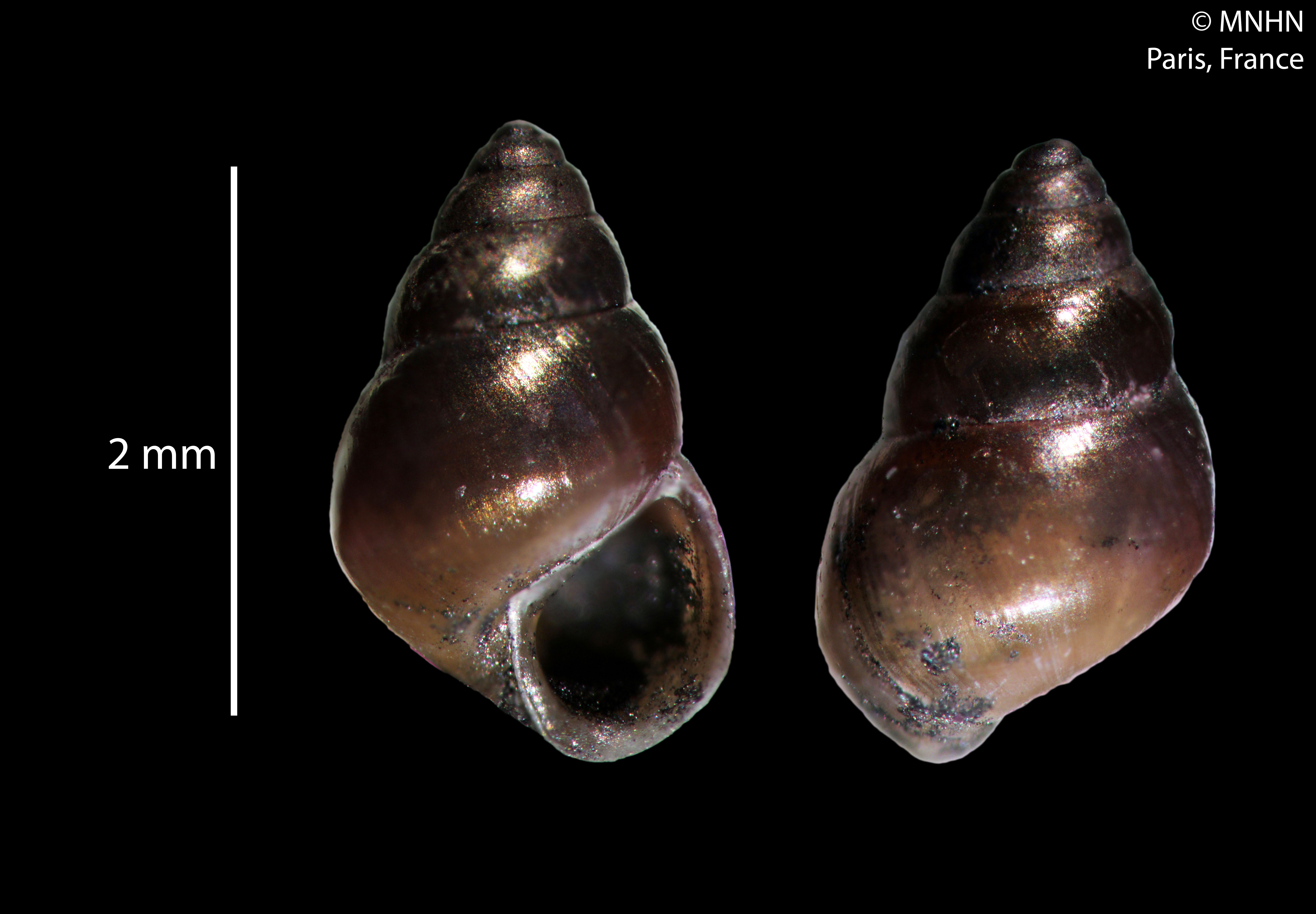
- Shell of Assiminea occulta (paratype at MNHN, Paris)

Scientific classification
- Kingdom: Animalia
- Phylum: Mollusca
- Class: Gastropoda
- Subclass: Caenogastropoda
- Order: Littorinimorpha
- Family: Assimineidae
- Genus: Assiminea
- Species: A. occulta

Binomial name
- Assiminea occulta Rolán, 2013

= Assiminea occulta =

Species of gastropod

Assiminea occulta is a species of minute, salt-tolerant snail with an operculum, an aquatic gastropod molluscs, or micromolluscs, in the family Assimineidae.

== Description ==
The length of this species attains 2.18 mm.

== Distribution ==
This species occurs in São Tomé (island) and Ghana.
