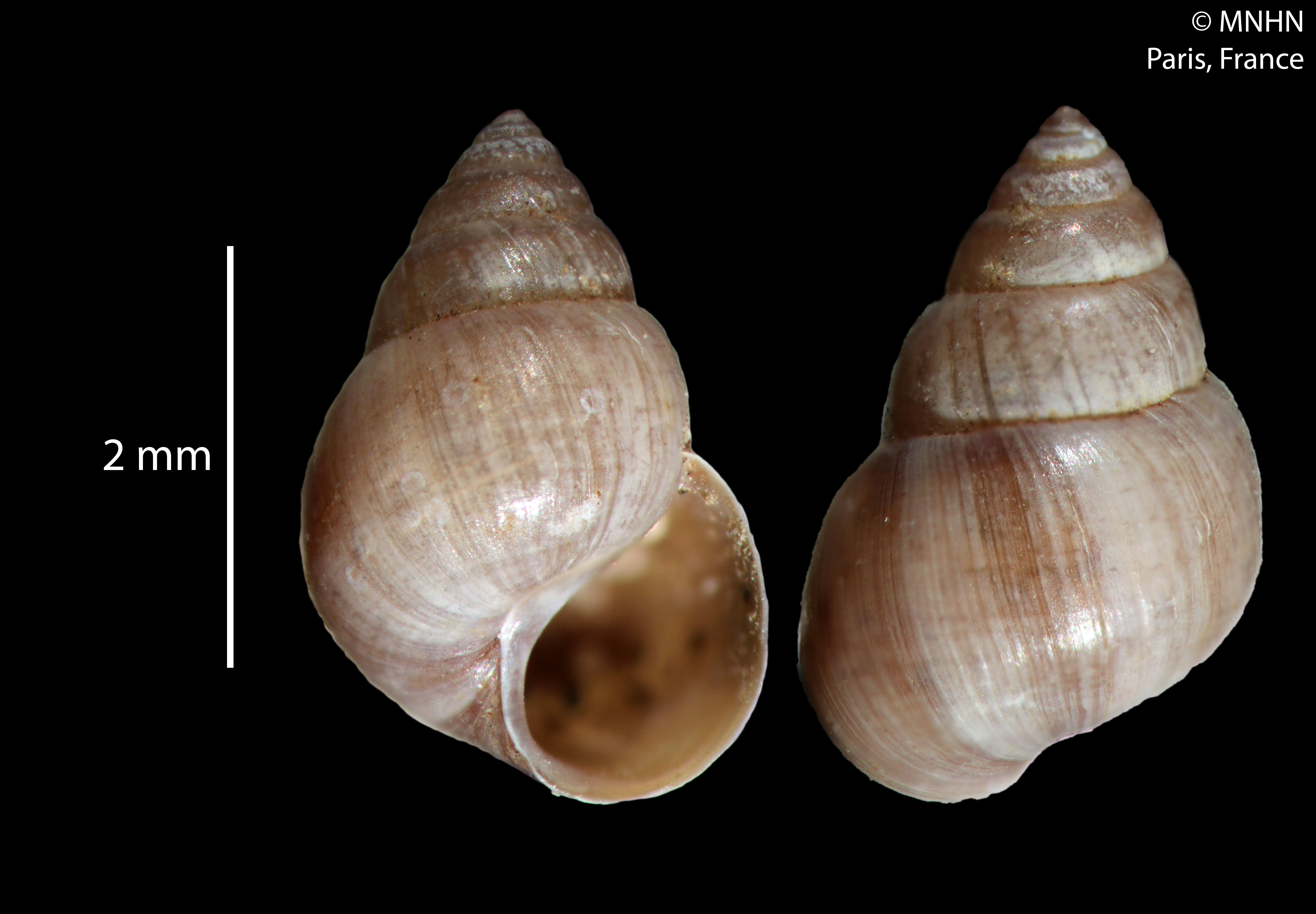
- Shell of Assiminea saotomensis (paratype at MNHN, Paris)

Scientific classification
- Kingdom: Animalia
- Phylum: Mollusca
- Class: Gastropoda
- Subclass: Caenogastropoda
- Order: Littorinimorpha
- Family: Assimineidae
- Genus: Assiminea
- Species: A. saotomensis

Binomial name
- Assiminea saotomensis Rolán, 2013

= Assiminea saotomensis =

Species of gastropod

Assiminea saotomensis is a species of minute, salt-tolerant snail with an operculum, an aquatic gastropod molluscs, or micromolluscs, in the family Assimineidae.

== Description ==
The length of this species attains 3.8 mm.

== Distribution ==
This species occurs in São Tomé (island).
