= Pontiturboella =

Scientific classification
- Kingdom: Animalia
- Phylum: Mollusca
- Class: Gastropoda
- Subclass: Caenogastropoda
- Order: Littorinimorpha
- Family: Rissoidae
- Genus: Pontiturboella; Sitnikova, Starobogatov et Anistratenko, 1992

Genus of gastropods

Pontiturboella is a genus of minute sea snails, marine gastropod mollusks or micromollusks in the family Rissoidae.

== Species ==
Species within the genus Pontiturboella include:

- Pontiturboella rufostrigata (Hesse, 1916)
