= Assiminea hiradoensis =

Scientific classification
- Kingdom: Animalia
- Phylum: Mollusca
- Class: Gastropoda
- Subclass: Caenogastropoda
- Order: Littorinimorpha
- Family: Assimineidae
- Genus: Assiminea
- Species: A. hiradoensis

Binomial name
- Assiminea hiradoensis T. Habe, 1942

Synonyms
- Assiminea bella Kuroda, 1958; Assiminea japonica hiradoensis T. Habe, 1942 superseded rank

Species of gastropod

Assiminea hiradoensis is a species of small operculate snail, a marine gastropod mollusc or micromollusc in the family Assimineidae.

== Distribution ==
This species occurs off Japan and Korea.
