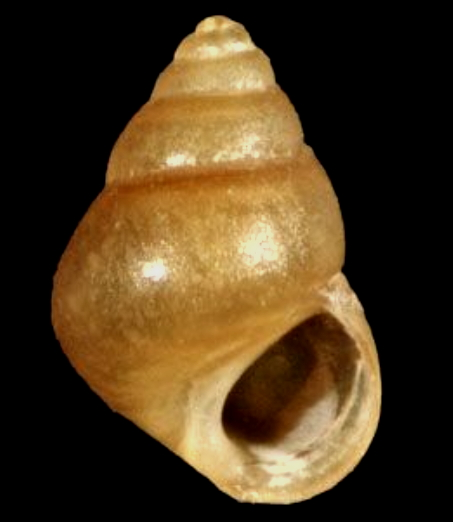
- Shell of Assiminea rolani (specimen at the Natural History Museum, Rotterdam)

Scientific classification
- Kingdom: Animalia
- Phylum: Mollusca
- Class: Gastropoda
- Subclass: Caenogastropoda
- Order: Littorinimorpha
- Family: Assimineidae
- Genus: Assiminea
- Species: A. rolani

Binomial name
- Assiminea rolani van Aartsen, 2008

= Assiminea rolani =

Species of gastropod

Assiminea rolani is a species of small operculate snail, a marine gastropod mollusc or micromollusc in the family Assimineidae.

== Description ==
The length of the shell attains 2.8 mm, its diameter 1.8 mm.

== Distribution ==
This species was found in Funchal, Madeira, Portugal.
