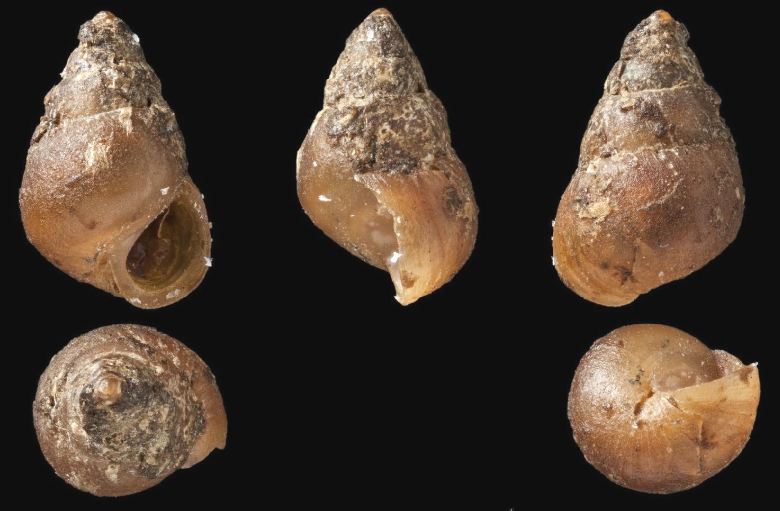
- Shell of Assiminea ponsonbyi (syntype at the Natural History Museum, London)

Scientific classification
- Kingdom: Animalia
- Phylum: Mollusca
- Class: Gastropoda
- Subclass: Caenogastropoda
- Order: Littorinimorpha
- Family: Assimineidae
- Genus: Assiminea
- Species: A. ponsonbyi

Binomial name
- Assiminea ponsonbyi Morelet, 1889

= Assiminea ponsonbyi =

Species of gastropod

Assiminea ponsonbyi is a rare species of snail in the family Assimineidae known by the common name Pecos assiminea.

== Description ==
The length of the shell attains 4½ mm, its diameter 2 mm.

(Original description in Latin) The shell is imperforate and rather solid. It is smooth, slightly shiny, and olivaceous .

The spire is elongated and sharp. It has six flattened whorls, which are joined by an impressed suture. The body whorl is inflated, faintly angled at the base, and equals half the length of the shell.

The aperture is oblique and pear-shaped. The margins are obtuse and straight, and they are joined by a rather thick, shiny callus.

== Distribution ==
This species was found near Port Elizabeth, South Africa.
