= Assiminea subconica =

Scientific classification
- Kingdom: Animalia
- Phylum: Mollusca
- Class: Gastropoda
- Subclass: Caenogastropoda
- Order: Littorinimorpha
- Family: Assimineidae
- Genus: Assiminea
- Species: A. subconica

Binomial name
- Assiminea subconica (Leith, 1853)

Synonyms
- Optediceros subconica Leith, 1853 original combination

Species of gastropod

Assiminea subconica is a species of small operculate snail, a marine gastropod mollusk or micromollusk in the family Assimineidae.

This is a taxon inquirendum.

== Description ==
The length of the shell attains 4 mm, its diameter 2¼ mm.

(Original description in Latin) The shell is imperforate or has a slight chink. It is ovate-conical, and rather solid. The color is pale orange. It is smooth and slightly shining .

The spire is conical, with sides that are scarcely convex and an sharp apex. The suture is slightly impressed, and it is not margined. It has seven nearly flat whorls, which increase gradually. The body whorl is rounded below.

The aperture is much shorter than the spire. It is slightly oblique, and angled (above. The peristome (margin) is straight, with a thin outer lip. The inner lip is scarcely thickened and somewhat expanded.

== Distribution ==
This species occurs in brackish waters off Mumbai, India.
