= Assiminea schlickumi =

Scientific classification
- Kingdom: Animalia
- Phylum: Mollusca
- Class: Gastropoda
- Subclass: Caenogastropoda
- Order: Littorinimorpha
- Family: Assimineidae
- Genus: Assiminea
- Species: A. schlickumi

Binomial name
- Assiminea schlickumi Brandt, 1974

Synonyms
- Assiminea (Assiminea) schlickumi Brandt, 1974

Species of gastropod

Assiminea schlickumi is a species of minute, salt-tolerant snail with an operculum, an aquatic gastropod molluscs, or micromolluscs, in the family Assimineidae.

== Description ==
The length of this species varies between 2.4 mm and 2.8 mm, its diameter is between 1.6 mm and 1.8 mm.

== Distribution ==
This species occurs in Thailand in brackish waters.
