= Assiminea possietica =

Scientific classification
- Kingdom: Animalia
- Phylum: Mollusca
- Class: Gastropoda
- Subclass: Caenogastropoda
- Order: Littorinimorpha
- Family: Assimineidae
- Genus: Assiminea
- Species: A. possietica

Binomial name
- Assiminea possietica A. N. Golikov & Kussakin, 1967

Synonyms
- Assiminea (Ovassiminea) possietica A. N. Golikov & Kussakin, 1967 superseded combination

Species of gastropod

Assiminea possietica is a species of snail in the family Assimineidae also known by the common name Pecos assiminea.

== Description ==
The length of the shell attains 4.5 mm, its diameter 2 mm.

== Distribution ==
This marine species was found in the Sea of Japan; also in brackish waters.
