= Assiminea alveolata =

Scientific classification
- Kingdom: Animalia
- Phylum: Mollusca
- Class: Gastropoda
- Subclass: Caenogastropoda
- Order: Littorinimorpha
- Family: Assimineidae
- Genus: Assiminea
- Species: A. alveolata

Binomial name
- Assiminea alveolata Viader, 1939

Species of gastropod

Assiminea alveolata is a species of small operculate snail, a marine gastropod mollusc or micromollusc in the family Assimineidae.

== Distribution ==
This species occurs in the Indian Ocean off Mauritius.
