= Assiminea dubiosa =

Scientific classification
- Kingdom: Animalia
- Phylum: Mollusca
- Class: Gastropoda
- Subclass: Caenogastropoda
- Order: Littorinimorpha
- Family: Assimineidae
- Genus: Assiminea
- Species: A. dubiosa

Binomial name
- Assiminea dubiosa (C. B. Adams, 1852)

Synonyms
- Truncatella dubiosa C. B. Adams, 1852

Species of gastropod

Assiminea dubiosa is a species of small operculate snail, a marine gastropod mollusc or micromollusc in the family Assimineidae.

== Description ==
(Original description in Latin) The thin shell is ovate-conical, transparent, yellowish-brown, smooth, and shining. The apex is rather sharp, and the spire is subconoidal (somewhat cone-shaped).

It has six convex whorls, with an impressed suture. The body whorl is short and ventricose (swollen/bulging). The aperture is broad and ovate. The outer lip is thin. The inner lip is slightly reflected below.

== Distribution ==
This species occurs in Panama and Guadeloupe.
