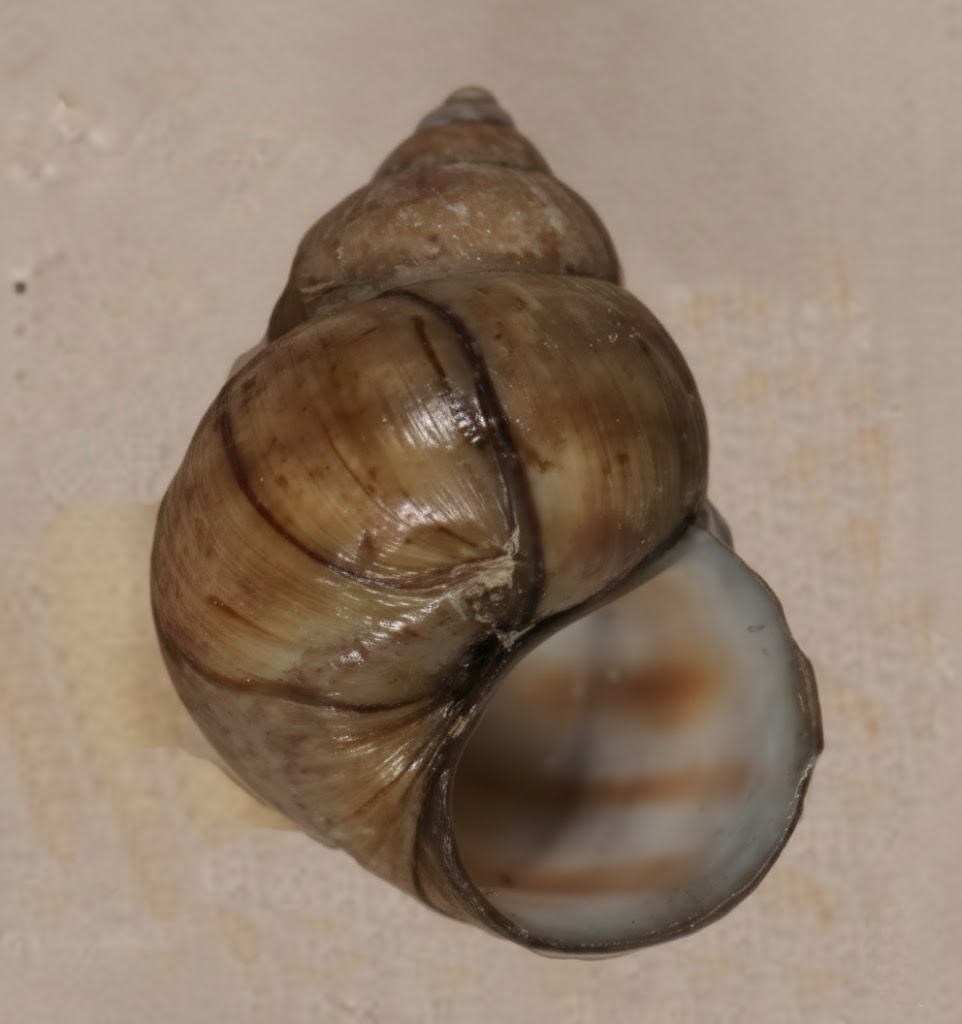
- Shell of Assiminea fasciata (specimen at the National Museum of Natural History, Luxembourg)

Scientific classification
- Kingdom: Animalia
- Phylum: Mollusca
- Class: Gastropoda
- Subclass: Caenogastropoda
- Order: Littorinimorpha
- Family: Assimineidae
- Genus: Assiminea
- Species: A. fasciata

Binomial name
- Assiminea fasciata (Krauss, 1848)

Synonyms
- Paludina fasciata Krauss, 1848 (original combination)

= Assiminea fasciata =

Species of gastropod

Assiminea fasciata is a species of small operculate snail, a marine gastropod mollusc or micromollusc in the family Assimineidae.

== Description ==
(Original description in Latin) The shell has an umbilicus. It is ovate, shining, dirty yellow, and smooth. It is ornamented with three reddish-brown bands. The shell has six convex whorls The body whorl is somewhat angled and swollen. The suture is deep. The aperture is obliquely ovate, and it nearly equals the height of the conical spire. The columellar margin is free and slightly upright. The outer lip is sharp.

== Distribution ==
This species occurs in brackish waters in South Africa.
