= Assiminea palauensis =

Conservation status
- Data Deficient (IUCN 2.3)

Scientific classification
- Kingdom: Animalia
- Phylum: Mollusca
- Class: Gastropoda
- Subclass: Caenogastropoda
- Order: Littorinimorpha
- Family: Assimineidae
- Genus: Assiminea
- Species: A. palauensis

Binomial name
- Assiminea palauensis Thiele, 1927

Species of gastropod

Assiminea palauensis is a species of small salt marsh snail with an operculum, an aquatic gastropod mollusk, or micromollusks, in the family Assimineidae.

== Distribution ==
This species is endemic to Palau.
