= Assiminea mesopotamica =

Conservation status
- Data Deficient (IUCN 3.1)

Scientific classification
- Kingdom: Animalia
- Phylum: Mollusca
- Class: Gastropoda
- Subclass: Caenogastropoda
- Order: Littorinimorpha
- Family: Assimineidae
- Genus: Assiminea
- Species: A. mesopotamica

Binomial name
- Assiminea mesopotamica Glöer, Naser & Yasser, 2007

Species of gastropod

Assiminea mesopotamica is a species of minute, salt-tolerant snail with an operculum, an aquatic gastropod molluscs, or micromolluscs, in the family Assimineidae.

== Distribution and habitat ==
This species is endemic to the Shatt al-Arab in Iraq. It is found amongst submerged vegetation in slow-flowing waters close to coastal regions, and is tolerant of brackish waters.
