= Badwater snail =

Conservation status
- Vulnerable (IUCN 3.1)

- Critically Imperiled (NatureServe)

Scientific classification
- Kingdom: Animalia
- Phylum: Mollusca
- Class: Gastropoda
- Subclass: Caenogastropoda
- Order: Littorinimorpha
- Family: Assimineidae
- Genus: Angustassiminea
- Species: A. infima

Binomial name
- Angustassiminea infima (S.S. Berry, 1947)

Synonyms
- Assiminea infima S. S. Berry, 1947

Species of gastropod

The Badwater snail (Angustassiminea infima) is a species of small salt marsh snail endemic to the Badwater Basin in Death Valley. It is found only at low elevations near spring sources, and only in regions with relatively low precipitation. It is capable of living completely submerged in the spring water.

The species was described in 1947.

Water level decreases and trampling from hikers threaten the Badwater snail, and as of 2001 the Badwater snail is at only approximately 15% of their natural population distribution.
