= Pontiturboella rufostrigata =

Scientific classification
- Kingdom: Animalia
- Phylum: Mollusca
- Class: Gastropoda
- Subclass: Caenogastropoda
- Order: Littorinimorpha
- Family: Rissoidae
- Genus: Pontiturboella
- Species: P. rufostrigata

Binomial name
- Pontiturboella rufostrigata (Hesse, 1916)

Synonyms
- Assemania rufostrigata Hesse, 1916; Assiminea rufostrigata Hesse, 1916 superseded combination

Species of gastropod

Pontiturboella rufostrigata is a species of small sea snail, a marine gastropod mollusk or micromollusk in the family Rissoidae.
