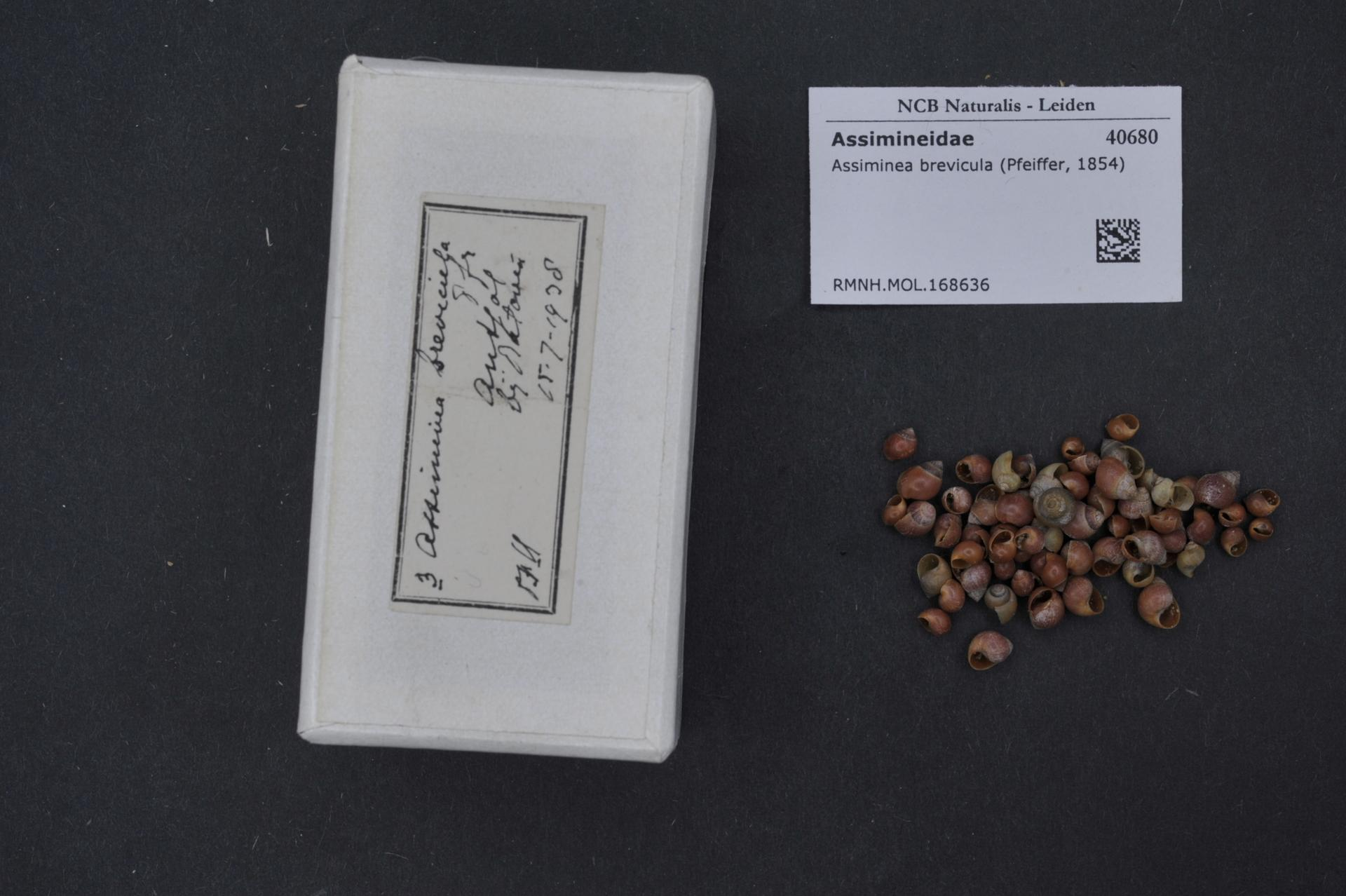
- Naturalis Biodiversity Center - RMNH.MOL.168636 1 - Assiminea brevicula (Pfeiffer, 1854) - Assimineidae - Mollusc shell.

Conservation status
- Least Concern (IUCN 3.1)

Scientific classification
- Kingdom: Animalia
- Phylum: Mollusca
- Class: Gastropoda
- Subclass: Caenogastropoda
- Order: Littorinimorpha
- Family: Assimineidae
- Genus: Optediceros
- Species: O. breviculum

Binomial name
- Optediceros breviculum (Pfeiffer, 1855)

Synonyms
- Assiminea australis Thiele, 1927 (non Petterd, 1889); Assiminea brevicula (Pfeiffer, 1855); Assiminea miniata Martens, 1866 (junior synonym); Assiminea rubella Blanford, 1867 (junior synonym); Hydrocena brevicula Pfeiffer, 1855 (original combination); Ovassiminea brevicula (L. Pfeiffer, 1854)

= Optediceros breviculum =

Species of gastropod

Optediceros breviculum, common name the red mangrove snail, is a species of small operculate snail, a freshwater or marine gastropod mollusc or micromollusc in the family Assimineidae.

== Distribution ==
The distribution of Optediceros breviculum includes:

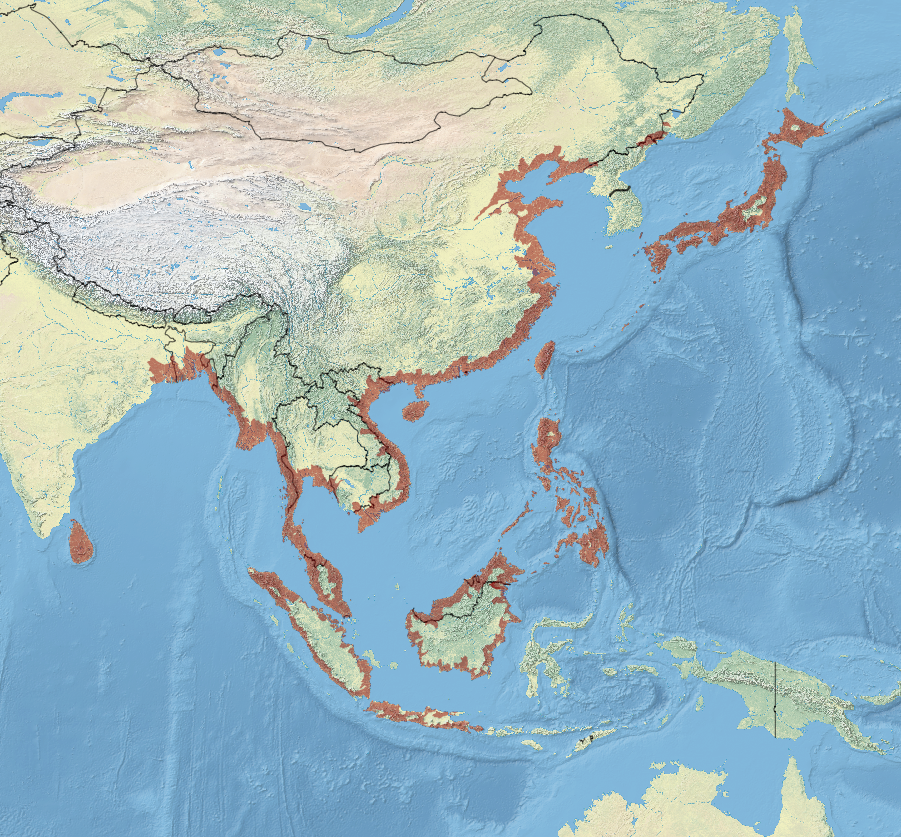
Distribution map of Optediceros breviculum.

- Bangladesh
- China and Hong Kong and Taiwan
- West Bengal in India
- Japan
- Malaysia
- Myanmar
- Philippines
- Singapore
- Sri Lanka
- Thailand
- Vietnam
