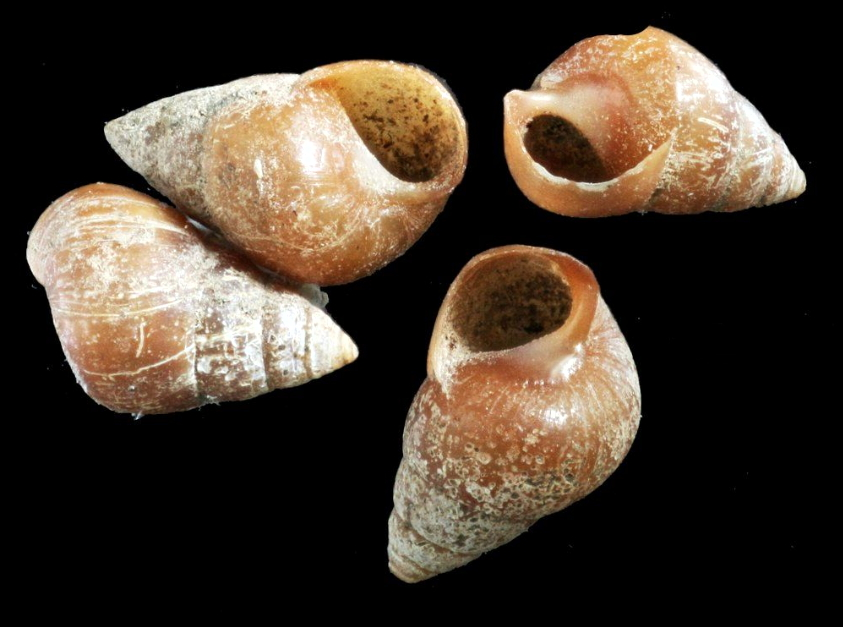
- Shell of Angustassiminea castanea (specimens at the Natural History Museum, Rotterdam)

Scientific classification
- Kingdom: Animalia
- Phylum: Mollusca
- Class: Gastropoda
- Subclass: Caenogastropoda
- Order: Littorinimorpha
- Family: Assimineidae
- Genus: Angustassiminea
- Species: A. castanea

Binomial name
- Angustassiminea castanea (Westerlund, 1883)

Synonyms
- List: Assiminea castanea Westerlund, 1883 (original combination); Assiminea castanea kushimotoensis Kuroda, 1958 (basionym); Assiminea kushimotoensis Kuroda, 1958

= Angustassiminea castanea =

Species of gastropod

Angustassiminea castanea is a species of small operculate snail, a terrestrial gastropod mollusk or micromollusk in the family Assimineidae.

== Description ==
The length of the shell attains 5 mm, its diameter 2.5 mm.

(Original description in Latin) The solid shell is imperforate, pyramidally conical and chestnut-colored. It is very shiny, finely striate and spirally lined. The spire is acute. The shell has seven rather convex whorls, which are disjoined by a thin suture. The body whorl is faintly angled, convex at the base, and it nearly occupies half the length of the shell. The aperture ispear-shaped and acute above, with a straight parietal wall. The peristome (margin) is straight, with a arched basal margin. The inner lip is slightly thickened and reflected above.

== Distribution ==
This marine species has been found off Japan.
