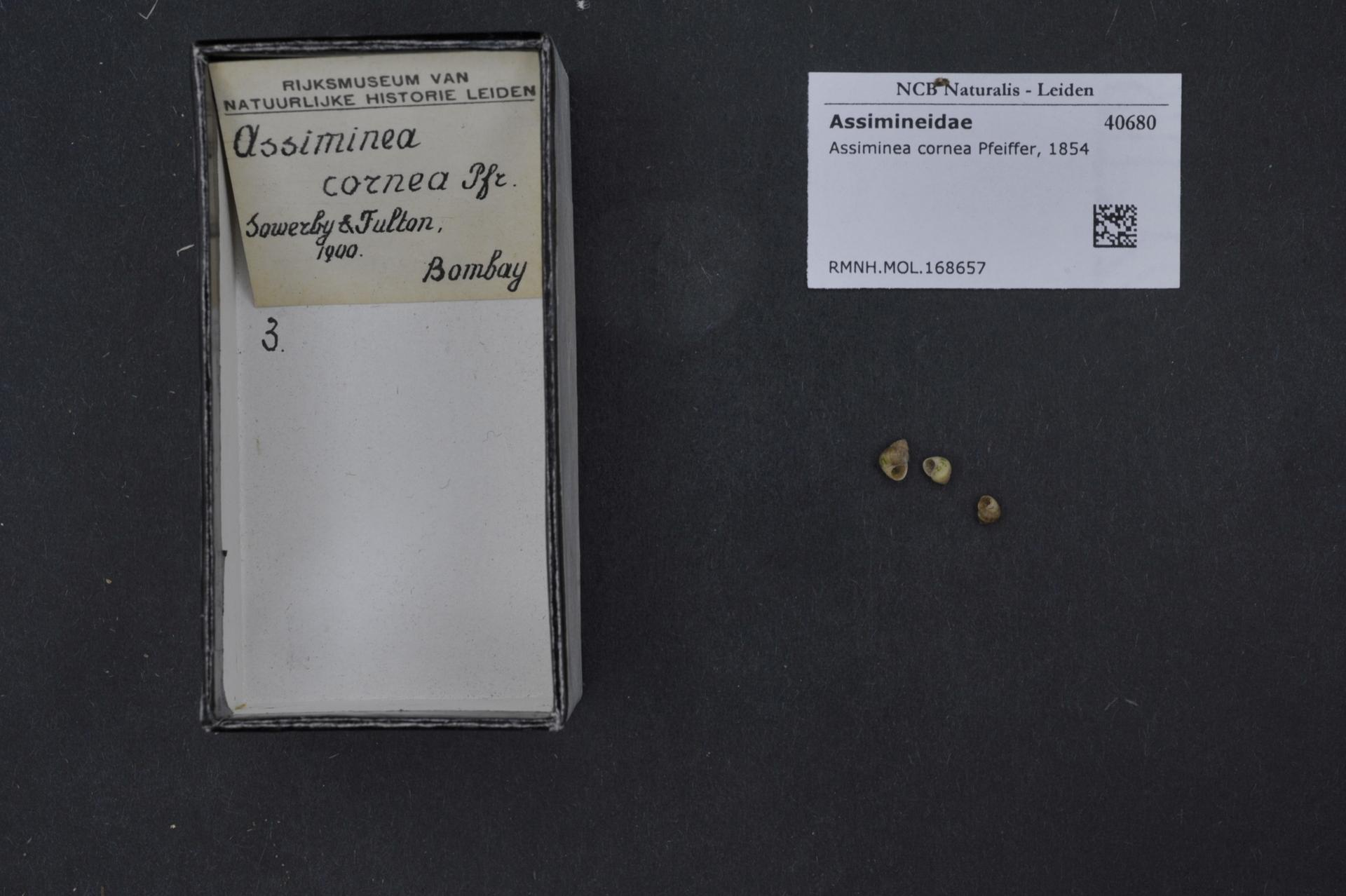
- Specimens of Assiminea cornea at Naturalis_Biodiversity_Center.

Scientific classification
- Kingdom: Animalia
- Phylum: Mollusca
- Class: Gastropoda
- Subclass: Caenogastropoda
- Order: Littorinimorpha
- Family: Assimineidae
- Genus: Assiminea
- Species: A. cornea

Binomial name
- Assiminea cornea (Leith, 1853)

Synonyms
- Assiminea fairbankii Frauenfeld, 1866 (unnecessary replacement name); Optediceros cornea Leith, 1853 original combination

= Assiminea cornea =

Species of gastropod

Assiminea cornea is a species of small operculate snail, a marine gastropod mollusk or micromollusk in the family Assimineidae.

This is a taxon inquirendum.

== Description ==
The length of the shell attains 4 mm, its diameter 3 mm.

(Original description in Latin) The shell is subobtectly perforate (sometimes imperforate), conoid-ovate, and horny in texture, smooth, with an oily shine, and is scarcely striate.

The spire is cone-shaped, with convex sides and an sharp apex. The impressed suture is not margined. It has six convex whorls, which increase gradually. The body whorl is rounded below and not keeled.

The aperture scarcely equals the height of the spire. It is suboval, oblique, and openly angled above. The peristome (margin) is straight, with a thin outer lip. The inner lip is thickened and somewhat expanded, covering the umbilicus partially or entirely.

The operculum is corneous, with few spirals, and has a subbasal, internal nucleus.

== Distribution ==
This species occurs in brackish waters off Mumbai, India; also off Taiwan.
