= Geoffrey Nevill (malacologist) =

English malacologist

- Born: 1843; England
- Died: 1885 (aged 41–42); Switzerland
- Occupation: malacologist

Geoffrey Nevill (October 5, 1843 – February 10, 1885) was an English malacologist who worked in the Indian Museum in Calcutta. He was an older brother of Hugh Nevill, a colonial civil servant in Ceylon.

== Early life ==
Geoffrey Nevill was born in Holloway in London in 1843, one of several sons of William Nevill, a manufacturer and amateur geologist. As the large family grew, they moved to Godalming, home of William's wife, Mary, who died in 1857, when her children were still young.

Geoffrey was educated at H.D. Heatley's school in Brighton and also spent some time in Bonn at the home of Dr F.H. Troschel, a professor of zoology. He took an early interest in molluscs and made collections from around his home, Langham, in Godalming and also from Germany. Most of these were later deposited in the Indian Museum at Calcutta.

== Travels around the Indian Ocean ==
Nevill then tried to work with his father but poor health led to being sent off to warmer climates and he travelled around South Africa, Mauritius, and Bourbon (Reunion), continuing his collections. He stayed in the Seychelles from 1868 for some time before going to Calcutta, where he worked at the Indian Museum. His interest was shared by his brother Hugh, who also collected and researched molluscs from India and Sri Lanka.

== Later Life ==
Geoffrey's health continued to decline and he returned to Europe, with some time spent in looking at the molluscs around Lake Como.

He died in Davos Platz, in Switzerland, in 1885.

== Legacy ==
Some of Geoffrey Nevill's collection is now held in the National Museum of Wales.

The World Register of Marine Species lists 51 marine species named by Nevill, many of which were named together with his brother as "Nevill & Nevill".

== Published works ==
Nevill's major work was the two part Hand list of Mollusca in the Indian Museum, Calcutta (1878-1884). Part 1 Part 2
