= Lake Rotomakariri =

Historic lake in the North Island of New Zealand

- Rotomakariri (Māori)
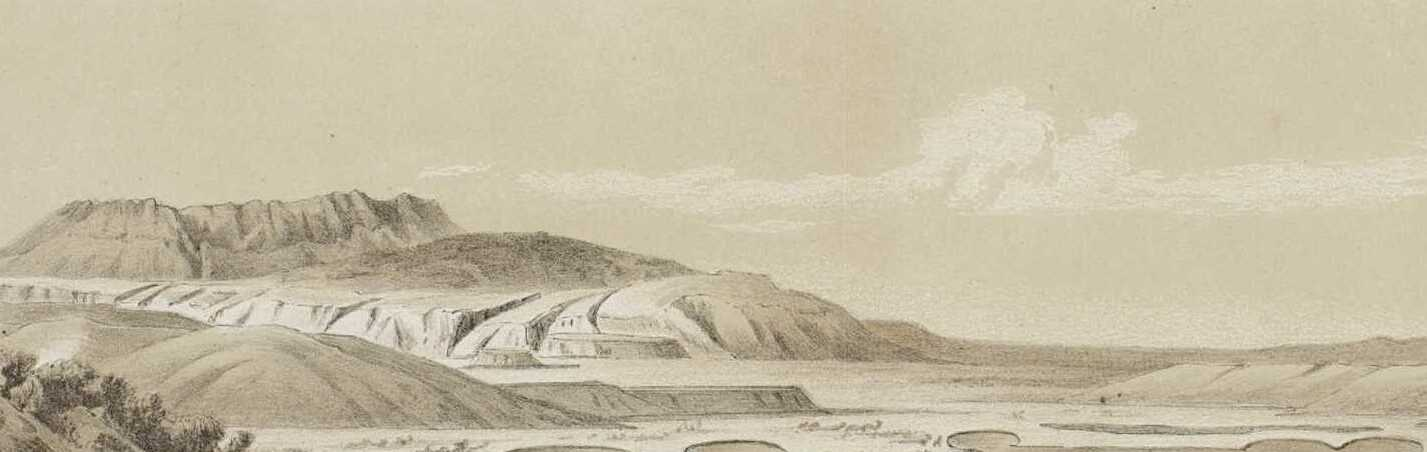
- 1863 drawing of Lake Rotomakariri by Ferdinand von Hochstetter

- Location within North Island
- Location: North Island
- Coordinates: 38°15′36″S 176°26′42″E
- Primary outflows: Awapurohe
- Basin countries: New Zealand
- Max. length: 0.54 km (0.34 mi)
- Max. width: 0.27 km (0.17 mi)

Lake Rotomakariri
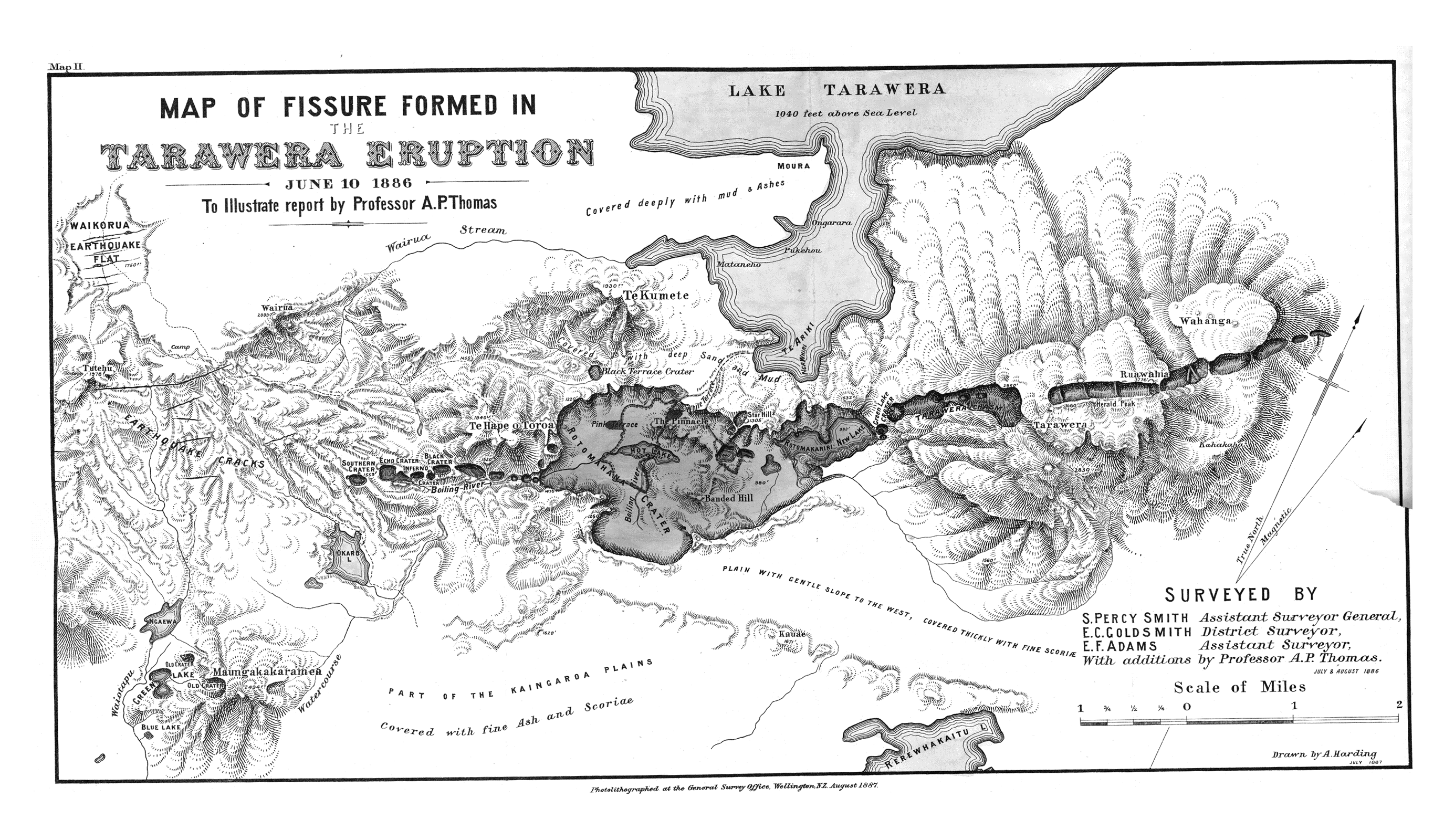
- The second, post eruption Lake Rotomakariri as of 1887/88 is labelled in black as "Rotomakariri New Lake". Annotations in white are to its west, the approximate location of the old Lake Rotomakariri. Further to the west are the locations of the old Lake Rotomahana and the start of a hot lake of the present Lake Rotomahana that now occupies most of the shaded crater.

Naming
- Etymology: Cold Lake

Geography
- Location: Bay of Plenty Region, New Zealand

Geology
- Mountain type: volcanic crater lake
- Rock type: basalt
- Volcanic zone: Taupō Volcanic Zone
- Last eruption: 1886

Lake Rotomakariri (From Māori: roto, meaning lake, and makariri, meaning cold) was a lake which formerly existed in the basin that is now occupied by Lake Rotomahana, in the Bay of Plenty region of New Zealand's North Island. The lake's name was in contrast to the nearby Lake Rotomahana, which prior to the 1886 eruption of Mount Tarawera, was a shallower warm water lake. Prior to this eruption, Lake Rotomakariri sat in a shallow basin surrounded by marshes, draining into Lake Tarawera by Awapurohe Creek and Rotomahana's outflow of Kaiwaka Stream. The eruption of Mount Tarawera initially destroyed Lake Rotomakariri and its lakeside village with the loss of 19 lives, though water entering the new crater gradually refilled Lake Rotomakariri after volcanic activity subsided. As water accumulated over the decade after the eruption, Lake Rotomakariri was absorbed by the larger Lake Rotomahana, which eventually rose to about 36–48 m (118–157 ft) above its pre-eruption level due to the previous outflow of the basin being blocked by ashfall.

== History ==
The Māori name Rotomakariri means cold water lake, and was first used by Hochstetter. This is in contrast to the larger warm lake Rotomahana just to its west on whose shores were the famous Pink and White Terraces that like all these features were destroyed or buried in the 1886 eruption. The only high quality survey of the lake area before this eruption had been done by Hochstetter in 1859, despite this area rapidly becoming a famous exotic geological tourist destination. High quality pictures of the then Lake Rotomahana and associated tourist attractions were widely available in Europe by 1875. The first Lake Rotomakariri was in a swampy vegetated location and the village of Waingōngongo on the lake shore was destroyed in the 1886 eruption with the loss of 19 lives.

The first official survey was done in 1887 after the eruption and this mapping showed a new cold water lake, also called Rotomakariri well to the east of the previous lake, in a new Rotomahana crater. Pictures of this new and temporary Lake Rotomakariri in a rather desolate landscape of the fresh eruptives exist. In due course Lake Rotomahana expanded again to ten times its previous area to occupy much of a crater produced by the 1886 eruption. This expansion has drowned the positions occupied by both the old and new Lake Rotomakariri, as the present Lake Rotomahana is 35–37 m (115–121 ft) above the old Lake Rotomahana according to one source, and 48 m (157 ft) according to another.

== Geography ==
The old Lake Rotomakariri had swampy surrounds and was to the east of the White Terrace and the old Lake Rotomahana, between Lake Rotomahana and Mount Tarawera. The shape of the lake varies from the original 1859 map in later versions of the same map, and it seems most likely that the old Lake Rotomakariri was an ovoid orientated north-south as this was how it was sketched in 1859 and immediately after the eruption. It drained via a creek called Awapurohe (Māori) into the Kaiwaka Stream. This stream drained mainly Lake Rotomahana and was quite swift, so canoes had to be poled up it from Lake Tarawera. It had a fall of 12 m (39 ft) in 1.6 km (0.99 mi). On the north-eastern lake shore was the village of Waingōngongo. The old Lake Rotomakariri was only 0.54 km (0.34 mi) long. There were several other small ponds or lakes to the east of Lake Rotomakariri towards Mount Tarawera, with Hochstetter showing an unnamed one to the east and to the south east a Lake Rangarua Tapu. European accounts gave a lake to the east, the name Green Lake, which, as many have had the same name in the locality over time, is almost meaningless. The present Green Lake to the east, occupying an explosion crater near the south-east shore of Lake Rotomahana did not exist prior to 1886. After the eruption which totally destroyed the old lake, a new lake formed in the most western part of the new Rotomahana crater, and this larger lake was called during its roughly decade of existence, the new Lake Rotomakariri.

== Geology ==
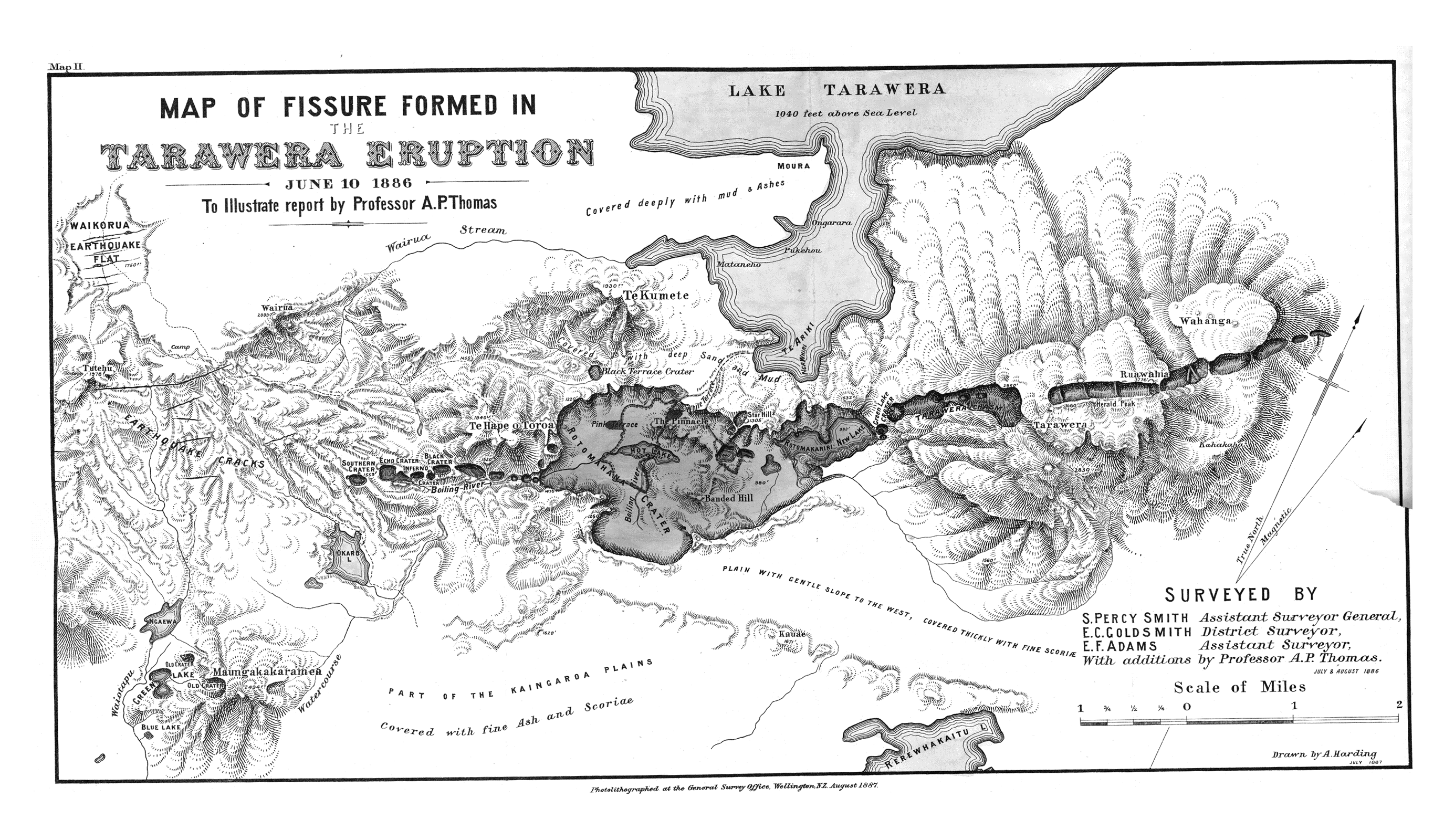
Map of Mount Tarawera in 1888 with pre 1886 eruption features

The area of the lake and the old Lake Rotomahana were volcanic as part of the Ōkataina Caldera and occupied an area that later became a vent of the 1886 eruption. There were some sinter cones near the lake. As the deepest part of the post eruption crater (and lake) is where the old Lake Rotomakariri was, part of the vent is likely to have been under it. However one interpretation of Hochstetter's original 1859 map's coordinates used to conjecture that some of the White Terrace might be buried rather than destroyed, would have put some of the old Lake Rotmakariri covered under a built up new Rotomahana crater rim today. Such an interpretation does not fit that well with the geological processes assumed to have occurred that erupted lake type mud deposits. The volcanics before the eruption were likely of rhyolite origin but after the eruption would have had new basaltic components. One or other of these lakes is the likely origin of shells of water-snails found, in a sample of fresh ash from Tauranga, and in an ash sample from Cape Runaway. The eruption accordingly likely both destroyed features, but could have covered them in eruptives which are meters thick. The depth of some of these eruptives is such that the present Lake Rotomahana has now no surface drainage to Lake Tarawera and is separated from it by a ridge rather than the former stream bed which all agree is buried by them. The mud from at least one of the two main old lakes was distributed to the northwest and for a period provided richer, healthier farmland as the basalt component contains more cobalt than cobalt poor rhyolite and this deficiency issue was not understood until many years later.
