= Georissa purchasi =

Scientific classification
- Kingdom: Animalia
- Phylum: Mollusca
- Class: Gastropoda
- Order: Cycloneritida
- Family: Hydrocenidae
- Genus: Georissa
- Species: G. purchasi

Binomial name
- Georissa purchasi (Pfeiffer, 1862)

Synonyms
- Hydrocena purchasi Pfeiffer, 1862 Omphalorissa purchasi (Pfeiffer, 1862)

Species of gastropod

Georissa purchasi is a species of small land snail, a terrestrial gastropod mollusc in the family Hydrocenidae.

The type specimen is stored in the Imperial Natural History Museum, Vienna.

== Description ==
The shell is minute, globosely conical, translucid, imperforate (no umbilicus. The sculpture consists of very fine growth-striae only. The colour is horny-fuscous. The epidermis is thin and shiny. The spire is conical, and rather obtuse. The protoconch is minute, strongly convex, smooth. The shell has 4-5 convex whorls. The last whorl is slightly greater than one-third of the height of the shell. The base is convex. The suture is impressed. The aperture is a little oblique, subcircular. The peristome is simple, straight. The columella is slightly concave, white. The inner lip is spread over the umbilicus, sealing it up more or less completely. The callus on the penultimate whorl unites the margins, and is conspicuous.

The width of the shell is 1 mm. The height of the shell is 2 mm.

The radula was described by Suter.

== Distribution ==
Georissa purchasi is found in New Zealand.

- North Island: Bay of Islands (Purchas, Hochstetter); Waro; Whangārei; vicinity of Auckland; Wairangi, Waikato Hunua Range; Mount Pirongia; Forty-mile Bush.
- South Island: Kenepuru Sound; Nelson; Wairoa Gorge; Greymouth; Riccarton Bush, near Christchurch.

== Habitat ==
This species is found in native bush in very moist situations, near creeks or swamps, under stones, rotten wood, etc.
