= Georissa elegans =

Conservation status
- Data Deficient (IUCN 2.3)

Scientific classification
- Kingdom: Animalia
- Phylum: Mollusca
- Class: Gastropoda
- Order: Cycloneritida
- Family: Hydrocenidae
- Genus: Georissa
- Species: G. elegans

Binomial name
- Georissa elegans Quadras & Möllendorff, 1894

Species of gastropod

Georissa elegans is a species of small cave snails, gastropod mollusks in the family Hydrocenidae of gastropod in the Hydrocenidae family.

== Distribution ==
The species is endemic to Guam.

== See also ==
List of land snails of the Mariana Islands
