= Georissa laevigata =

Conservation status
- Data Deficient (IUCN 2.3)

Scientific classification
- Kingdom: Animalia
- Phylum: Mollusca
- Class: Gastropoda
- Order: Cycloneritida
- Family: Hydrocenidae
- Genus: Georissa
- Species: G. laevigata

Binomial name
- Georissa laevigata Quadras & Möllendorff, 1894

Species of gastropod

Georissa laevigata is a species of a land snail, a minute cave snail, gastropod mollusk in the family Hydrocenidae.

This species is endemic to Guam.

== See also ==
List of land snails of the Mariana Islands
