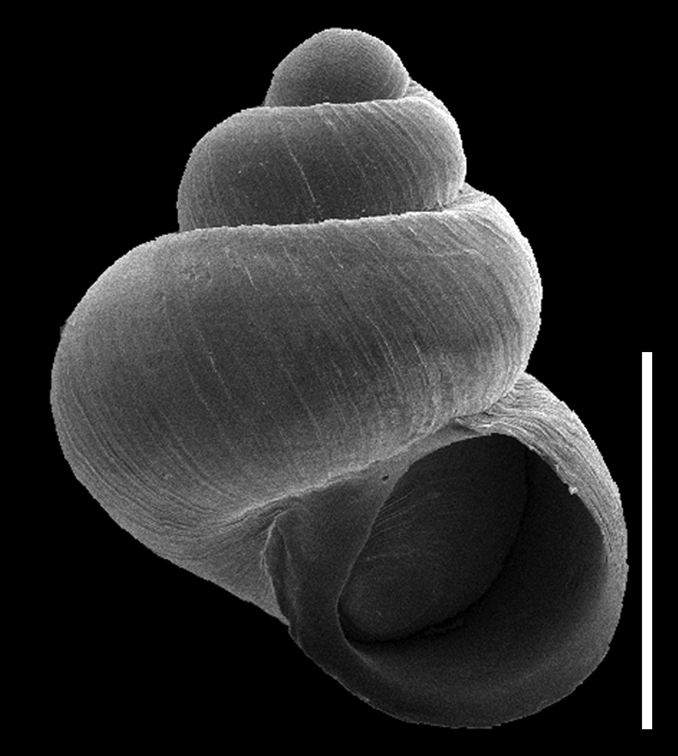
- Shell of Georissa filiasaulae.

Scientific classification
- Kingdom: Animalia
- Phylum: Mollusca
- Class: Gastropoda
- Order: Cycloneritida
- Family: Hydrocenidae
- Genus: Georissa
- Species: G. filiasaulae

Binomial name
- Georissa filiasaulae Haase & Schilthuizen, 2007

= Georissa filiasaulae =

Species of gastropod

Georissa filiasaulae is a species of a minute land snail that have an operculum, terrestrial gastropod mollusk in the family Hydrocenidae.

== Distribution ==
This species lives in Sabah, Malaysian Borneo.

== Ecology ==
It lives in caves.
