= Georissa biangulata =

Conservation status
- Data Deficient (IUCN 2.3)

Scientific classification
- Kingdom: Animalia
- Phylum: Mollusca
- Class: Gastropoda
- Order: Cycloneritida
- Family: Hydrocenidae
- Genus: Georissa
- Species: G. biangulata

Binomial name
- Georissa biangulata Quadras & Möllendorff, 1894

Species of gastropod

Georissa biangulata is a species of small cave snails that have an operculum. They are gastropod mollusks in the family Hydrocenidae.

== Distribution ==
This species is endemic to Guam.

== See also ==
List of land snails of the Mariana Islands
