= Georissa rufula =

Conservation status
- Data Deficient (IUCN 2.3)

Scientific classification
- Kingdom: Animalia
- Phylum: Mollusca
- Class: Gastropoda
- Order: Cycloneritida
- Family: Hydrocenidae
- Genus: Georissa
- Species: G. rufula

Binomial name
- Georissa rufula von Möllendorf, 1900

Species of gastropod

Georissa rufula is a species of small cave snails, gastropod mollusks in the family Hydrocenidae. This species is endemic to Micronesia.
