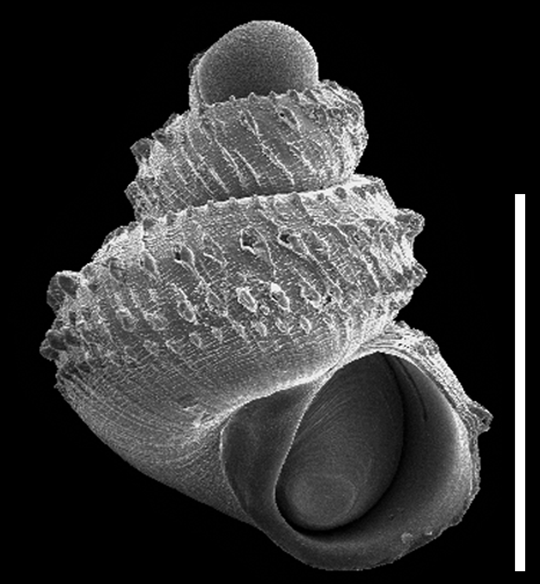
- Shell of Georissa saulae.

Scientific classification
- Domain: Eukaryota
- Kingdom: Animalia
- Phylum: Mollusca
- Class: Gastropoda
- Subclass: Neritimorpha
- Order: Cycloneritida
- Family: Hydrocenidae
- Genus: Georissa
- Species: G. saulae

Binomial name
- Georissa saulae (van Benthem-Jutting, 1966)

= Georissa saulae =

Species of gastropod

Georissa saulae is a species of a minute land snail that have an operculum, a terrestrial gastropod mollusk in the family Hydrocenidae.

== Distribution ==
This species lives in Sabah, Malaysian Borneo.
