= Georissa laseroni =

Conservation status
- Vulnerable (IUCN 2.3)

Scientific classification
- Kingdom: Animalia
- Phylum: Mollusca
- Class: Gastropoda
- Order: Cycloneritida
- Family: Hydrocenidae
- Genus: Georissa
- Species: G. laseroni

Binomial name
- Georissa laseroni (Iredale, 1937)

Species of gastropod

Georissa laseroni is a species of small cave snails that have an operculum, gastropod mollusks in the family Hydrocenidae.This species is endemic to Australia.
