= Waimangu =

Place in Rotorua, New Zealand

Waimangu is a place in Rotorua, New Zealand that got affected by the 1886 eruption of Mount Tarawera. It is known for Waimangu Volcanic Rift Valley. Waimangu is a thirty minutes drive from Rotorua.

== Climate ==
Climate data for Waimangu (Waiotapu Forest) (1971–2000 normals, extremes 1951–1986)
Month	Jan	Feb	Mar	Apr	May	Jun	Jul	Aug	Sep	Oct	Nov	Dec	Year
Record high °C (°F)	33.3 (91.9)	33.9 (93.0)	30.4 (86.7)	26.8 (80.2)	22.4 (72.3)	18.3 (64.9)	16.3 (61.3)	20.7 (69.3)	22.6 (72.7)	27.9 (82.2)	28.3 (82.9)	31.9 (89.4)	33.9 (93.0)
Mean daily maximum °C (°F)	22.6 (72.7)	22.6 (72.7)	20.3 (68.5)	17.3 (63.1)	14.1 (57.4)	11.4 (52.5)	11.0 (51.8)	12.0 (53.6)	13.9 (57.0)	16.3 (61.3)	18.4 (65.1)	20.5 (68.9)	16.7 (62.0)
Daily mean °C (°F)	16.8 (62.2)	16.8 (62.2)	14.9 (58.8)	12.0 (53.6)	9.0 (48.2)	6.9 (44.4)	6.4 (43.5)	7.2 (45.0)	9.2 (48.6)	11.3 (52.3)	13.2 (55.8)	15.1 (59.2)	11.6 (52.8)
Mean daily minimum °C (°F)	10.9 (51.6)	11.0 (51.8)	9.4 (48.9)	6.7 (44.1)	4.0 (39.2)	2.3 (36.1)	1.7 (35.1)	2.4 (36.3)	4.4 (39.9)	6.2 (43.2)	8.0 (46.4)	9.6 (49.3)	6.4 (43.5)
Record low °C (°F)	0.5 (32.9)	−0.4 (31.3)	−2.9 (26.8)	−6.7 (19.9)	−6.4 (20.5)	−6.3 (20.7)	−6.9 (19.6)	−6.7 (19.9)	−6.5 (20.3)	−5.5 (22.1)	−2.8 (27.0)	−1.1 (30.0)	−6.9 (19.6)
Average rainfall mm (inches)	89.4 (3.52)	97.1 (3.82)	104.4 (4.11)	111.4 (4.39)	111.2 (4.38)	135.7 (5.34)	139.7 (5.50)	125.8 (4.95)	129.8 (5.11)	114.2 (4.50)	90.1 (3.55)	127.6 (5.02)	1,376.4 (54.19)
Source: NIWA
