= Monterissa gowerensis =

Conservation status
- Vulnerable (IUCN 2.3)

Scientific classification
- Kingdom: Animalia
- Phylum: Mollusca
- Class: Gastropoda
- Subclass: Neritimorpha
- Order: Cycloneritida
- Family: Hydrocenidae
- Genus: Monterissa
- Species: M. gowerensis

Binomial name
- Monterissa gowerensis Iredale, 1944
- Location of Lord Howe Island

Species of gastropod

Monterissa gowerensis, also known as the Lord Howe microturban, is a species of small cave snails with an operculum, gastropod mollusks in the family Hydrocenidae.

== Description ==
The globosely turbinate shell of adult snails is 2.1–2.4 mm in height, with a diameter of 1.7–2 mm, with deeply impressed sutures. It is smooth, glossy and pale golden-brown in colour. The umbilicus is closed. The ovately lunate aperture has an operculum.

== Distribution and habitat ==
This terrestrial and freshwater species occurs on Australia's Lord Howe Island in the Tasman Sea, where it is rare and found mainly on the slopes of Mount Gower and Mount Lidgbird in leaf litter and cliff crevices.
