= Lake Rotomahana =

Lake in the North Island of New Zealand

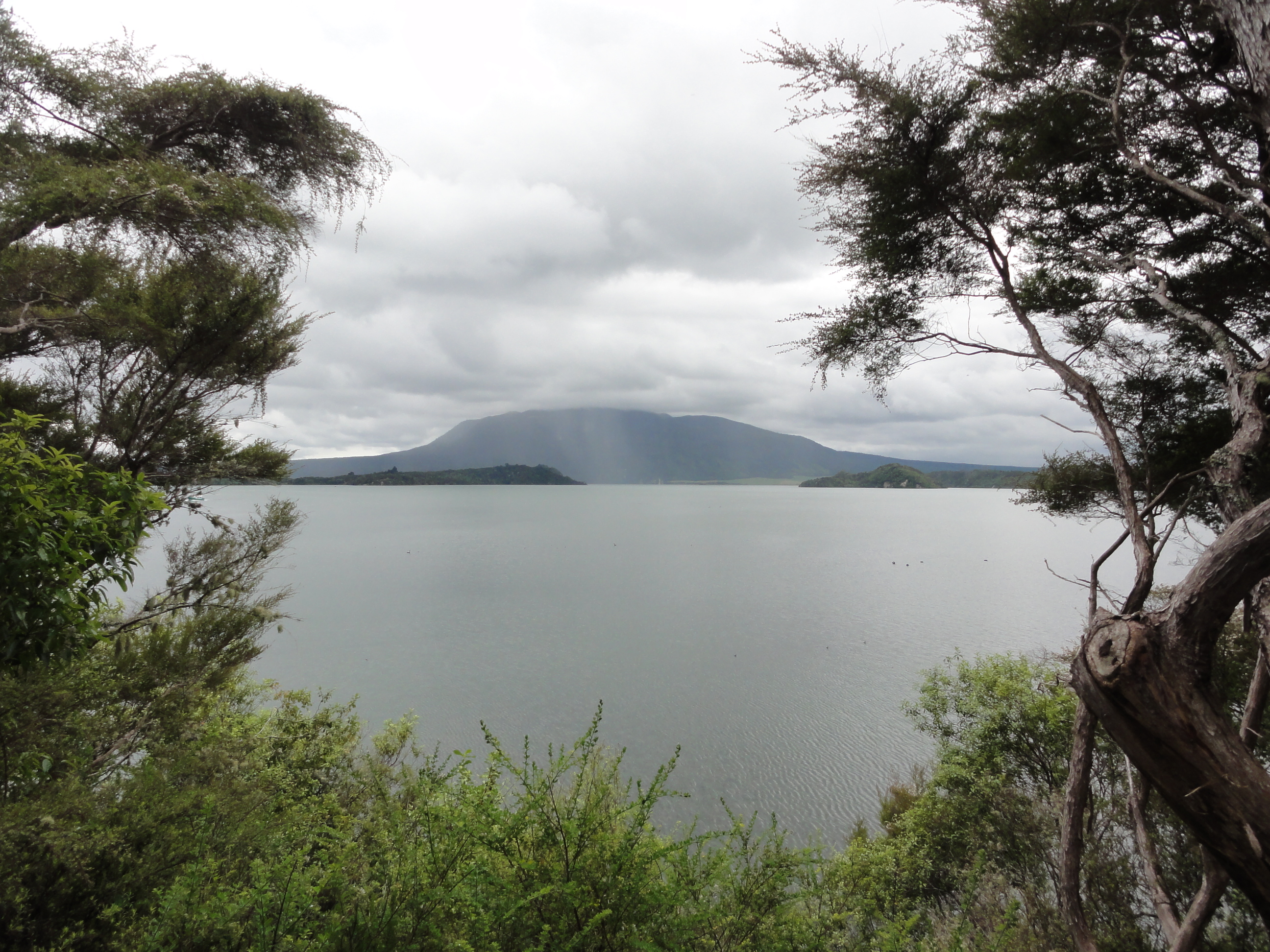
- Lake Rotomahana in 2011

- Location within New Zealand

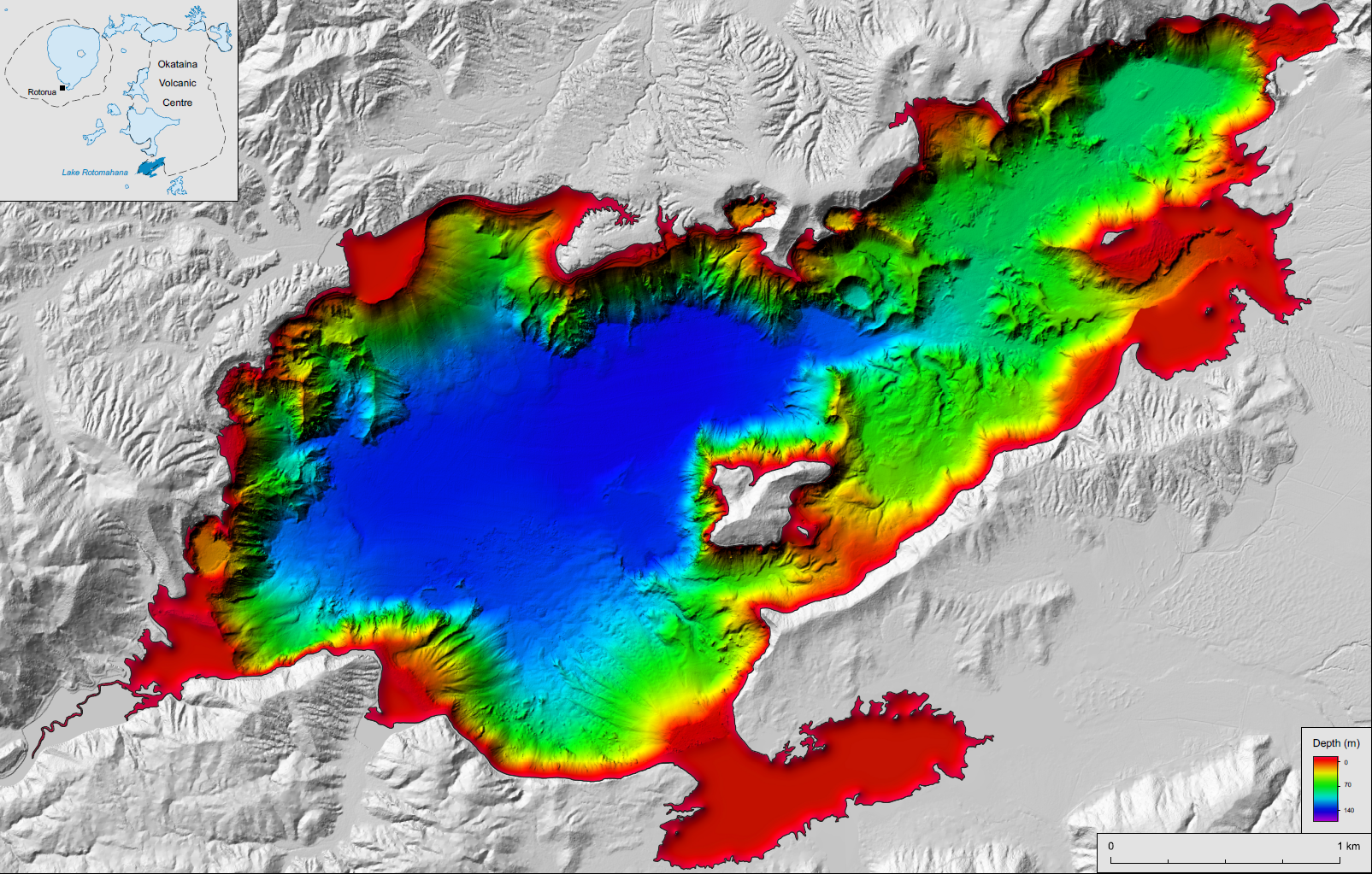
- Bathymetric map of Lake Rotomahana
- Location: North Island
- Group: Rotorua lakes
- Coordinates: 38°16′S 176°27′E
- Lake type: Volcanic crater lake
- Etymology: From Māori: Hot lake
- Part of: Ōkataina Caldera
- Primary inflows: Haumi Stream, Te Kauae Stream, Waimangu Stream, unnamed streams on Mount Tarawera, subsurface
- Primary outflows: subsurface of at least 1,125 L/s (39.7 cu ft/s).
- Catchment area: 83.3 km^{2} (32.2 sq mi)
- Basin countries: New Zealand
- First flooded: 1886
- Max. length: 6.2 km (3.9 mi)
- Max. width: 2.8 km (1.7 mi)
- Surface area: 8.9 km^{2} (3.4 sq mi)
- Average depth: 51 m (167 ft)
- Max. depth: 118 m (387 ft),
- Surface elevation: 338.7 m (1,111 ft)
- Islands: Pātītī Island

Lake Rotomahana is an 890-hectare (2,200-acre) lake in northern New Zealand, located 20 kilometres to the south-east of Rotorua. It is immediately south-west of the dormant volcano Mount Tarawera, and its geography was substantially altered by a major 1886 eruption of Mount Tarawera. Along with the mountain, it lies within the Ōkataina Caldera. It is the most recently formed larger natural lake in New Zealand, and the deepest in the Rotorua district.

== History ==
The New Zealand Ministry for Culture and Heritage gives a translation of "warm lake" for Rotomahana, following Hochstetter. and the surrounds of the lake had become world famous following its first European written description in 1843.

== Geology ==
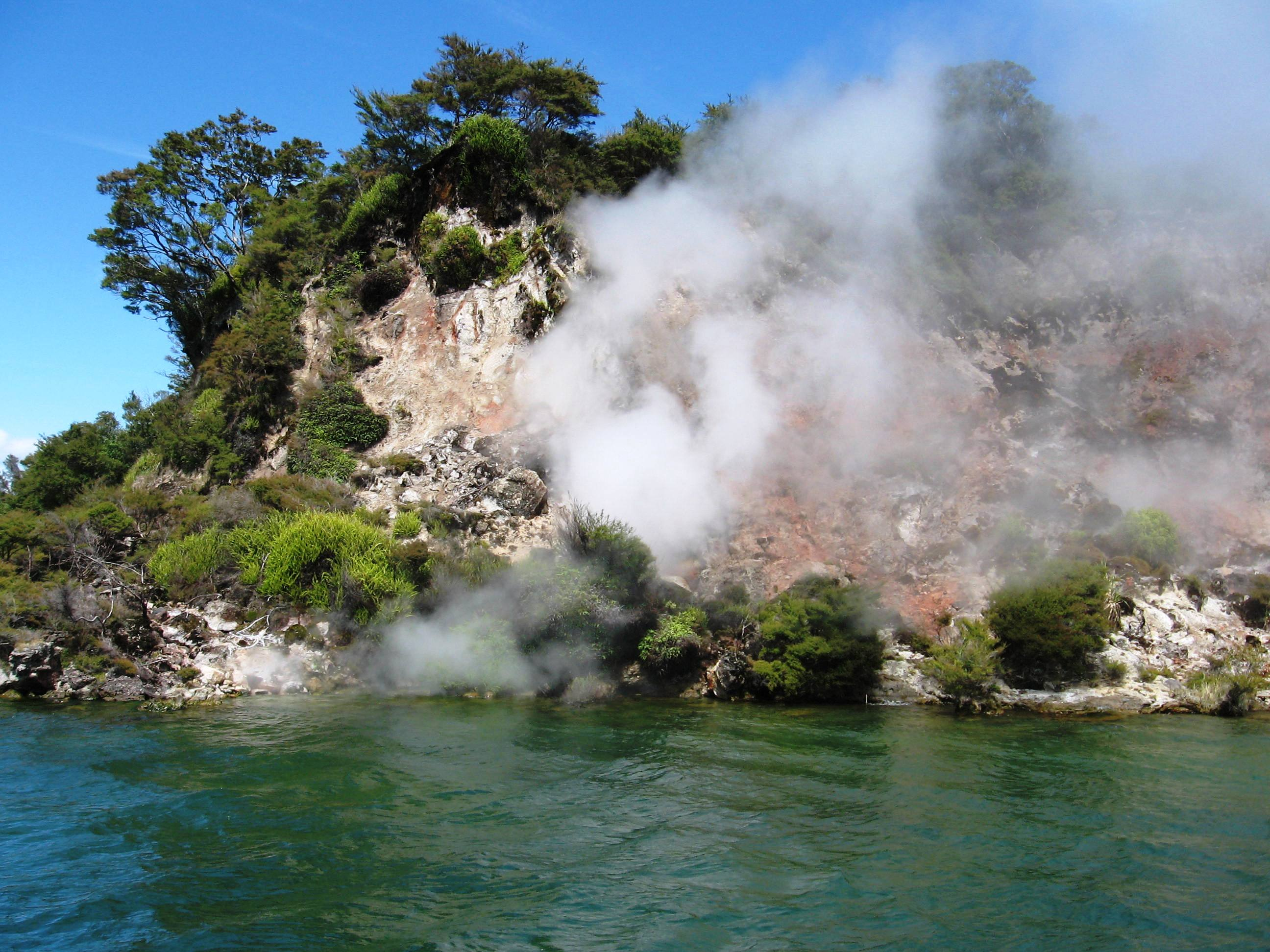
Steaming cliffs on the shore of Lake Rotomahana

Lake Rotomahana is one of the most studied lakes in New Zealand, occupying the southwestern portion of a 17-kilometre-long (11 mi) rift which formed during the 1886 eruption of Mount Tarawera. In the context of the geological discussion, a high standard hydrophonic survey took place in 2016 and the absolute measurements taken at this time, as lake level varies, are used for baseline. At this time the lake level was 340 m (1,120 ft), not the geographically mapped height of 337 m (1,106 ft), or the mean height of 338.7 m (1,111 ft). Lake Rotomahana has no natural surface outlet, and its water level varies by about one metre in response to rainfall and evaporation. There is now an engineered surface channel to maintain maximum lake level. Hydrogeologic models of the catchments in the Ōkataina Caldera predict that the Lake Rotomahana catchment is contributing subsurface to the Lake Tarawera catchment with an outflow, depending upon the size of the catchments so defined, of between 1,125–3,018 L/s (39.7–106.6 cu ft/s).

Before the 1886 eruption, two small lakes were present in the current lake's basin and perhaps six smaller ponds. The other lake was called Lake Rotomakariri. A hard rock, seismic reflection layer is defined near the old Lake Rotomahana at between 292 and 293 m (958 and 961 ft) above present sea level, which may be the base of the old basin. After the eruption a new Lake Rotomakariri to its east briefly existed before being incorporated by lake level rise into the present lake. The now lake floor was mostly dry when surveyed in the period 1886 to 1888 after the eruption, and it is possible to match these observations with current geolocated hydrophonic findings. High quality pictures of the old Lake Rotomahana and associated tourist attractions were widely available in Europe by 1875. Following the eruption, a number of craters filled over the course of 15 years to form today's Lake Rotomahana. As a result it is the most recently formed large natural lake in New Zealand, and at 118 m (387 ft) deep, the deepest in the Rotorua district. The former official depth was previously 112.4 m (369 ft), at a lower lake level and with less precise equipment. The lake bottom currently has up to 37 m (121 ft) of sediments, which means the Rotomahana crater bottom is 185 m (607 ft) above sea level.

The lake's northern shore lies close to the 39-metre (128 ft) lower Lake Tarawera, separated by less than 700 metres (2,300 ft) of terrain that is mostly material from the 1886 eruption. The original Lake Rotomahana has a slightly controversial level with respect to that of Lake Tarawera before 1886, partially because the eruption also changed the level of Lake Tarawera and there was a later lowering of Lake Tarawera's level around 1904.

The consensus range of difference with current water level between the old and current Lake Rotomahana appears to be 35–48 m (115–157 ft). (Note: These academic literature figures for the difference in water level between the old and present Lake Rotomahana differ mainly due to different assumptions and absolute baselines relative to sea level (a. s. l.). Because a recent 2021 claim of 60 m difference by a non-academic media source (Daly, Michael (17 March 2021) in Stuff) was identified, a sense check recalculation was done and the non academic source was unable to be verified up to August 2023, as it implies a 30 m odd change in relative lake levels from the present. The sense check calculation took the following into account. GPS data since it has been available shows that this area of the Taupō Rift is sinking relative to the coast and this has remained linear for the last 16 years at NZ Geonet station RGTA on Mount Tarawera. It seems reasonable to assume that the outlet of Lake Tarawera and the land around the present Rotomahama has sunk at a similar rate towards a. s. l.. If this is not the case, then this predicts that between 1885 and 2016 one of the lakes, could have sunk up to 1.9 m relative to the other. Perhaps the most likely deviation, looking at other nearby GNS stations, is only 0.5 m but for sense check purposes the biggest possible difference was allowed as GNS rate of change data was not available for one estimate. GNS datum rate of change at all Bay of Plenty sea side locations is less than a tenth of the value inland and sea level change due to ice cap melting is also not likely to be significant in the calculation since 1886. An historic assumption that the old Lake Rotomahana level was about 2 m (6 ft 7 in) higher than Lake Tarawera, is likely incorrect as the difference is documented to be 12 m (39 ft) in a pre 1886 source. So as we have a disagreement of about 10 m difference in lake levels at the time of the eruption from these two sources different assumptions. What we have left to know is the relative change in lake level of Lake Tarawera. In 2005 Hodgson and Nairn did this working forwards from 1886. The relative change data for Lake Tarawera, is known, as initially its outlet was blocked by the 1886 eruption with the lake level rising by 12.8 m (42 ft). The 1904 volcanic debris dam break dropped the level by 3.35 m (11.0 ft) and since then there has been minimal change. So we know that the 1886 level was 9 m (30 ft) lower than the current Lake Tarawera level but to this must add 1.9 m (6 ft 3 in) so the 1886 level was 7.1 m (23 ft) lower than present. The current lake level as of 2016 was 340 m (1,120 ft) of Lake Rotomahana, with a known difference in current lake levels between Tarawera and Rotomahana of 39 m (128 ft). The sense check suggests the relative difference of lake levels historically as of 1886 was similar to this current difference and is within 5 m (16 ft) of the present value but the absolute heights above a.s.l. could have changed in over 100 years by about 2 m (6 ft 7 in) if current measured subsidence rates in other areas of the Taupō Rift apply for the whole period.)

The original lake formed in an area of mostly rhyolytic eruptives and would have also been associated with lake sediments deposited at least in the time since the 1314 ± 12 CE Kaharoa eruption of Mount Tarawera. The eruption process which was basaltic deposited muddy material widely and many metres thick especially to the northeast. One or other of the lakes that existed before the eruption is the likely origin of shells of water-snails found, in a sample of fresh ash from Tauranga, and in an ash sample from Cape Runaway. Essentially the new crater evacuated material to a depth of at least 60 m (200 ft) where the pre-eruption lakes had been and possibly as much as 80 m (260 ft) in places.

The current average conductive heat flux is at least three times higher than that either beneath Lake Rotorua or Lake Taupō. The latest determination is 47 MW. The hydrothermal system that feeds still active geothermal features on the lake shore and had fed the Pink Terraces at the western side of the lake, has a heat flux of 21.3 W/m^{2}. There is an area southwest of Pātītī Island that has a heat flux averaging 13 W/m^{2} that appears to be in a lake floor crater created in 1886.

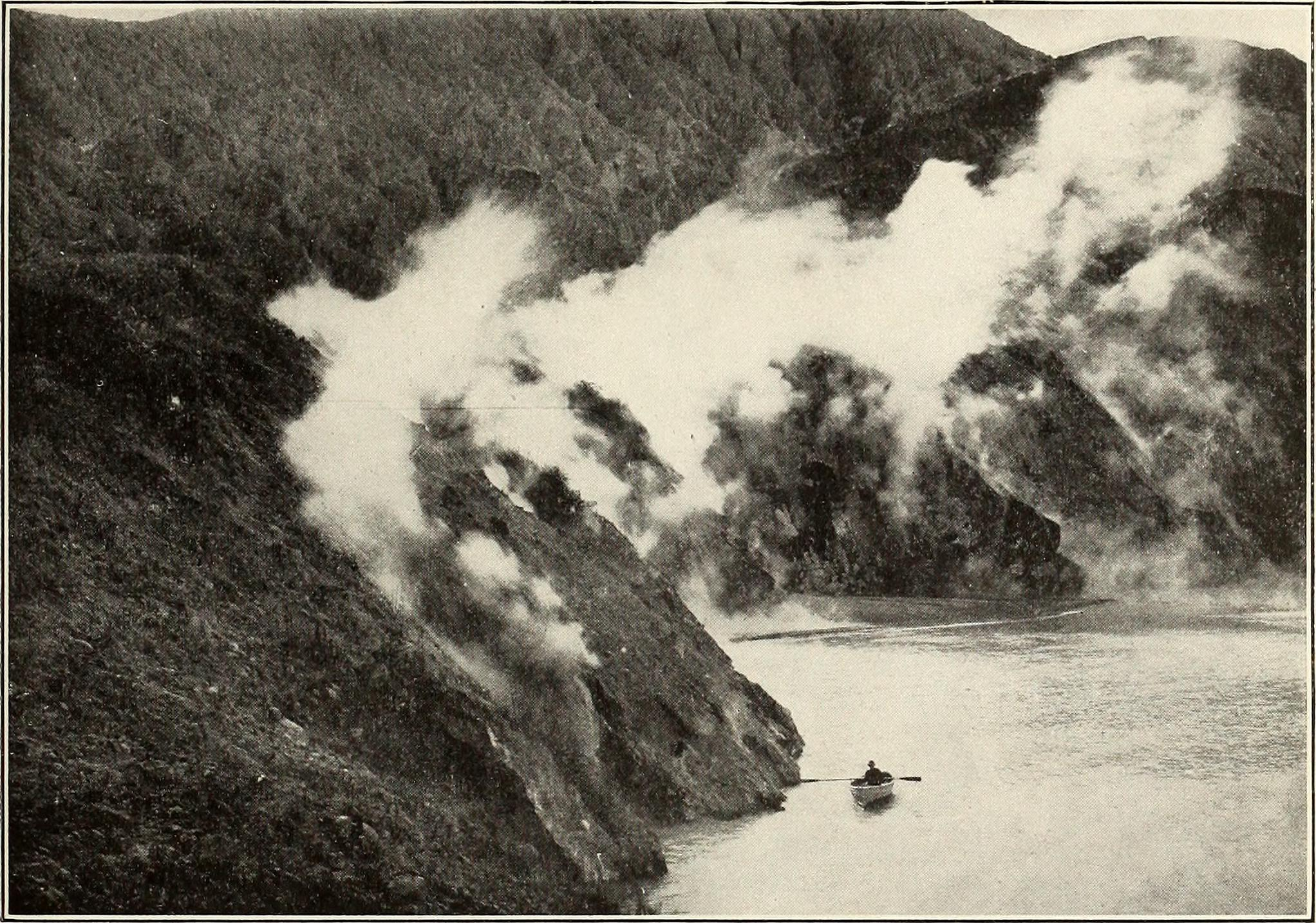
Steaming cliffs on shore of Lake Rotomahana (photograph taken sometime before April 1908)

== Ecology ==
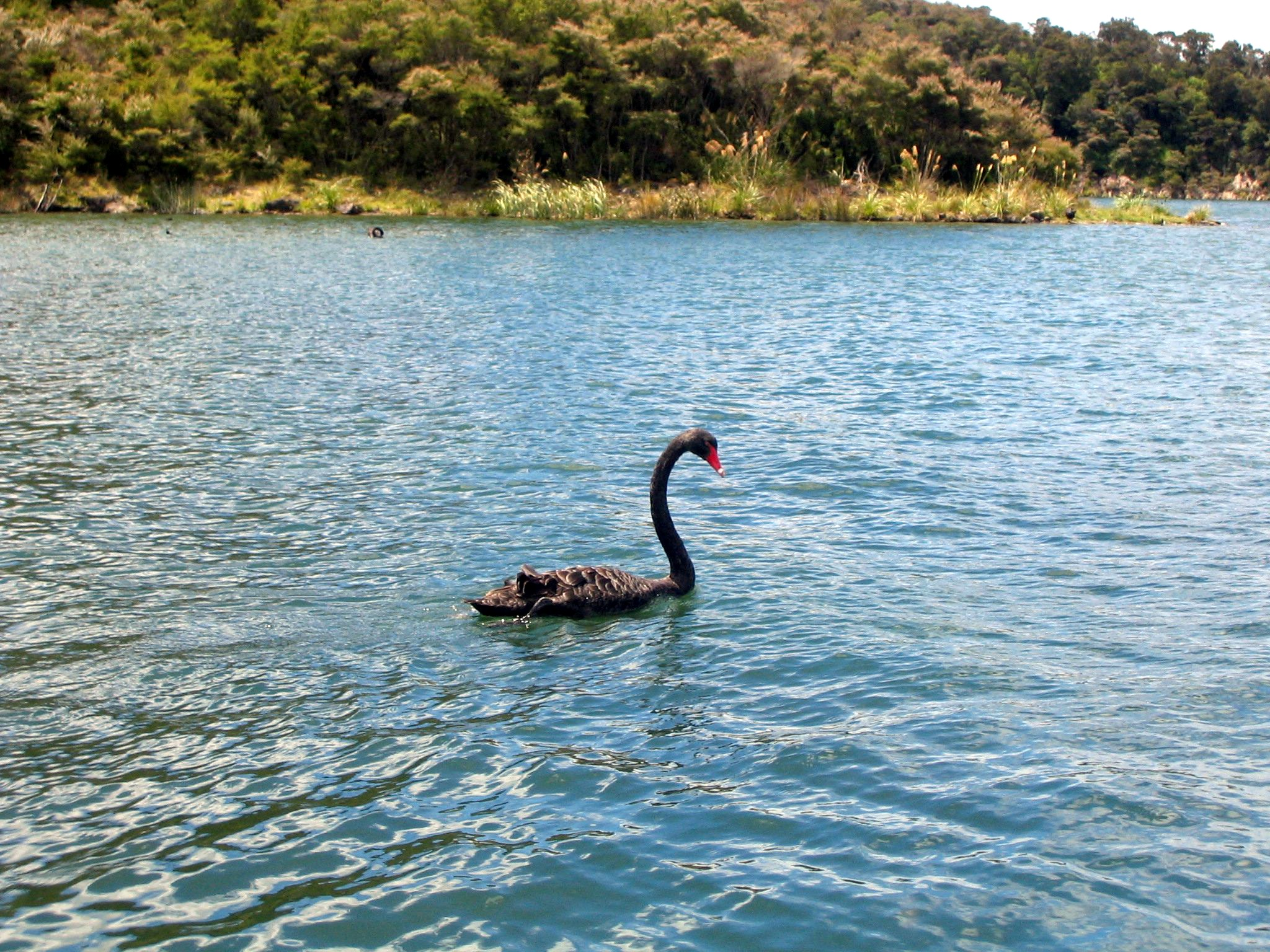
Black swan on Lake Rotomahana

The lake is a wildlife refuge (and was one prior to first contact), with all hunting of birds prohibited. A healthy population of black swan inhabits the lake, and there are efforts underway to ensure the lake's largest island, Pātītī Island, is kept pest-free. Recent research confirms Pātītī Island is the closest surviving pre-eruption feature on the old lake, i.e. to survive the 1886 eruption, being formerly known as Rangipakaru Hill. There is no public access to the lake, save for the Tourist Track, overland from Lake Tarawera.

A boat cruise on the lake, visiting hydrothermal features on the lake's shore, is available as an additional extra from the Waimangu Volcanic Valley tourism operation.

The nitrogen load on the lake is stable, but has high trophic level index inflow from the Okaro catchment via the Haumi Stream.

=== Water Inflows ===
Inflows
Source	Details	Mean inflow to lake
Haumi Stream	At lake	168 L/s (5.9 cu ft/s)
-	Haumi Stream above Watmangu Stream confluence	110 L/s (3.9 cu ft/s)
-	Watmangu Stream	58 L/s (2.0 cu ft/s)
Te Kauae Stream	Ash Pit Rd Ford	166 L/s (5.9 cu ft/s)
Putunoa Stream	Farm Track Culvert	26 L/s (0.92 cu ft/s)
Rotomahana Stream	at swamp	56 L/s (2.0 cu ft/s)
Catchment Inflow	from precipitation	3,174 L/s (112.1 cu ft/s)
Catchment Inflow	estimated subsurface other catchments	30 L/s (1.1 cu ft/s)

== Pink and White Terraces ==
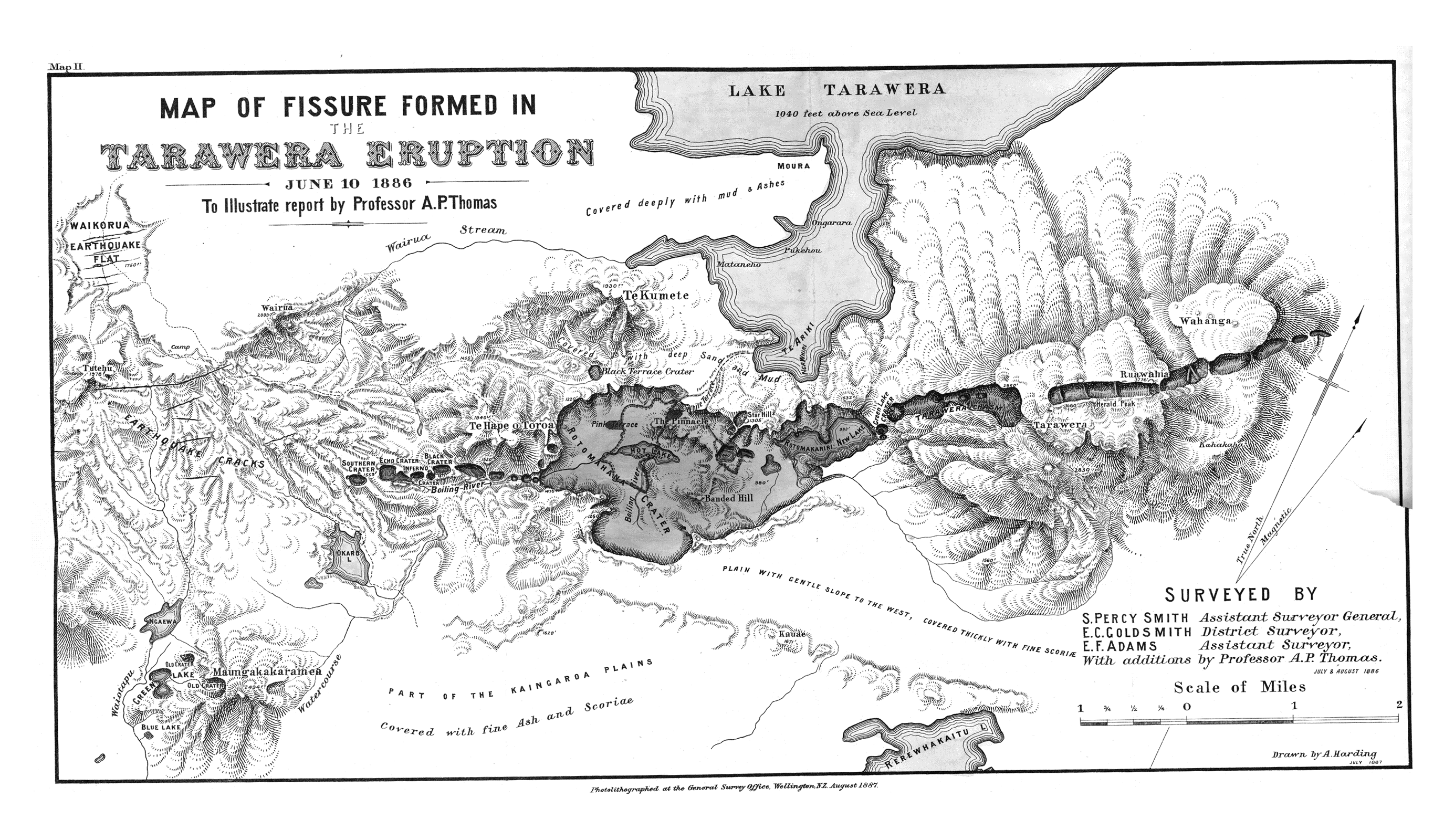
The current, post eruption Lake Rotomahana occupies almost all of the gray shaded 1886 eruption crater as mapped in 1887/88. This diagram also shows with white annotations the approximate location of the old Lake Rotomahana and to its east the old Lake Rotomakariri. Water had commenced filling the crater, especially at its eastern end where a new lake Rotomakariri had come into existence by the time of the survey.

The Pink and White Terraces were a natural wonder on the shores of the lake before the 1886 eruption. They were considered to be the eighth wonder of the natural world and were New Zealand's most famous tourist attraction during the 19th century, from c. 1870-1886; but were buried or destroyed by the eruption.

Scientists thought they had rediscovered the lower tiers of the Pink and White Terraces on the lake bed at a depth of 60 metres (200 ft) in 2011. More recent research reports over 2016-2020 suggest the upper parts of both terraces lie on land and may therefore be accessed for physical evidence the terraces or sections of them survived in their original locations.

The 2017- research relied on the journals of German-Austrian geologist Ferdinand von Hochstetter, who visited the lake in 1859. Hochstetter's journals are the only known survey of the terraces before the eruption. Using Hochstetter's field diaries and compass data, a team of New Zealand researchers identified a location where they believe the Pink and White Terraces lie preserved at a depth of 10–15 metres (32–49 ft). The researchers were hoping to raise funds for a full survey of the area, but any work would first have to be approved by the local Māori tribe on whose sacred ancestral land the Pink and White Terraces are situated. Ground penetrating radar searches were undertaken in 2017 but the equipment failed to penetrate sufficiently deeply to show whether or not the terraces lay in their surveyed locations. Later Hochstetter survey research refined the Pink, Black and White Terrace locations. The issue of whether any of the terraces remain continues to remain unresolved.

== Green Lake ==
A small lake, Green Lake, lies close to the eastern shore of Lake Rotomahana at 38°15′00″S 176°28′18″E. It should not be confused by the much larger Lake Rotokākahi (Green Lake), which lies to the west of Rotomahana.

Green Lake was formed in a roughly circular crater and is some 100 metres in diameter. It takes its name from its distinctive colour, which is considerably greener and darker than that of Rotomahana. The lake formed after the 1886 eruption of Mount Tarawera. Prior to the eruption, a small (~12m diameter) lakelet also known as Green Lake (Lake Rotopounamu) had existed to the north of Lake Rotomahana in Waikanapanapa Valley but this was exhumed during the Tarawera eruption. After the eruption, water flowed into the new Green Lake crater, which was given the same name as the older lake. Other pre-eruption lakes and lakelets about Lake Rotomahana included Lakes Rotomakariri, Rangipakaru, Ruahoata and Wairake. The shape, location and orientation of Lake Makariri in Cole, 1970 (cited herein) is incorrect. He followed August Petermann's flawed map. Hochstetter shows the lake axis lay at an azimuth of 355 degrees. Recent research into these lake levels gave insight into changes at Lake Rotomahana in the lead-up to the eruption.

== The Sunken Totara Forest Myth ==
One forgotten lake feature is the semi-mythical sunken totara forest of Lake Rotomahana. In 2016 when a scuba team first dove the lake, they found no evidence of a sunken forest or trees, as reported by Fitzgerald off Moura. While there were forests over the pre-eruption Mt Tarawera, Tōtara trees were scattered and only recorded over the western and southern mountain flanks. Given Tōtara tree groves could hardly appear in the eruption craters, it appears likely any sunken forest lies in the north-east corner of the new lake.

The placement of the sunken forest would have been post-eruption, via the mechanism described by the US Forest Service after the Mt. St. Helens eruption. The trees were uprooted in the eruption and propelled into the crater during or after the eruption. As the new lake formed over decades, the trunks floated for a time, then tipped vertically; later descending into a vertical lie, and became embedded into the lake floor coming to resemble a sunken forest. Hence, another myth about the Tarawera eruption and Lake Rotomahana is explained.
