= Monterissa =

Scientific classification
- Kingdom: Animalia
- Phylum: Mollusca
- Class: Gastropoda
- Order: Cycloneritida
- Family: Hydrocenidae
- Genus: Monterissa; Iredale, 1944

Genus of gastropods

Monterissa is a genus of minute cave snails with an operculum, gastropod mollusks in the family Hydrocenidae.

== Species ==
Species within the genus Monterissa include:

- Monterissa gowerensis
