= Hydrocena =

- Hydrocena cattaroensis

Scientific classification
- Kingdom: Animalia
- Phylum: Mollusca
- Class: Gastropoda
- Order: Cycloneritida
- Family: Hydrocenidae
- Genus: Hydrocena; Küster, 1844

Genus of snails

Hydrocena is a genus of gastropods belonging to the family Hydrocenidae.

The genus has almost cosmopolitan distribution.

Species:

- Hydrocena atavina Stache, 1889
- Hydrocena bridgesi L.Pfeiffer, 1855
- Hydrocena cattaroensis (L.Pfeiffer, 1841)
- Hydrocena cerea L.Pfeiffer, 1857
- Hydrocena cornea L.Pfeiffer, 1855
- Hydrocena diaphana Gassies, 1863
- Hydrocena dubiosa (C.B.Adams, 1851)
- Hydrocena dubrueiliana (Paladilhe, 1873)
- Hydrocena exserta L.Pfeiffer, 1855
- Hydrocena gutta Shuttleworth, 1852
- Hydrocena japonica E.von Martens, 1886
- Hydrocena kenyana Connolly, 1929
- Hydrocena lirata Morelet, 1862
- Hydrocena moncuccoensis Harzhauser, Neubauer & Esu, 2015
- Hydrocena navigatorum L.Pfeiffer, 1857
- Hydrocena noticola Benson, 1856
- Hydrocena obtusa L.Pfeiffer, 1855
- Hydrocena praecursor T.Yu & Neubauer, 2021
- Hydrocena puisseguri Schlickum, 1975
- Hydrocena pyramis L.Pfeiffer, 1855
- Hydrocena rara (O.Boettger, 1884)
- Hydrocena solidula L.Pfeiffer, 1855
- Hydrocena spiralis Wiktor, 1998
- Hydrocena tanzaniensis Verdcourt, 2004
- Hydrocena trolli Schlickum, 1979
- Hydrocena turbinata Morelet, 1865
