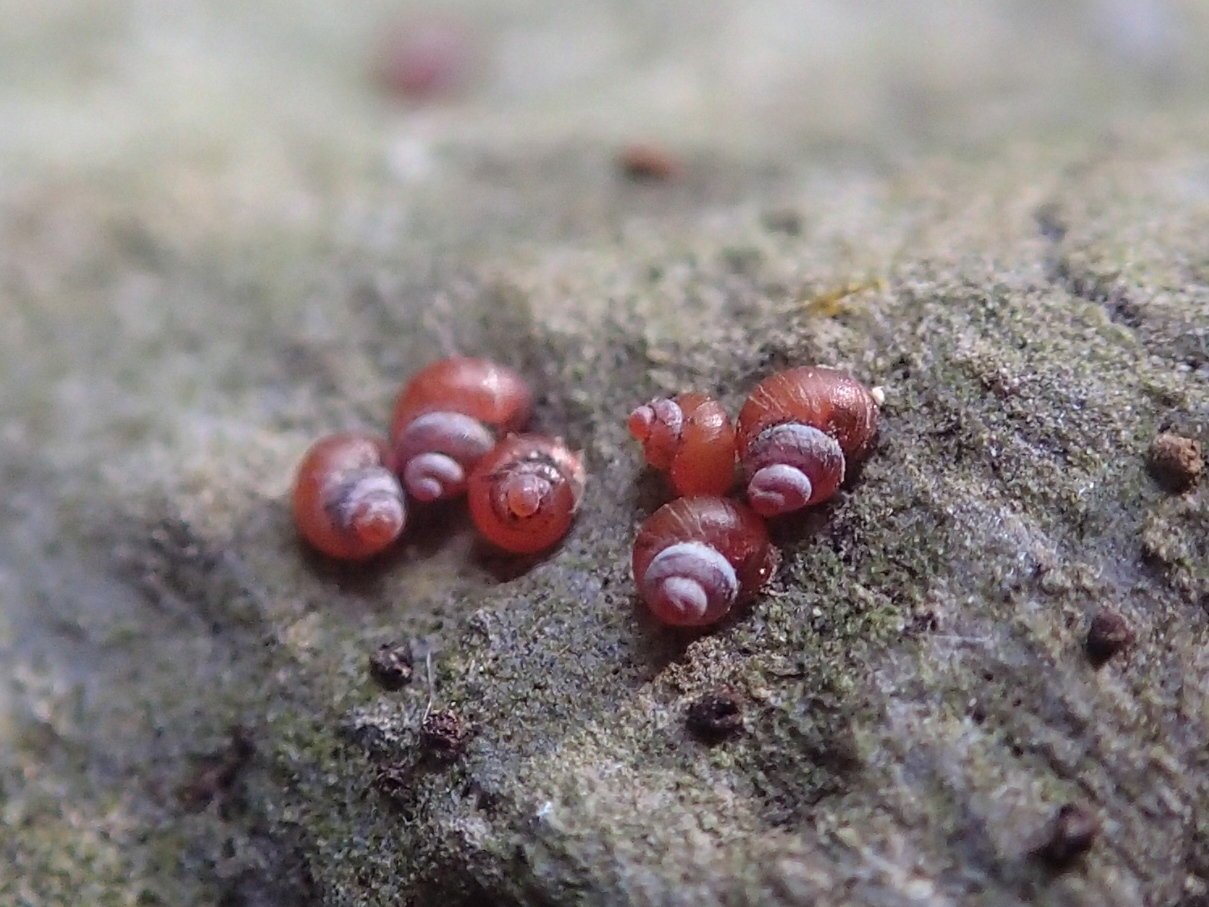
- Georissa shikokuensis

Scientific classification
- Kingdom: Animalia
- Phylum: Mollusca
- Class: Gastropoda
- Order: Cycloneritida
- Family: Hydrocenidae
- Genus: Georissa; Blanford, 1864

Synonyms
- Chondrella Pease, 1871 (original rank); Georissa (Chondrella) Pease, 1871 alternative representation; Georissa (Georissa) W. T. Blanford, 1864 alternative representation; Georissa (Georissopsis) Pilsbry & Hirase, 1908 alternative representation; Hydrocena (Georissa) W. T. Blanford, 1864; Omphalorissa Wenz, 1938; Petrorissa Habe, 1958

= Georissa =

Genus of gastropods

Georissa is a genus of minute land snails, terrestrial gastropod mollusks in the family Hydrocenidae.

== Description ==
(Original description in Latin) The shell is imperforate or scarcely perforate. It is very small, and conical, displaying an amber-colored or reddish hue. It is usually spirally grooved or striated.

The operculum appears semi-oval, lacking any trace of spiral structure, and presents eccentric striations. It is testaceous (shell-like) and transparent.

The animal is small and is equipped with hemispherical lobes in place of tentacles. Its eyes are normal, and its foot is short and rounded.

== Distribution ==
Although the species are best known for living on the surface of limestone rocks, they are often also found in and on the vegetation and on non-calcareous rocks. One species, Georissa filiasaulae, is cavernicolous. It is only known from two caves in the Sepulut area of Sabah, Malaysian Borneo, where its above-ground sister species, Georissa saulae, inhabits the rocks outside of the cave, and is connected to the cave snail via narrow zones of hybridization at the cave entrances. Possibly, G. filiasaulae has evolved without ever having been fully separated from its ancestor, a process known as speciation-with-gene-flow.

== Species ==
Species within the genus Georissa include:

- Georissa anyiensis Khalik, Hendriks, Vermeulen & Schilthuizen, 2018
- Georissa bangueyensis E. A. Smith, 1895
- Georissa bauensis Khalik, Hendriks, Vermeulen & Schilthuizen, 2018
- Georissa biangulata Quadras & Möllendorff, 1894
- Georissa borneensis E. A. Smith, 1895
- Georissa elegans Quadras & Möllendorff, 1894
- Georissa everetti E. A. Smith, 1895
- Georissa filiasaulae Haase & Schilthuizen, 2007
- Georissa gomantongensis E.A. Smith, 1894
- Georissa hadra Thompson & Dance, 1983
- Georissa hosei Godwin-Austen, 1889
- Georissa japonica Pilsbry, 1900
- Georissa kinabatanganensis Khalik, Hendriks, Vermeulen & Schilthuizen, 2018
- Georissa kobelti Gredler, 1902
- Georissa laevigata Quadras & Möllendorff, 1894
- Georissa laseroni (Iredale, 1937)
- Georissa mawsmaiensis Das & Aravind, 2021
- Georissa monterosatiana Godwin-Austen & Neville, 1879
- Georissa muluensis Khalik, Hendriks, Vermeulen & Schilthuizen, 2018
- Georissa niahensis Godwin-Austen, 1889
- Georissa pachysoma Vermeulen & Junau, 2007
- Georissa purchasi
- Georissa pyrrhoderma Thompson & Dance 1983
- Georissa pyxis (Benson, 1856) - type species of the genus Georissa
- Georissa rufula von Möllendorf, 1900
- Georissa saulae (van Benthem-Jutting, 1966)
- Georissa scalinella (van Benthem-Jutting, 1966)
- Georissa semisculpta
- Georissa sepulutensis Khalik, Hendriks, Vermeulen & Schilthuizen, 2018
- Georissa shikokuensis Amano, 1939
- Georissa silaburensis Khalik, Hendriks, Vermeulen & Schilthuizen, 2018
- Georissa similis E.A. Smith, 1894
- Georissa vesta Thompson & Dance, 1983
- Georissa williamsi Godwin-Austen, 1889 (including Georissa hungerfordi)
