= 1886 eruption of Mount Tarawera =

Volcanic eruption in New Zealand

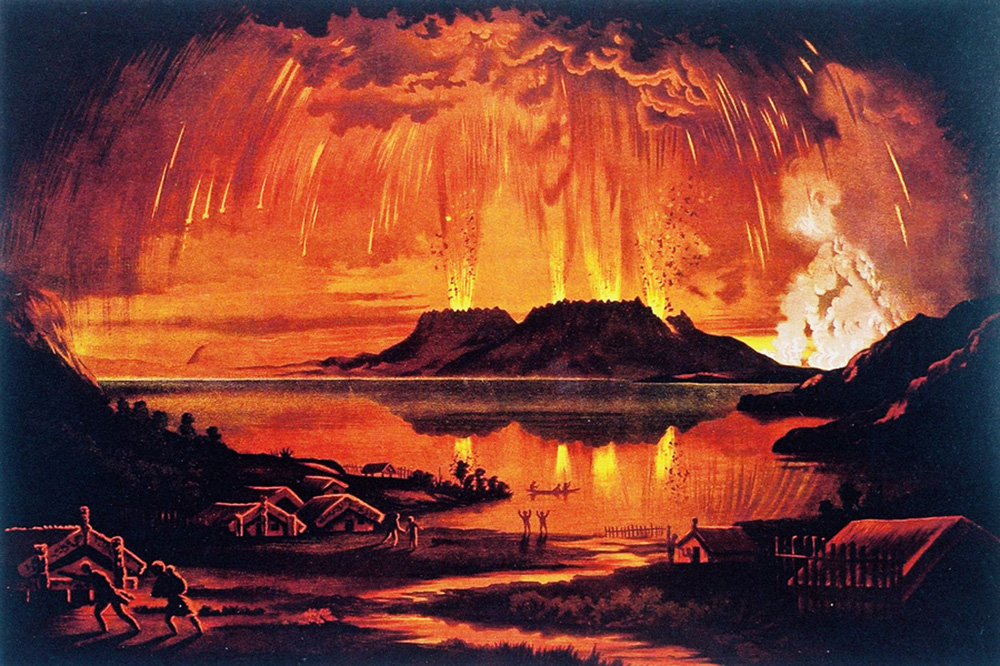
- Mount Tarawera in Eruption by Charles Blomfield
- Volcano: Mount Tarawera
- Start date: 10 June 1886
- Start time: 2:00 a.m.
- End date: 10 June 1886
- End time: 8:00 a.m.
- Type: Plinian
- Location: North Island, New Zealand; 38°13′30″S 176°30′36″E
- VEI: 5
- Impact: c. 120 killed, Pink and White Terraces destroyed, formation of Waimangu Volcanic Rift Valley, enlargement of Lake Rotomahana

Maps
- {{{map-caption}}}

A violent volcanic eruption occurred in the early hours of 10 June 1886 at Mount Tarawera, near Rotorua on New Zealand's North Island. The eruption reached an estimated volcanic explosivity index (VEI) of 5 and killed an estimated 120 people, making it the largest and deadliest in New Zealand during the past 500 years, a period that includes the entirety of European history in New Zealand.

The eruption began at roughly 2:00 a.m. and lasted for approximately six hours, causing a 10-kilometre-high (6 mi) ash column, earthquakes, lightning, and explosions heard as far away as Blenheim in the South Island – more than 500 kilometres (310 mi) away. A 17-kilometre-long (11 mi) rift formed across the mountain and surrounding area during the eruption, starting from the Wahanga peak at the mountain's northern end and extending in a southwesterly direction, through Lake Rotomahana and forming the Waimangu Volcanic Rift Valley. This rift is where the basaltic dyke that fed the eruption reached the surface.

Damage in the local area was extensive, with ashfall blanketing nearby villages, including Te Wairoa. The eruption is responsible for the presumed destruction of the famed Pink and White Terraces, which prior to the eruption were New Zealand's most famous tourist attraction and brought visitors from across the British Empire. Lake Rotomahana, the former site of the terraces, significantly expanded as a result of the eruption as it filled portions of the newly formed rift valley.

== Geology ==
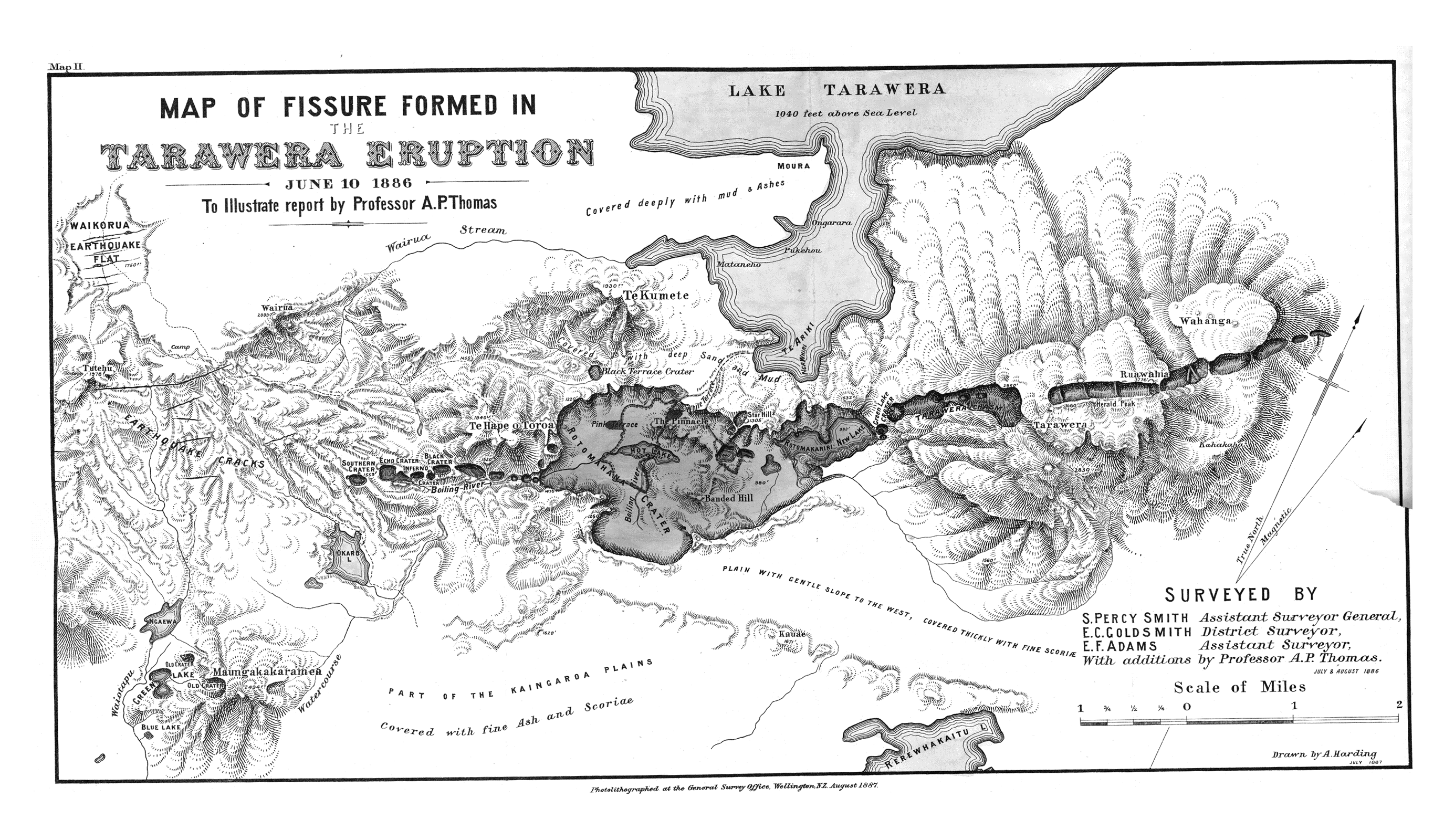
Map of Mount Tarawera in 1887/1888 with approximate pre-1886 eruption features

Mount Tarawera is one of several volcanoes in the central North Island of New Zealand, sitting within the Ōkataina Volcanic Centre along with other volcanic features including Putauaki and the Haroharo vents, as well as Lakes Rotomā and Ōkareka. The Ōkataina Volcanic Centre, one of eight caldera systems in the Taupō Volcanic Zone, is believed to have begun forming around 400,000 years ago, with five of six major eruptions contributing to the formation of the caldera over a period of ~350,000 years. Eruptions from the caldera have typically been rhyolitic, although evidence of basaltic and basaltic-andesite eruptions, as well as pyroclastics, have also been found. Over the past 21,000 years, an estimated 80 cubic kilometres (19 cu mi) of magma and volcanic material has collectively been ejected from 40 vents in the caldera in 11 distinct episodes of activity.

Mount Tarawera itself is a rhyolitic dome volcano that began forming roughly 23,500 years ago in the southeast of Ōkataina Caldera. The mountain was built up over a series of four major volcanic eruptions prior to 1886, each generating significant rhyolitic lava and pyroclastic material. The most recent of these, known as the Kaharoa eruption, occurred in the early 1300s and was responsible for the formation of the three main peaks of the volcano: Wahanga at the north, followed by the highest peak of Ruawahia in the centre, and Tarawera as the southernmost peak. These peaks were carved from an otherwise uneven tableland, itself roughly 4 km (2.5 mi) in length by 1.6 km (1.0 mi) in width, by a series of deep ravines or gullies carved into the landscape. Estimates of the pre-eruption height of Ruawahia vary between 1,080 and 1,100 metres (3,540 and 3,610 ft), with the summit itself showing no evidence of a crater.

Several lakes sat in the area around Mount Tarawera prior to the eruption. The largest of these, Lake Tarawera, is northwest of the mountain and had an estimated height at the time of 317 m (1,040 ft) above sea level, which has since been revised to 298 m (978 ft). To the southwest of the mountain were lakes Rotomahana and Rotomakariri, the names of which translate as warm lake and cold lake respectively and reflect the respective temperatures of the lakes. The warm lake of Rotomahana was 1.6 km (1.0 mi) in length from north to south and 480 m (1,570 ft) across, with three small streams providing the primary inflow to the lake. The cooler and smaller Lake Rotomakariri sat to the east of Rotomahana, with both lakes draining into Lake Tarawera via the Kaiwaka Stream. Much of the ground around Lake Rotomahana was warm to a few centimetres below the surface, with hot springs and steam fumaroles surrounding the lake.

The largest and most famous of these springs were those on the top of the Pink and White Terraces, two distinct sinter terrace formations on the western and northeastern shores of the lake respectively. The White Terraces are believed to have been the largest silica-based terraces in the world, descending from a geyser-fed spring over a height of roughly 30 metres (100 ft) and a distance of 244 metres (800 ft) to cover an area of 2.8 hectares (6.9 acres). The Pink Terraces were the smaller of the two, reaching a height of 26 metres (85 ft) and an area of 2 hectares (4.9 acres), but were known for a distinctive pink hue of the silica.

== Background ==
In the years before the eruption, the area around Mount Tarawera was home to several settlements of Māori belonging to Tūhourangi and Ngāti Rangitihi, two iwi (tribes) which formed part of Te Arawa, a confederation of various tribes who trace their whakapapa (genealogy) to the migratory waka (canoe) of the same name. Settlement did not extend to the mountain, which was deemed tapu (sacred) as it had been used as a chiefly burial ground for generations. As the Pink and White Terraces grew in fame, several of the villages in the area – particularly Te Wairoa – began to develop into tourist towns catering to the growing number of international tourists visiting the area.

To reach the area, visitors typically came from Auckland to Tauranga via train or coastal steamer, transferring to horse-drawn coaches for the journey to Ōhinemutu (now part of Rotorua) and on to Te Wairoa. From Te Wairoa, visitors to the Terraces were rowed across Lake Tarawera to the settlements of Te Ariki and Mouri, before walking across a narrow isthmus to Lake Rotomahana and the site of the terraces. Several Pākehā-run hotels were established in Te Wairoa, with local Māori acting as guides or selling local produce to visitors. This trade brought an estimated £1800 per year to the economy of Te Wairoa (equivalent to roughly NZ $425,000 in 2023), primarily from boat trips, entertainment, and souvenir photography or sketches.

== Prelude ==
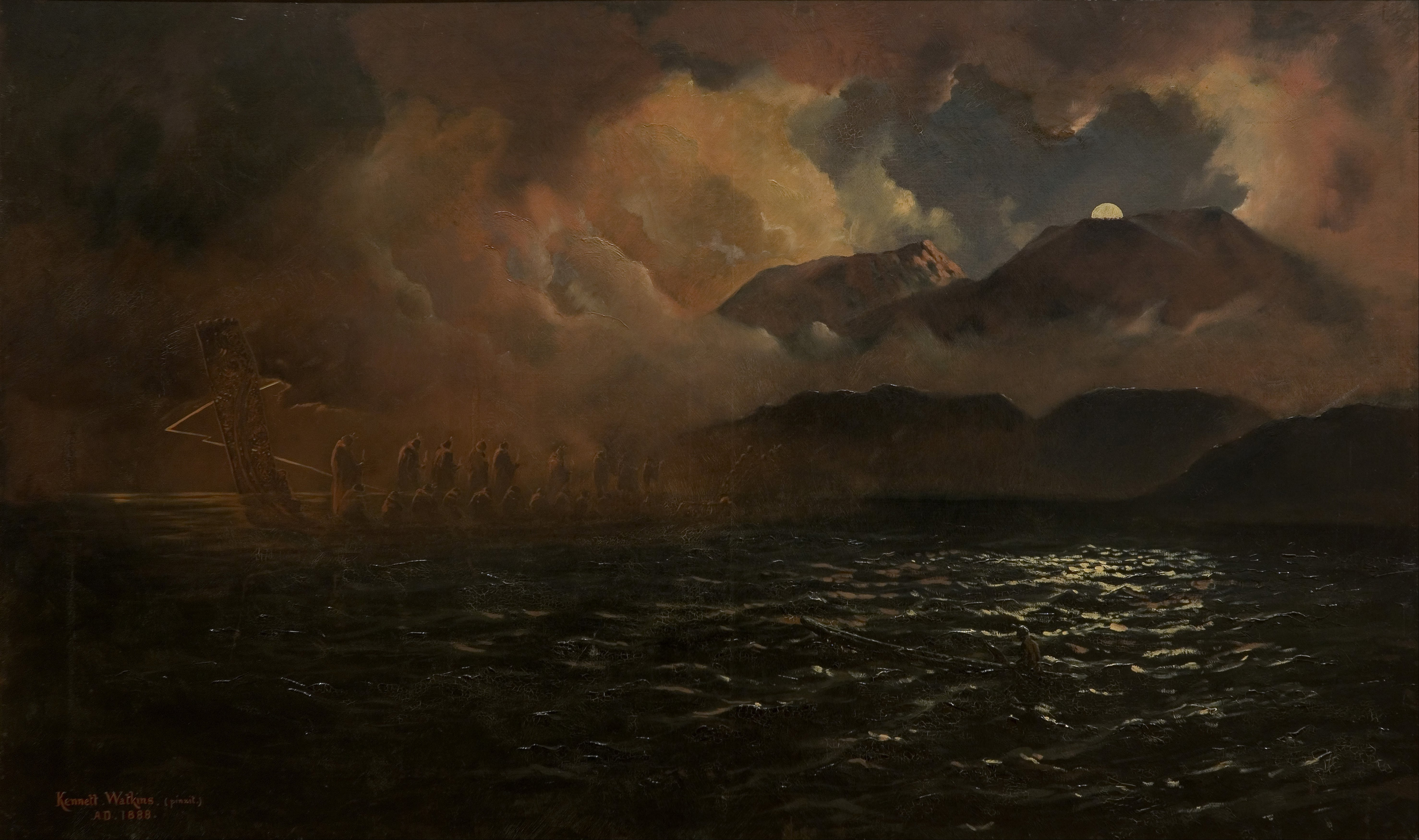
The Phantom Canoe: A Legend of Lake Tarawera, oil on canvas by Kennett Watkins

The months prior to the eruption saw an increase in geothermal activity in the region, particularly through increased discharge at nearby hot springs and geysers. On 22 and 24 November 1885, unusually large eruptions occurred of the geyser at the top of the White Terrace. The second of these was to a height of more than 46 m (150 ft), higher than in the memories of local Māori.

In the days leading up to the eruption, a series of unusual events were documented by those living in or visiting the area. On 31 May 1886, eleven days prior to the eruption, a group of tourists returning from the Terraces claimed to have seen a waka approaching their boat before disappearing into the mist. Witnesses described two rows of occupants, one of which was "standing wrapped in flax robes, their heads bowed and, according to Māori eyewitnesses, their hair plumed as for death" using huia and kōtuku feathers. Tūhoto Ariki, a tohunga at Te Wairoa, declared the tourists had sighted a waka wairua (spirit canoe) which was to herald the destruction of the region.

Further physical signs of unrest in the area were also noted. In one account from 24 May 1886 by Sophia Hinerangi, a renowned Māori guide in the area, her tour party arrived to their boats only to find the creek they were moored in completely dry, with the boats beached in the mud. A series of seiches then occurred, flooding the creek with water from Lake Tarawera before receding again. Local guides refused to go on the lake following this without persuasion, with one reportedly remarking once they had agreed that "we can die but once, so we will all go down together". Two days before the eruption there was more steam activity locally from some steam holes that had been quiet for years. These phenomena were collectively interpreted by a local Māori chief as heralding an impending war, while Tūhoto saw them as consistent with his interpretation of the waka wairua.

== Eruption ==
Deposits of the 1886 eruption. Also shown are Ōkataina surface volcanic deposits in the years after the Rotoiti eruption with darker shading for more recent. Legend: Key for the volcanics that are shown with panning is: basalt; dacite; rhyolite / ignimbrite; █ Definite vents; Ōkataina Volcanic Centre with its embayments; postulated sub calderas of Cole et al. 2009 onwards

The evening before the eruption was a clear night, with nothing unusual until shortly after midnight on the morning of 10 June 1886, when a series of more than 30 increasingly strong earthquakes were felt in the Rotorua area. About 1:20 a.m. there was a flash of light. Explosions began at around 1:30 a.m., with a larger earthquake at around 2:10 a.m. being followed by the formation of an eruption cloud 9.5–10 kilometres (5.9–6.2 mi) high. During this initial phase, an 8-kilometre-long (5.0 mi) fissure vent opened from the Wahanga dome at about 1:30 a.m., based on reports of the location of the initial column. This then extended across Mount Tarawera, with fountains appearing in multiple locations. By 2:30 a.m., all three of Mount Tarawera's peaks had erupted, blasting three distinct columns of smoke and ash thousands of metres into the sky and causing a large amount of volcanic lightning. The fissure continued to expand to the southwest as the eruption progressed, at the same time as eruptive activity was increasing around the present location of Waimangu. One observer at Gisborne estimated the height of the eruption column at about 2:20 a.m. as 10 km (6 mi) high.

At around 3:30 a.m., the largest phase of the eruption commenced when the expanding rift reached Lake Rotomahana, causing the lake water to come into contact with magma and resulting in a large explosion and a volcanic crater two kilometres wide at the site of the lake. This explosion distributed a mix of wet ash and lapilli over an area of 10,000 square kilometres (3,900 sq mi), with heavy accumulations of this mud destroying several villages near to the mountain, causing the majority of deaths associated with the eruption. Ashfall of up to 15 metres (50 ft) was reported in the immediate vicinity of the rift, while a layer of ash 8 to 10 centimetres (3 to 4 in) deep fell on Te Puke and lighter amounts were reported on boats nearly 1,000 kilometres (620 mi) offshore from the Bay of Plenty coast. The ashfall at the top of Putauaki 24 km (15 mi) away was recorded soon after the eruption to be 36 cm (14 in) thick. This stage of the eruption saw a dramatic increase in the height of the eruption column, with estimates placing the height at between 27.8 and 34 kilometres (17.3 and 21.1 mi) in order to produce the pattern of ash observed given weather conditions. Approximately 2 cubic kilometres (0.5 cubic miles) of tephra was erupted during the course of the eruption.

This phase of the eruption continued for less than three hours, with the majority of the eruption having stopped by 6:00 a.m. Ash continued to fall in surrounding areas and as far away as Tauranga, prompting city officials to consider evacuating the city. Material continued to be ejected from craters at Rotomahana and Okaro for up to ten days after the initial eruption, although these declined in frequency and intensity. Occasional phreatic eruptions continued to occur at Rotomahana for months after the initial eruption, before declining volcanic activity allowed the former lake to begin refilling.

The noise from the eruption was reported across the country, including South Island towns such as Kaikōura, where it was thought to be a ship in distress, Blenheim, where the shock-wave rattled windows, and Christchurch, over 800 kilometres (500 mi) away. Māori on the Whanganui River believed the noise to be from an approaching war party, while in Auckland the noise and sight of the eruption was thought by some to be an attack by Russian warships.

=== Later geological knowledge ===
Immediate studies prompted by the eruption led to the first suggestion by a geologist that Lake Taupō hid a volcano, rather than the more obvious volcanoes near Mount Tongariro, that was the likely origin of the extensive pumice deposits of the central North Island. Other deeper local ash (tephra) deposits were believed to have been related to previous local eruptions. The eruption was caused by a basaltic dyke reaching the surface rather than a rhyolytic eruption more typical of the Ōkataina Caldera. The dyke trended at 57° and when it reached the surface it formed the new craters that extended to Waimangu in a rift about 17 km (11 mi) long. The whole eruption has been assigned a VEI of 5. The basalt melt was not mantle-derived, as it had already undergone prior crystallisation. At Waimangu only phreatomagmatic and hydrothermal eruptions occurred, while across the whole area there is no evidence that significant amounts of faulting took place during the eruption.

== Casualties ==
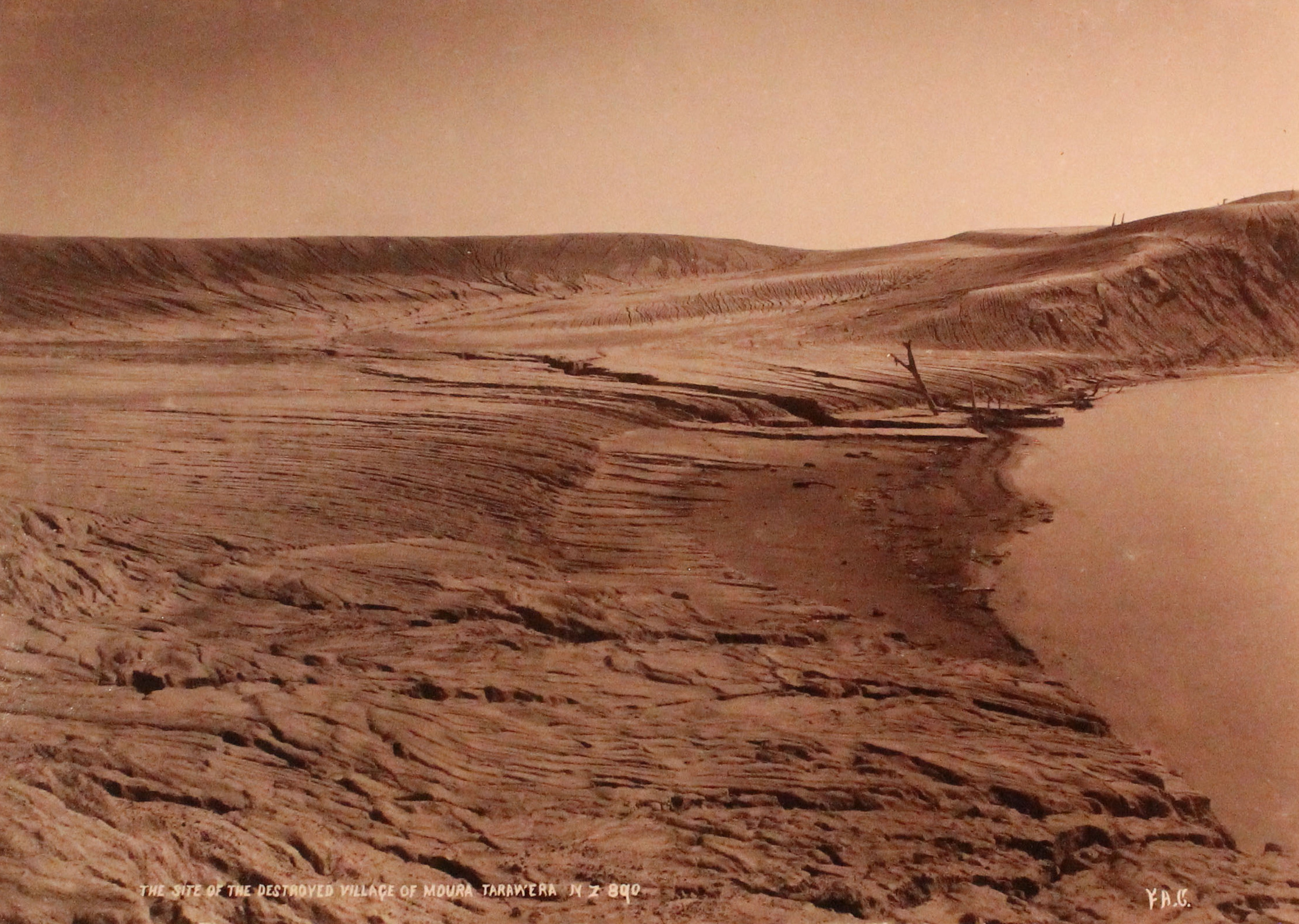
Former location of the village of Moura in 1891

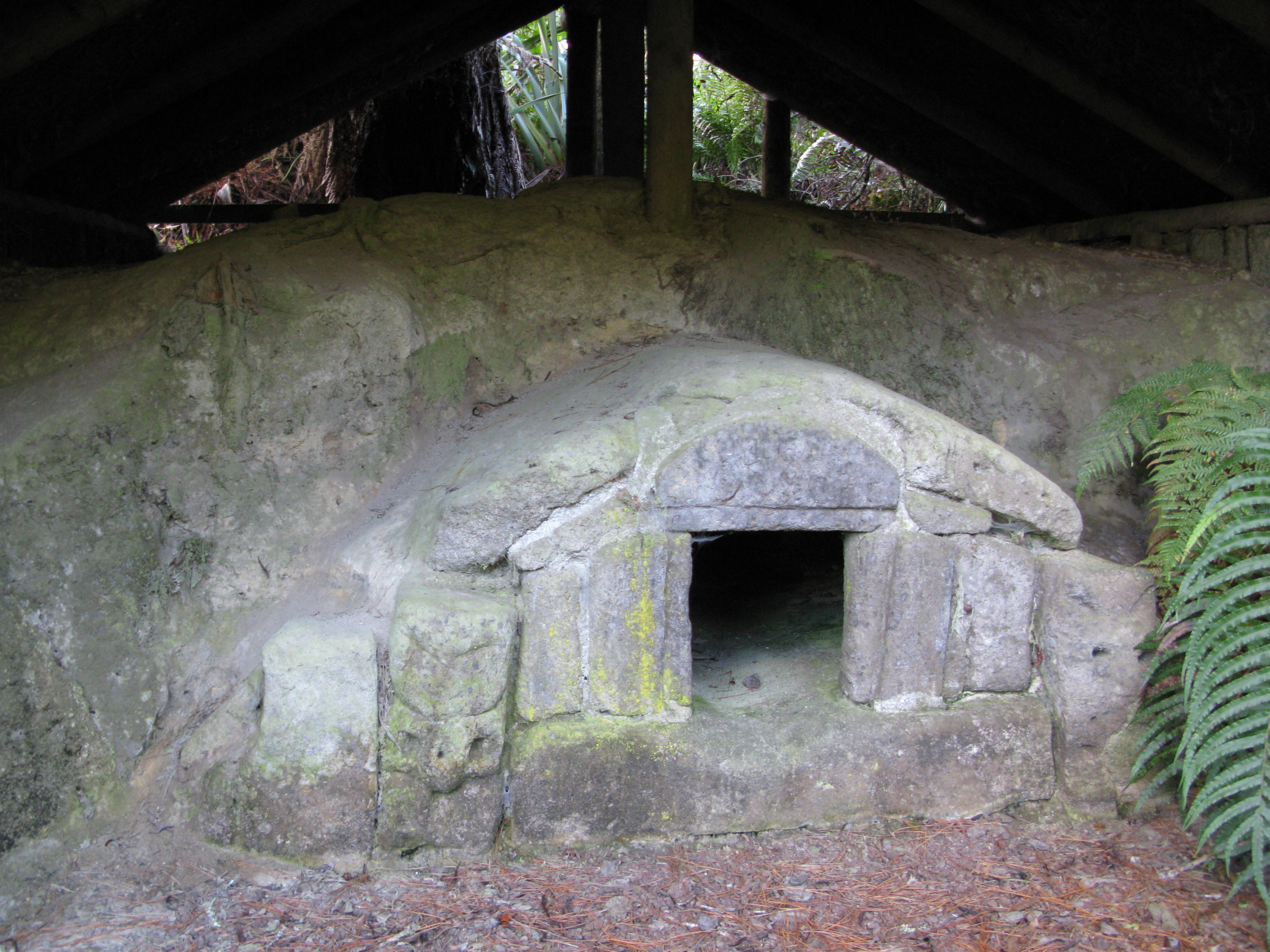
Te Wairoa, "The Buried Village"

The eruption of Mount Tarawera is the deadliest volcanic eruption in recorded New Zealand history. While the actual number of deaths is unknown, estimates at the time placed the death toll at 153, the majority of which were Māori living in villages within 10 km (6 mi) of the rift. Search parties were soon dispatched from Rotorua and Ōhinemutu, which found the settlements of Te Wairoa, Moura, Te Ariki, Te Tapahoro, Totaraiki, and Waingōngongo all to be destroyed or buried. One of these search parties, upon reaching the former sites of Moura and Te Ariki on the southeastern shore of Lake Tarawera, found no survivors at either village or at Waingōngongo. No survivors were reported either from a group of around 12 Māori from Te Ariki, who on the night of the eruption were camping at the Pink Terraces. A further 11 deaths are estimated to have occurred at Tokiniho and 17 at Te Wairoa, however the latter of these reported a number of survivors due to being further from the eruption. As the eruption progressed, several people survived by sheltering in the stronger of Te Wairoa's buildings, such as the wharenui (known as Hinemihi) and Hinerangi's house – in which 62 people took shelter – or a nearby hen house.

Owing to the devastation, many of the survivors from Te Wairoa moved or were relocated to nearby towns following the eruption, such as Whakarewarewa or Rotorua, rather than rebuilding Te Wairoa. This included Hinerangi, who became a tour guide at Whakarewarewa, and Tūhoto, the tohunga who had warned of imminent destruction prior to the eruption. Tūhoto was found alive and uninjured in his buried hut after four days, with rescuers pulling him from the ash despite him demanding that they leave him to die. The tohunga was taken to a Rotorua sanitorium for treatment where he died after two weeks, having reputedly decided to stop living.

Te Wairoa was never rebuilt, and is now a tourist attraction called "The Buried Village", with many of the buildings still covered in ash from the eruption. The village's wharenui, Hinemihi, was later taken to England and erected in the grounds of Clandon Park, the seat of the 4th Earl of Onslow, who had been Governor of New Zealand soon after the eruption.

Estimates on the exact number of casualties vary from around 100 through to several thousand. The latter estimate comes from oral accounts from Ngāti Hinemihi, but is inconsistent with censuses undertaken of the Māori population in the area and pre-eruption understandings of the number of people residing there. After accounting for duplicates in records and potential unknown casualties, recent estimates place the overall death toll at around 120 people, of whom all but 7 were Māori.

== Effects ==
The eruption left the area immediately around the volcano covered by a thick layer of volcanic ash, mud and debris – in some places up to 15 metres (50 ft) thick, which increased to 47 metres (154 ft) on the volcano itself. Forests in the area, which had featured a wide variety of native trees, including rimu, rātā, tōtara and pōhutukawa, were devastated, with rimu and rātā disappearing completely from Tikitapu forest, to Tarawera's west. In contrast to the devastation in Tikitapu forest, many of the larger trees survived in forests on Putauaki, despite 36 centimetres (14 in) of ash falling at that mountain. This difference appears to be due to slight differences in the type of ash that fell in each place: at Tikitapu, the ash was moist and mud-like, while that which fell at Putauaki was dryer and primarily scoria. Other vegetation in the same direction as Putauaki also emerged largely unscathed, despite 60 centimetres (24 in) of ash falling in many places. Forests on Tarawera itself, which were extensive prior to the eruption, were completely destroyed. Accounts from the aftermath describe the forest as "a mass of broken limbs and riven stumps, wrenched and torn to an extent that renders the wood utterly useless."

Ash continued to dominate the landscape for years following the eruption. Rapid erosion caused the formation of steep v-shaped ridges and valleys in the deepest areas of ashfall, providing scientists with a cross-section of the eruption phases. While forest regeneration did occur, this happened at different paces in different locations. This initially included plants such as bracken, tutu, and tree ferns, as well as introduced species such as the blue gum and prickly acacia, but later began to include traditional species such as pōhutukawa, kāmahi and rewarewa. Today, the mountain is covered by regenerating bush and shrubland, with species including mānuka, monoao, mingimingi, and kānuka – although these are coming under increasing threat from introduced wilding pines. Wildlife has also returned to the mountain, with banded dotterel nesting sites and forest gecko found on the slopes.

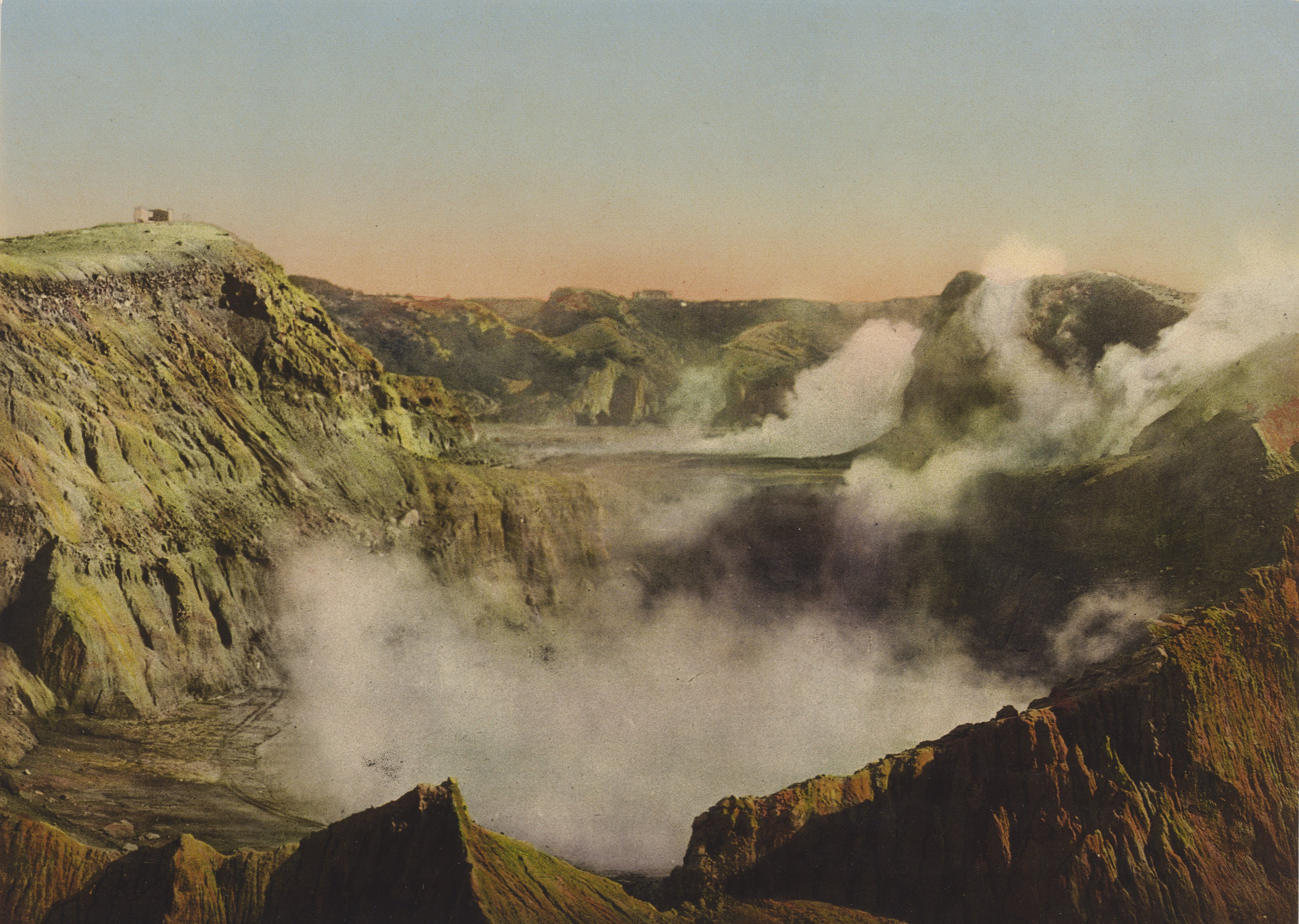
Site of Waimangu Geyser in the newly-formed rift valley, around 1910

The large ash deposits and other volcanic material also blocked the route of Kaiwaka Stream, which had previously drained Lake Rotomahana into nearby Lake Tarawera. As the site of the lake and the craters formed by the eruption gradually refilled with water, the blockage caused the lake to significantly expand, raising its level to its present-day height of 35–48 metres (115–157 ft) above its pre-eruption level and extending its depth up to 75 metres (246 ft) below the old lake floor. The larger Lake Rotomahana includes the former site of Lake Rotomakariri and the surrounding areas, and is both three times wider and longer than the lake was pre-eruption.

The 17-kilometre-long (11 mi) rift which opened during the eruption also significantly changed the landscape. The south-western end of this rift became known as the Waimangu Volcanic Rift Valley, and included a range of new geothermal systems formed in the aftermath of the eruption. The area takes its name from the Waimangu Geyser, which erupted between 1900 and 1904 at heights of up to 460 metres (1,510 ft), making it the most powerful geyser in the world. The rift valley at Waimangu demonstrated signs of instability as a hydrothermal system for decades following its formation, with small hydrothermal eruptions common in the various craters along its length.

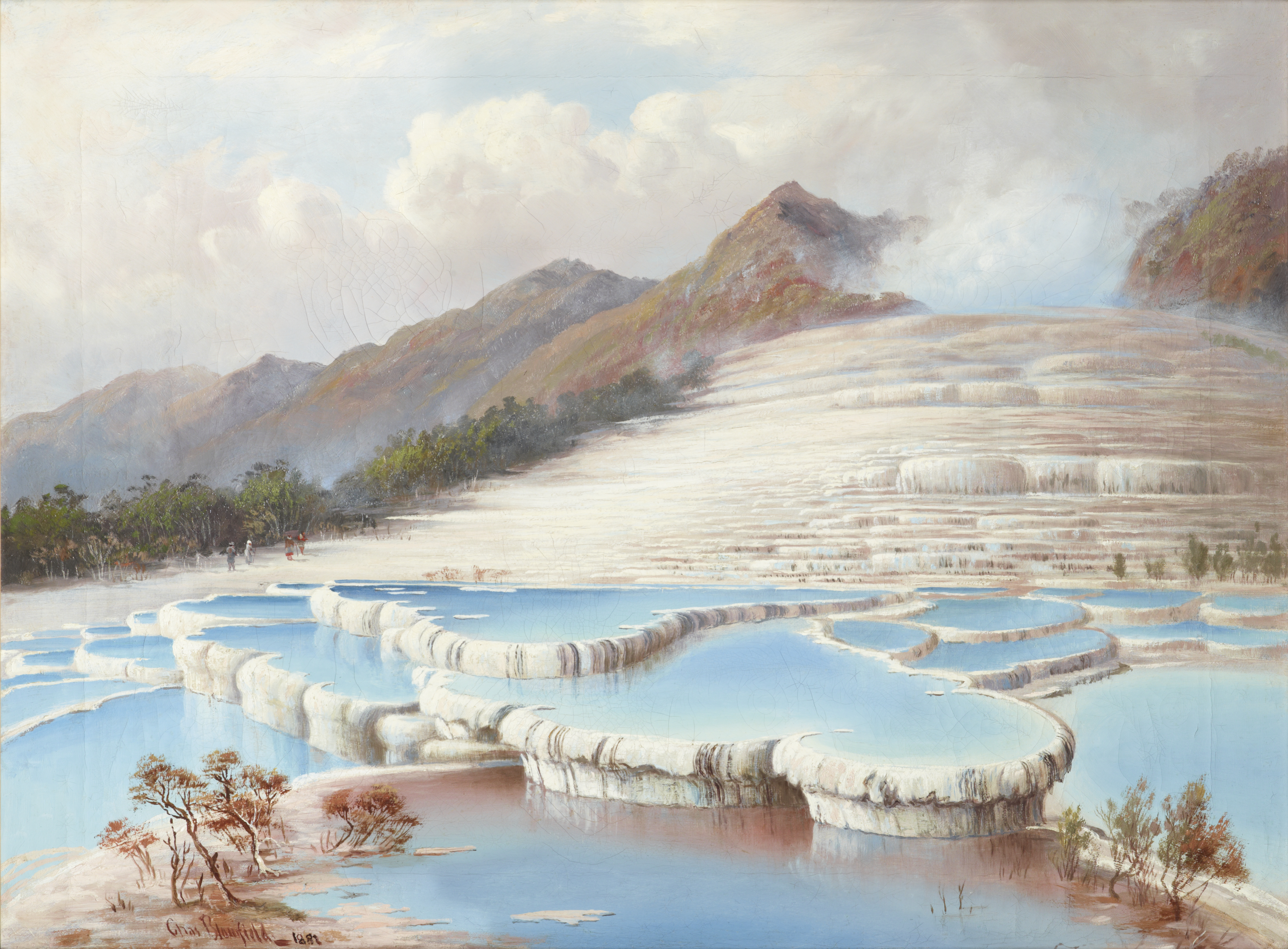
The White Terraces in a painting by Charles Blomfield

=== Pink and White Terraces ===
Most famously, the eruption was long believed to have caused the destruction of the Pink and White Terraces, New Zealand's greatest tourist attraction at the time. The terraces could not be found in the new landscape and were presumed lost due to the devastation across the rest of the area and the proximity of the terraces to the eruption crater. Accounts from the time describe the devastation around where Rotomahana had erupted, with a large crater on the site of the White Terraces which was deemed to confirm "the total destruction of the White Terraces", and the Pink Terraces "having been blown away". The painter Charles Blomfield, who had previously painted the Terraces and wider area prior to the eruption, was equally of the belief that the Terraces had been destroyed. Blomfield returned to the crater for three weeks after the eruption to sketch the new landscape, and upon comparing these sketches to those he had done prior to the eruption determined that there was an "impossibility of the least fragment of the terraces ever being seen again".

Despite this, questions as to the exact fate of the Terraces have persisted since the eruption. In the immediate wake of the eruption, guides in the area explored the new landscape for any sign of the terraces, refusing to believe that they had been destroyed, despite a lack of evidence at the time which would suggest their survival. The drastically changed landscape and the apparent lack of a pre-eruption survey map prevented any conclusive fate to be determined, allowing a range of opposing viewpoints to persist. In 2011 and to coincide with the 125th anniversary of the eruption, scientists from GNS Science announced that they had rediscovered parts of both the Pink and White Terraces 60 metres (200 ft) under the surface of Lake Rotomahana using autonomous underwater vehicles. These findings were later revised in 2014 after further field work to conclude that, while remnants of the Terraces may have survived, they believed that the majority of both Terraces were destroyed in the eruption.

These findings have not settled the debate on the fate of the Terraces, with other studies continuing to propose alternative outcomes. In 2017, a study used a forgotten 1859 survey by Ferdinand von Hochstetter to suggest possible locations of the Pink and White Terraces and map the extent of the original Lake Rotomahana, suggesting instead that the Terraces may be 10 to 15 metres (30 to 50 ft) underground on the northwestern shore of the lake. The location of the Terraces and the extent to which they survive, if at all, continues to be controversial. Studies using a range of methods continue to dispute whether the Terraces are on land or submerged. To date, no proven post-eruption siliceous sinter samples from the Terraces have been produced, so it is unclear if the Terraces were buried, or disrupted by eruption.

== Popular culture ==
The 1984 childrens' book A Canoe in the Mist by Elsie Locke tells the story of the last tourists to visit the pink and white terraces and their experience of the eruption and aftermath from the perspective of two children, one living in the village of Te Wairoa and one visiting as a tourist. It is based closely on historic accounts of the real events and characters.

The eruption was the background to the 1959 BBC radio play Night of the Gods by New Zealand author Bruce Stewart.

== See also ==
- List of volcanoes in New Zealand
- Volcanism of New Zealand
