= Ferdinand von Hochstetter =

German-Austrian geologist (1829-1884)

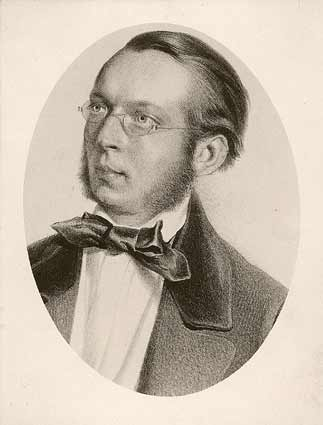
Ferdinand von Hochstetter

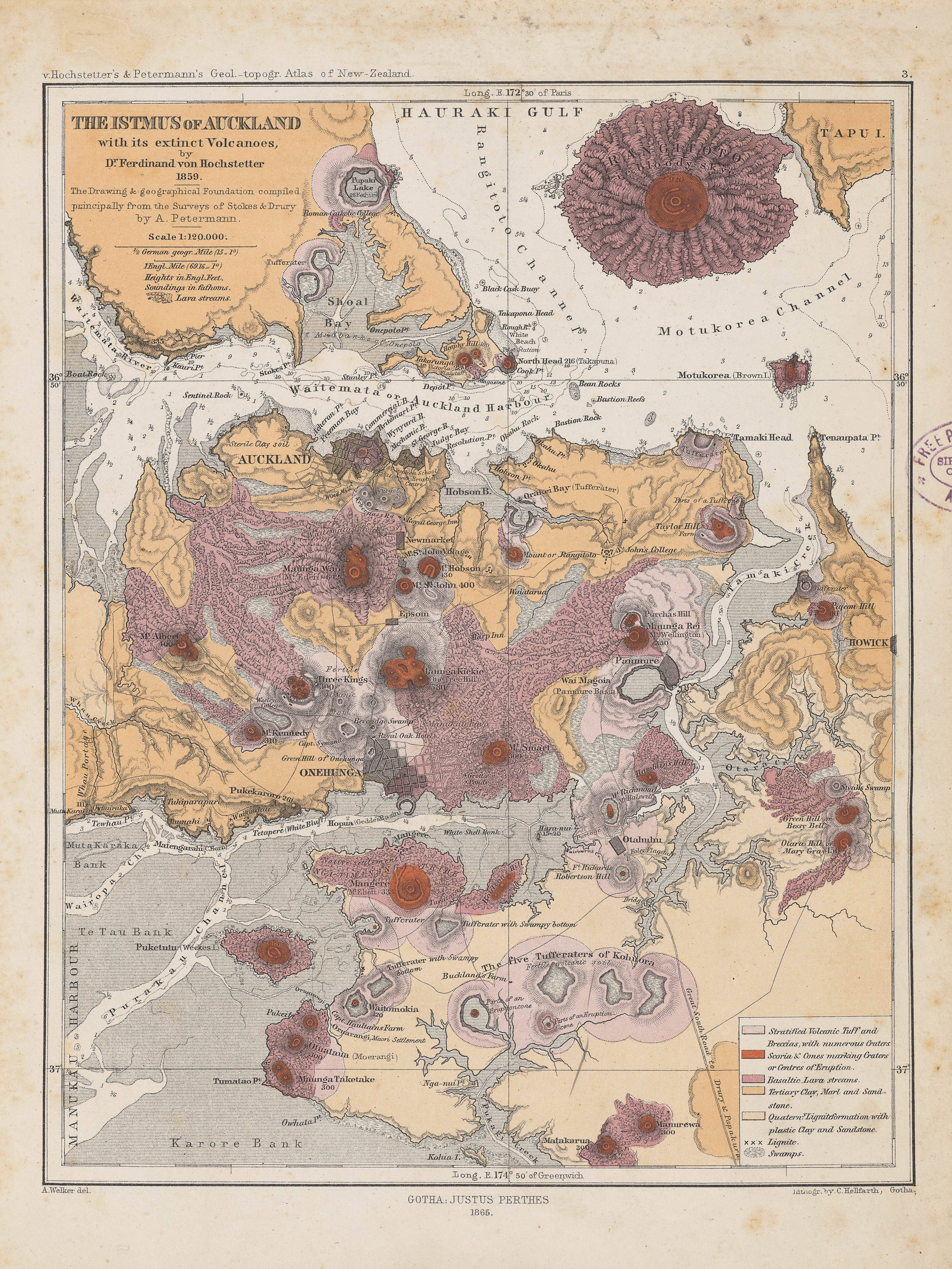
Hochstetter's map of the Auckland volcanic field, originally drawn in 1859 and published in the Geological and Topographical Atlas of New Zealand (1864)

Christian Gottlieb Ferdinand Ritter von Hochstetter (30 April 1829 – 18 July 1884) was a German-Austrian geologist. In 1857 he was appointed geologist on the Austrian Novara expedition to New Zealand, collecting natural history specimens and producing the first geological map of New Zealand.

== Career ==
Von Hochstetter was born in Esslingen, then in the kingdom of Württemberg, to Christian Ferdinand and his second wife, Sophie Orth. His father was a parson who also published on botanical and geological subjects. Having received his early education at the evangelical seminary at Maulbronn, Ferdinand proceeded to the University of Tübingen and the Tübinger Stift. Under Friedrich August von Quenstedt, the interest he already felt in geology became permanently fixed, and he obtained his doctor's degree. Hochstetter was awarded a travelling scholarship.

He then travelled to Vienna where in 1853, he joined the staff of the Imperial Geological Survey of Austria and was engaged until 1856 in parts of Bohemia, especially in the Bohemian Forest, and in the Fichtel Hills and Karlsbad mountains. His excellent reports established his reputation. Thus he came to be chosen as geologist to the Novara expedition (1857-1859), and made numerous valuable observations in the voyage round the world.

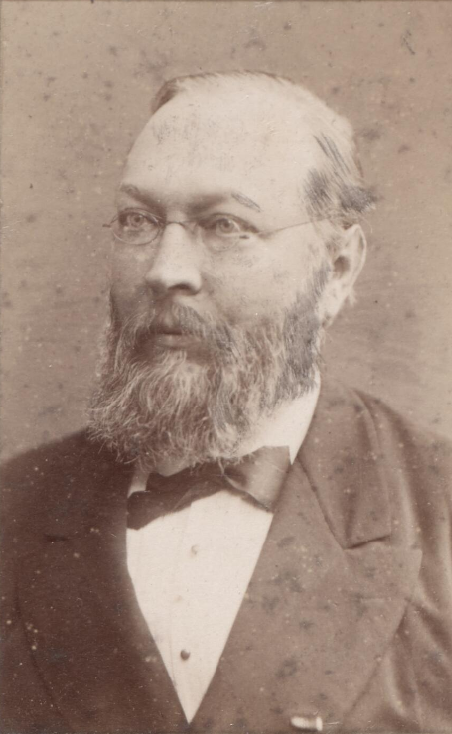
In 1876

The Novara arrived in New Zealand on 22 December 1858. Almost immediately he met the German scientist Julius von Haast who had also recently arrived in New Zealand, with whom he formed a lifelong friendship. Polymath Arthur Purchas convinced von Hochstetter to stay in New Zealand, where he spent the next nine months of his life. In 1859, Ferdinand was employed by the government of New Zealand to make a first geological survey of the islands. His survey of old Lake Rotomahana and the Pink and White Terraces provides the only primary evidence of the Terrace locations today. Between 2016 and 2020, his survey diary was reverse engineered to provide coordinates of the Pink, Black and White Terraces. On his return he was appointed in 1860 professor of mineralogy and geology at the Imperial-Royal Polytechnic Institute in Vienna; from 1874 to 1875, he was the rector there.

His analysis of the tsunami generated by the 1868 Arica (Peru) earthquake is well known for its contribution to understanding of tsunami propagation. The resulting tsunami caused damaging surges in a number of regions in the Pacific region, including fatalities on the Chatham Islands. Von Hochstetter, charted the trajectory of the event throughout the Pacific. This also enabled an estimate of the depth of the Pacific Ocean to be calculated.

In 1872, he became the natural history tutor of Rudolf, Crown Prince of Austria. In 1876, he was made superintendent of the Imperial Natural History Museum. In these later years he explored portions of Turkey and eastern Russia, and he published papers on a variety of geological, palaeontological and mineralogical subjects.

In 1869, he was elected as a member to the American Philosophical Society and in 1884, was granted a hereditary knighthood by the Emperor of Austria.

Detailed descriptions in his diaries were helpful in 2011, when researchers managed to locate the silica terraces on Lake Rotomahana, which was buried in the 1886 eruption of Mount Tarawera.

== Publications and cartographic works ==
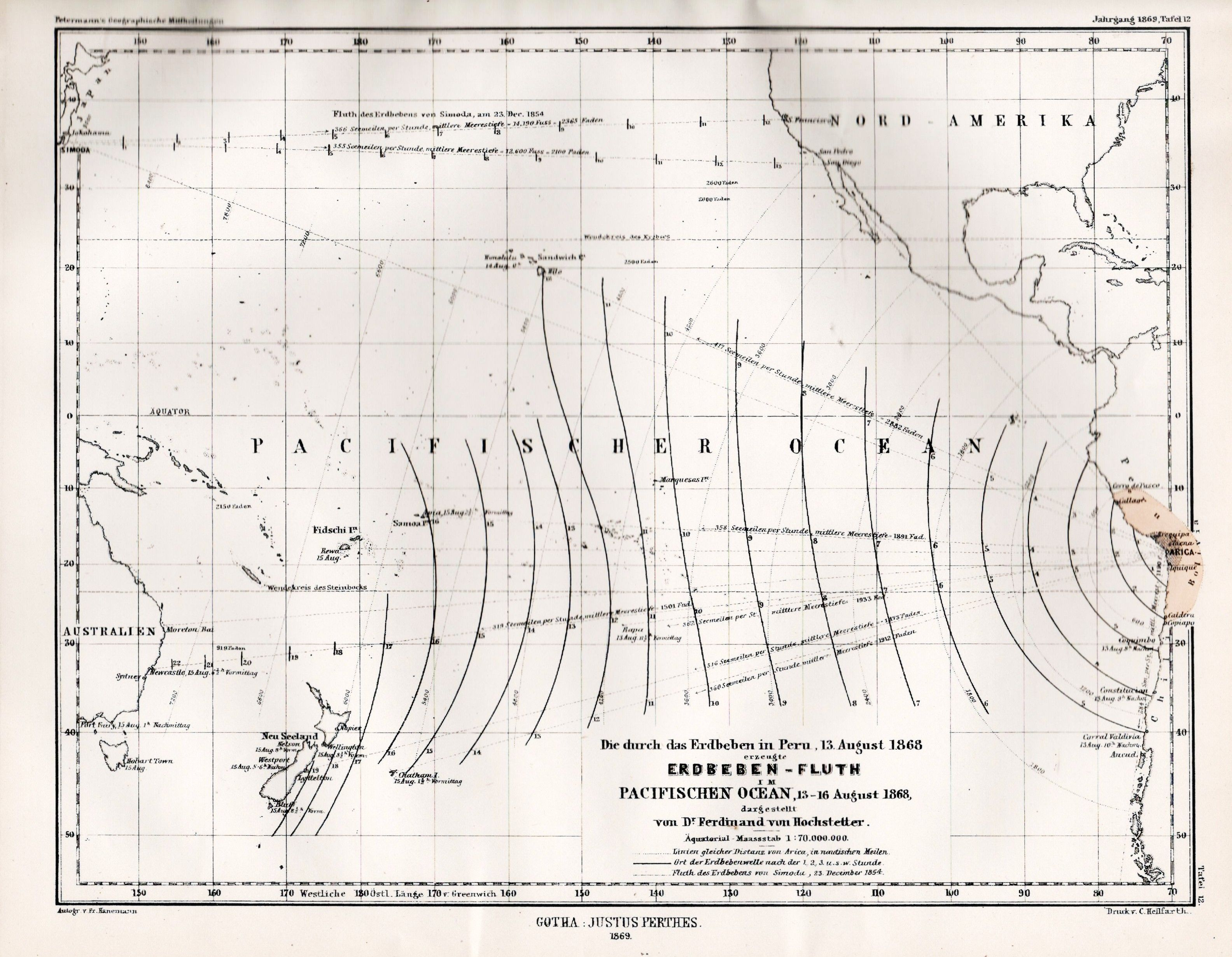
Von Hochstetter's representation of a tsunami propagation after the 1868 Arica earthquake

The results of Hochstetter's research were published in several works. His most well-known publication is the popular travel book New Zealand, which was published in 1863 in German and 1867 in English by Cotta in Stuttgart. The following year, the Imperial Academy of Sciences in Vienna published the volume on the geology of New Zealand as part of the scientific series accompanying the Novara Expedition.

Of particular importance were the geological and topographical maps that Hochstetter produced in collaboration with the cartographer August Petermann and the Justus Perthes Geographical Institute in Gotha. Selected maps were published in Petermanns Geographische Mitteilungen, the leading journal for exploration geography at the time. Additional maps appeared in both Hochstetter’s travel book and in the official publications of the Novara Expedition.

In 1863, all maps were compiled into a geological-topographical atlas, edited jointly with Petermann. This work is regarded as the first atlas of New Zealand. An English edition of the atlas was printed 1864 in Gotha for a publisher in Auckland.

== Personal life ==
He was born at Esslingen, Württemberg, the son of Christian Ferdinand Friedrich Hochstetter (1787–1860) and his second wife, Sophie Orth. Christian Ferdinand was a clergyman and Professor at Bonn, who was also a botanist and mineralogist. In 1861 von Hochstetter married Georgiana Bengough, daughter of John Egbert Bengough, an Englishman who was director of the Vienna city gasworks. They went on to have eight children. A good deal is known of his personal life through his documented correspondence with friend and colleague Julius von Haast He died in Oberdöbling near Vienna, at age 55 from complications of diabetes.

== Legacy ==
The Geoscience Society of New Zealand holds an annual lecture named in von Hochstetter's honour.

=== Taxonomy ===
New Zealand's endemic Hochstetter's frog, Leiopelma hochstetteri, is named after Ferdinand. Several other species bear his name in their scientific names, including the takahē, Porphyrio hochstetteri, and Powelliphanta hochstetteri, a species (with five subspecies) of New Zealand's giant carnivorous land snails.

=== Geography ===
Hochstetter Peak on Trinity Peninsula in Antarctica is named after Hochstetter, as are New Zealand's Mount Hochstetter (West Coast Region), Lake Hochstetter and the Hochstetter Dome and Hochstetter Icefall close to the Tasman Glacier.

=== Geology ===
The rock type dunite was named by Ferdinand von Hochstetter in 1859, after Dun Mountain near Nelson, New Zealand.

== Publications ==
- Karlsbad, seine geognostischen Verhältnisse und seine Quellen (1858)
- Neu-Seeland (1863); published in English as New Zealand: its physical geography, geology, and natural history: with special reference to the results of government expeditions in the provinces of Auckland and Nelson by Dr. Ferdinand von Hochstetter; Translated from the German Original published in 1863 by Edward Sauter... with additions up to 1866 by the author etc. Stuttgart: J.G. Gotta. 1867 – via Internet Archive.
- Geological and Topographical Atlas of New Zealand (1864)
- The geology of New Zealand: in explanation of the geographical and topographical atlas of New Zealand (1864)
- Über das Erdbeben in Peru am 13. August 1868 und die dadurch veranlassten Fluthwellen im Pacifischen Ocean, namentlich an den Küsten von Chili und von Neu-Seeland (1868).
- Leitfaden der Mineralogie and Geologie (with A Bisching) (1876, ed. 8, 1890).

== See also ==
- European and American voyages of scientific exploration
