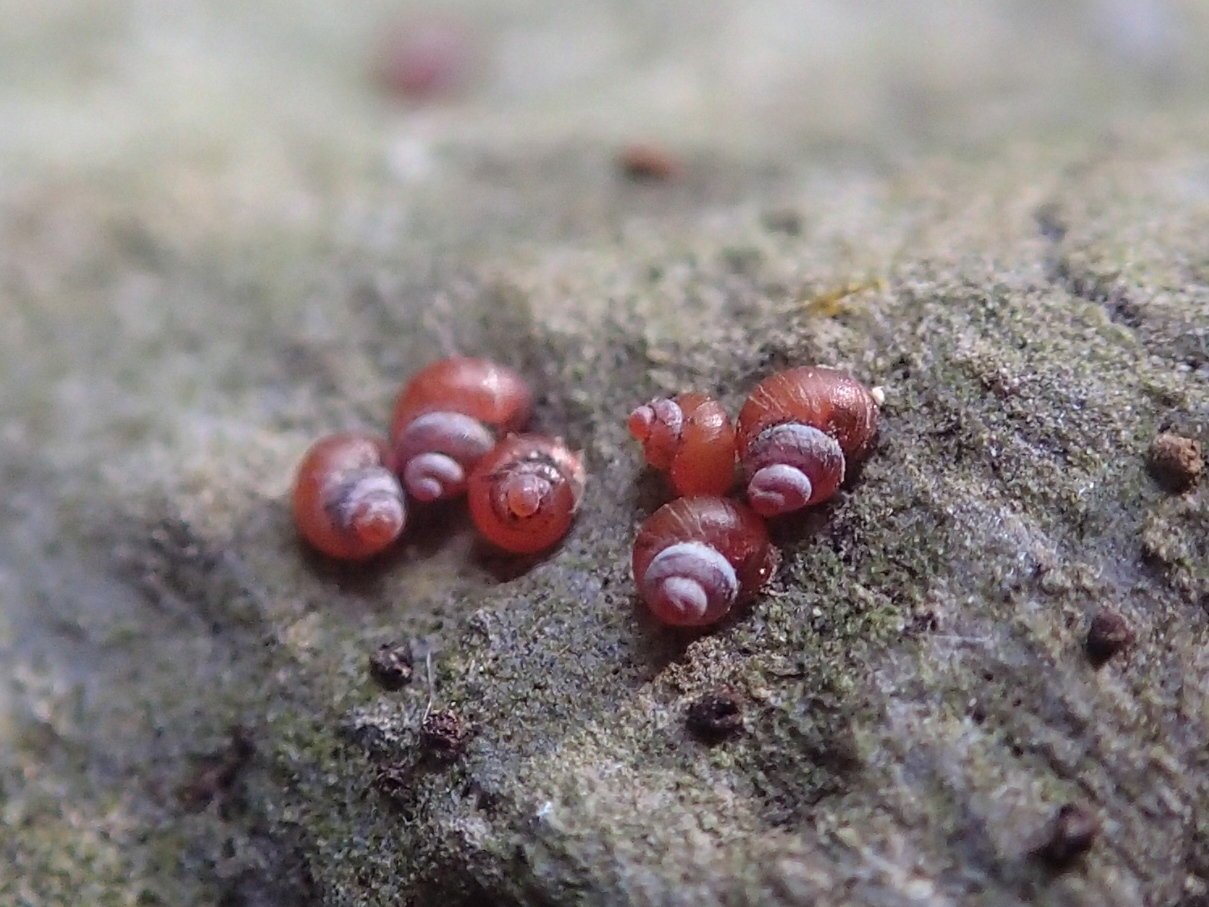
- Georissa shikokuensis

Scientific classification
- Kingdom: Animalia
- Phylum: Mollusca
- Class: Gastropoda
- Order: Cycloneritida
- Superfamily: Hydrocenoidea; Troschel, 1857
- Family: Hydrocenidae; Troschel, 1857

Synonyms
- Georissinae Blanford, 1864

= Hydrocenidae =

Hydrocenidae Temporal range: Cenomanian–Present

Family of gastropods

Hydrocenidae is a taxonomic family of minute land snails or cave snails with an operculum, terrestrial gastropod mollusks or micromollusks in the clade Cycloneritimorpha.

Hydrocenidae are widespread across the Palearctis and Africa, but reach their highest diversity in the Oriental, Australian, and Oceanian regions. The family is poorly known and has not been revised in the past 140 years and as a consequence, the status of the various genus names (including Georissa) is uncertain.

Hydrocenidae is the only family in the superfamily Hydrocenoidea. This family has no subfamilies according to the taxonomy of the Gastropoda by Bouchet & Rocroi, 2005.

== Description ==
The animal have no gill, but a pulmonary cavity. Tentacles are short and large. The eyes are prominent, situated at the upper or outer base of the tentacles. The foot is short, oval and obtuse. The denticle (tiny teeth) of radula have the formula ∞ 1, (1 + 1 + 1), 1 ∞. The central denticles are small and elongated. The lateral tooth is rather large, straight, without a cusp. The numerous lateral teeth are denticulate, and arranged in very oblique series.

The shell is imperforate, conic and globular. Whorls are convex. The spire is short. The peristome is continuous. The columella is callous. The lip is not reflexed. The operculum is calcareous, ornamented with striae which are concentric to the nucleus. The inner side of the operculum is with a prominent apophysis arising from the nucleus.

== Genera ==
Genera and species within the family Hydrocenidae include:

- Genus Georissa Blanford, 1884
- Genus Hydrocena Pfeiffer, 1841
  - Hydrocena cattaroense (Pfeiffer, 1841)
  - ?Hydrocena praecursor Tingting and Neubauer, 2021 Burmese amber, Myanmar, Cenomanian
- Genus Omphalorissa Iredale, 1933
  - Omphalorissa purchasi (Pfeiffer, 1862)
- Monterissa Iredale, 1944
  - Monterissa gowerensis
