= Heteropoma quadrasi =

Conservation status
- Data Deficient (IUCN 2.3)

Scientific classification
- Kingdom: Animalia
- Phylum: Mollusca
- Class: Gastropoda
- Subclass: Caenogastropoda
- Order: Littorinimorpha
- Family: Assimineidae
- Genus: Heteropoma
- Species: H. quadrasi

Binomial name
- Heteropoma quadrasi (Möllendorff, 1894)

Species of gastropod

Heteropoma quadrasi is a species of small, salt marsh snails with an operculum, aquatic gastropod mollusks, or micromollusks, in the family Assimineidae. This species is endemic to Guam.

The species exhibits a distinct variation in shell morphology between juveniles and adults. The juvenile shells have a distinctly broader base compared to the more slender adult shells. The species has a wide range of color variation, from yellowish brown to dark brown, with some individuals having a distinct reddish-brown coloration.

Heteropoma quadrasi is an active predator, feeding primarily on small gastropods and bivalves. The species has a radula, a ribbon-like structure in the mouth that is used for scraping and tearing food items.
