= Cryptassiminea kershawi =

Scientific classification
- Kingdom: Animalia
- Phylum: Mollusca
- Class: Gastropoda
- Subclass: Caenogastropoda
- Order: Littorinimorpha
- Family: Assimineidae
- Genus: Cryptassiminea
- Species: C. kershawi

Binomial name
- Cryptassiminea kershawi Fukuda & Ponder, 2005

Species of gastropod

Cryptassiminea kershawi is a species of small operculate snail, a marine gastropod mollusc or micromollusc in the family Assimineidae.
