= Angustassiminea kyushuensis =

Scientific classification
- Kingdom: Animalia
- Phylum: Mollusca
- Class: Gastropoda
- Subclass: Caenogastropoda
- Order: Littorinimorpha
- Family: Assimineidae
- Genus: Angustassiminea
- Species: A. kyushuensis

Binomial name
- Angustassiminea kyushuensis S. Habe & T. Habe, 1983

Species of gastropod

Angustassiminea kyushuensis is a species of small operculate snail, a terrestrial gastropod mollusk or micromollusk in the family Assimineidae.

== Distribution ==
This species has been found in brackish waters in Northern Kyushu, Japan.
