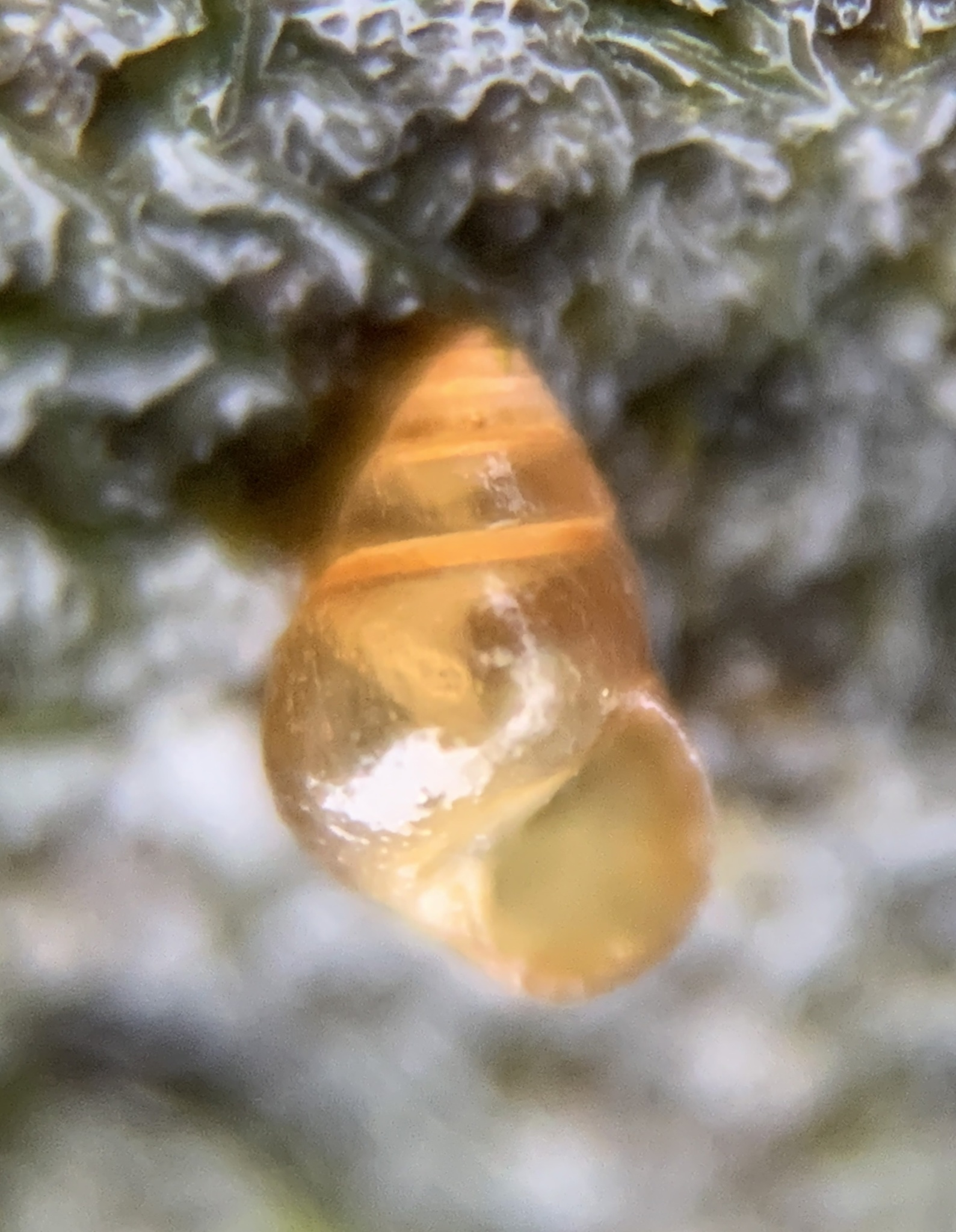

Conservation status
- Secure (NatureServe)

Scientific classification
- Kingdom: Animalia
- Phylum: Mollusca
- Class: Gastropoda
- Subclass: Caenogastropoda
- Order: Littorinimorpha
- Family: Assimineidae
- Genus: Angustassiminea
- Species: A. succinea

Binomial name
- Angustassiminea succinea (L. Pfeiffer, 1840)

Synonyms
- List: Assiminea modesta H. C. Lea, 1845; Assiminea succinea (L. Pfeiffer, 1840); Paludina succinea L. Pfeiffer, 1840

= Angustassiminea succinea =

Species of gastropod

Angustassiminea succinea is a species of small operculate snail, a terrestrial gastropod mollusk or micromollusk in the family Assimineidae.

== Description ==
The maximum recorded shell length is 3 mm.

(Original description in Latin) The shell is conical, smooth translucent and amber-colored. It is imperforate. It has five whorls, with the body whorl being ventricose. The margin of the aperture is slightly thickened and whitish.

== Distribution and habitat ==
Angustassiminea succinea has been found in Mexico, Belize, northern South America, and on the western shores of the Atlantic Ocean and the Caribbean Sea. The maximum recorded depth is 4m.
