= Heteropoma =

Scientific classification
- Domain: Eukaryota
- Kingdom: Animalia
- Phylum: Mollusca
- Class: Gastropoda
- Subclass: Caenogastropoda
- Order: Littorinimorpha
- Family: Assimineidae
- Genus: Heteropoma

species
- See text

Synonyms
- Allepithema Tomlin, 1931 (Invalid: established as an unnecessary nom. nov. pro Heteropoma Möllendorff, 1894, by Tomlin treated as junior homonym of "Heteropoma Benson, 1856")

Genus of molluscs

Heteropoma is a genus of minute, salt marsh snails with an operculum, aquatic gastropod mollusks, or micromollusks, in the family Assimineidae.

== Species ==
Species in the genus Heteropoma include:

- Heteropoma fulvum (Quadras & Möllendorff, 1894)
- Heteropoma glabratum
- Heteropoma pyramis
- Heteropoma quadrasi
- Heteropoma tuberculatum
- Heteropoma turritum
