= Angustassiminea lucida =

Scientific classification
- Kingdom: Animalia
- Phylum: Mollusca
- Class: Gastropoda
- Subclass: Caenogastropoda
- Order: Littorinimorpha
- Family: Assimineidae
- Genus: Angustassiminea
- Species: A. lucida

Binomial name
- Angustassiminea lucida (Pease, 1869)

Synonyms
- List: Assiminea lucida Pease, 1869 (original combination)

Species of gastropod

Angustassiminea lucida is a species of small operculate snail, a terrestrial gastropod mollusk or micromollusk in the family Assimineidae.

== Description ==
The length of the shell attains 3 mm, its diameter 1.5 mm.

(Original description in Latin) The shell is imperforate (lacking an umbilicus), ovate-conical, smooth, shining, translucent and rather thin. It is yellowish and pale reddish near the suture. The spire is conical, with a somewhat acute apex. It has six convex whorls, which are angled near the suture. The aperture is vertical and ovate, and it is angled at the top. The peristome (margin) is simple, with the margins joined by a thin callus.

== Distribution ==
This terrestrial species has been found on the Tuamotu Islands.
