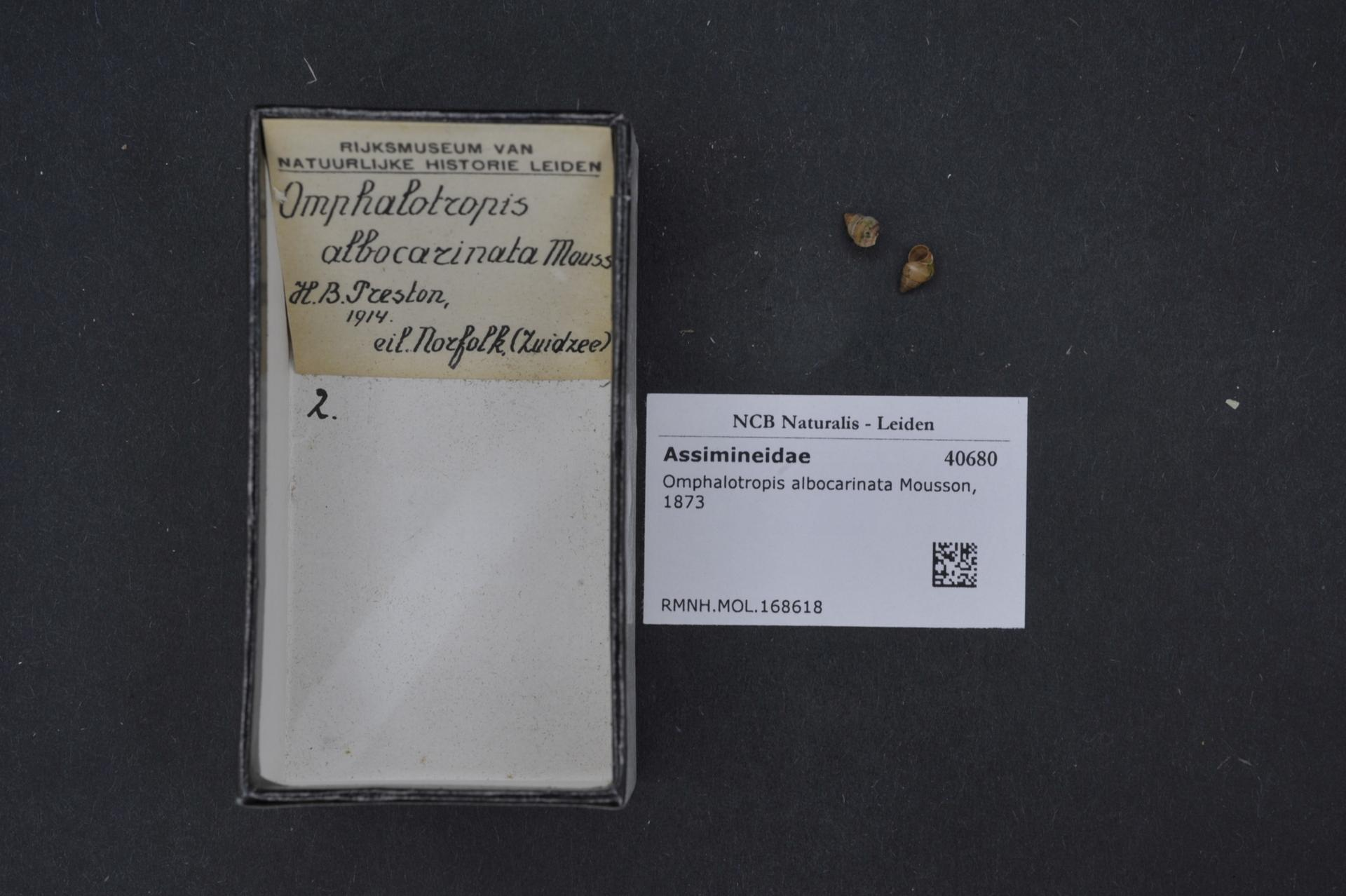
- Shell of Duritropis albocarinata (specimen at Naturalis Biodiversity Center)

Conservation status
- Data Deficient (IUCN 2.3)

Scientific classification
- Kingdom: Animalia
- Phylum: Mollusca
- Class: Gastropoda
- Subclass: Caenogastropoda
- Order: Littorinimorpha
- Family: Assimineidae
- Genus: Duritropis
- Species: D. albocarinata

Binomial name
- Duritropis albocarinata (Mousson, 1873)

Synonyms
- Duritropis brenchleyi (Sykes, 1900) (junior synonym); Duritropis fortilirata Iredale, 1945 (junior synonym); Omphalotropis albocarinata Mousson, 1873 (original combination); Omphalotropis brenchleyi Sykes, 1900 (junior synonym)

= Duritropis albocarinata =

Species of gastropod

Omphalotropis albocarinata is a species of small salt marsh snail with an operculum, a terrestrial gastropod mollusk, or micromollusk, in the family Assimineidae.

This species is endemic to Norfolk Island.
