= Limborelia innesi =

Scientific classification
- Domain: Eukaryota
- Kingdom: Animalia
- Phylum: Mollusca
- Class: Gastropoda
- Subclass: Caenogastropoda
- Order: Littorinimorpha
- Family: Assimineidae
- Genus: Limborelia
- Species: L. innesi

Binomial name
- Limborelia innesi (Iredale, 1944)
- Location of Lord Howe Island

Species of land snail

Limborelia innesi, also known as the compact palmleaf snail, is a species of palmleaf snail that is endemic to Australia's Lord Howe Island in the Tasman Sea.

== Description ==
The turbinate to conical shell of adult snails is 3.6–3.9 mm in height, with a diameter of 2.5–2.8 mm. It is smooth, dark brown to black in colour, with a pointed spire. The animal's body and cephalic tentacles are black.

== Habitat ==
The snail is found on the southern mountains of the island, in rainforest and moist woodland, living on rock faces above an elevation of 400 m.
