= Rugapedia androgyna =

Scientific classification
- Kingdom: Animalia
- Phylum: Mollusca
- Class: Gastropoda
- Subclass: Caenogastropoda
- Order: Littorinimorpha
- Family: Assimineidae
- Genus: Rugapedia
- Species: R. androgyna

Binomial name
- Rugapedia androgyna Fukuda & Ponder, 2004

Species of gastropod

Rugapedia androgyna is a species of small operculate snail, a marine gastropod mollusk or micromollusk in the family Assimineidae.
