= Eussoia leptodonta =

Conservation status
- Data Deficient (IUCN 3.1)

Scientific classification
- Kingdom: Animalia
- Phylum: Mollusca
- Class: Gastropoda
- Subclass: Caenogastropoda
- Order: Littorinimorpha
- Family: Assimineidae
- Genus: Eussoia
- Species: E. leptodonta

Binomial name
- Eussoia leptodonta Nevill, 1881

Species of gastropod

Eussoia leptodonta is a species of small operculate snail, a marine gastropod mollusk or micromollusk in the family Assimineidae.

== Distribution ==
The species has only ever been found in Komati River estuary at Rikatla, Mozambique.
