= Conassiminea zheni =

Scientific classification
- Kingdom: Animalia
- Phylum: Mollusca
- Class: Gastropoda
- Subclass: Caenogastropoda
- Order: Littorinimorpha
- Family: Assimineidae
- Genus: Conassiminea
- Species: C. zheni

Binomial name
- Conassiminea zheni Fukuda & Ponder, 2006

Species of gastropod

Conassiminea zheni is a species of small operculate snail, a marine gastropod mollusk or micromollusk in the family Assimineidae.

== Distribution ==
This marine species is endemic to Australia and occurs among roots in mangroves off Victoria.
