= Paludinella sicana =

Scientific classification
- Kingdom: Animalia
- Phylum: Mollusca
- Class: Gastropoda
- Subclass: Caenogastropoda
- Order: Littorinimorpha
- Family: Assimineidae
- Genus: Paludinella
- Species: P. sicana

Binomial name
- Paludinella sicana (Brugnone, 1876)

Species of gastropod

Paludinella sicana is a species of small operculate snail, a marine gastropod mollusk or micromollusk in the family Assimineidae.
