= Heteropoma glabratum =

Conservation status
- Data Deficient (IUCN 2.3)

Scientific classification
- Kingdom: Animalia
- Phylum: Mollusca
- Class: Gastropoda
- Subclass: Caenogastropoda
- Order: Littorinimorpha
- Family: Assimineidae
- Genus: Heteropoma
- Species: H. glabratum

Binomial name
- Heteropoma glabratum (Quadras & Möllendorff, 1894)

Species of gastropod

Heteropoma glabratum is a species of small, salt marsh snails with an operculum, aquatic gastropod mollusks, or micromollusks, in the family Assimineidae. This species is endemic to Guam.
