= Angustassiminea nitida =

Scientific classification
- Kingdom: Animalia
- Phylum: Mollusca
- Class: Gastropoda
- Subclass: Caenogastropoda
- Order: Littorinimorpha
- Family: Assimineidae
- Genus: Angustassiminea
- Species: A. nitida

Binomial name
- Angustassiminea nitida (Pease, 1865)

Synonyms
- List: Assiminea (Assiminea) nitida (Pease, 1865); Assiminea nitida (Pease, 1865); Hydrocena nitida Pease, 1865 (original combination); Syncera nitida (Pease, 1865) (genus name unavailable)

Species of gastropod

Angustassiminea nitida is a species of small operculate snail, a terrestrial gastropod mollusk or micromollusk in the family Assimineidae.

== Description ==
The length of the shell attains 2.5 mm, its diameter 2 mm.

(Original description in Latin) The ovate shell is pyramidal. It is shining, smooth and rather solid. It has five convex whorls. The body whorl is large and nearly equals half the length of the shell. The umbilical chink is perforate. The sutures are impressed and sometimes thinly margined. The aperture is ovate. The peristome (margin) is simple and non-continuous.

== Distribution ==
This terrestrial species has been found on the Cook Islands and on French Polynesia.
