= Suterilla julieae =

Scientific classification
- Kingdom: Animalia
- Phylum: Mollusca
- Class: Gastropoda
- Subclass: Caenogastropoda
- Order: Littorinimorpha
- Family: Assimineidae
- Genus: Suterilla
- Species: S. julieae

Binomial name
- Suterilla julieae Fukuda, Ponder & Marshall, 2006

Species of gastropod

Suterilla julieae is a species of small operculate snail, a marine gastropod mollusc or micromollusc in the family Assimineidae.
