= Paludinella vitrea =

Conservation status
- Data Deficient (IUCN 2.3)

Scientific classification
- Kingdom: Animalia
- Phylum: Mollusca
- Class: Gastropoda
- Subclass: Caenogastropoda
- Order: Littorinimorpha
- Family: Assimineidae
- Genus: Paludinella
- Species: P. vitrea

Binomial name
- Paludinella vitrea Thiele, 1927

Species of gastropod

Paludinella vitrea is a species of minute salt marsh snail with an operculum, an aquatic gastropod mollusk or micromollusk in the family Assimineidae. This species is endemic to Palau.
