= Heteropoma fulvum =

Conservation status
- Data Deficient (IUCN 2.3)

Scientific classification
- Kingdom: Animalia
- Phylum: Mollusca
- Class: Gastropoda
- Subclass: Caenogastropoda
- Order: Littorinimorpha
- Family: Assimineidae
- Genus: Heteropoma
- Species: H. fuluma

Binomial name
- Heteropoma fuluma (Quadras & Möllendorff, 1894)

Synonyms
- Heteropoma fulva (Quadras & Möllendorff, 1894) (incorrect gender ending)

Species of gastropod

Heteropoma fulvum is a species of minute, salt marsh snails with an operculum, aquatic gastropod mollusks, or micromollusks, in the family Assimineidae.

== Distribution ==
This species is endemic to Guam.
