= Cyclotropis =

Cyclotropis may refer to:

- Cyclotropis (gastropod), a genus of gastropods in the family Assimineidae
- Cyclotropis, a genus of millipedes in the family Aphelidesmidae, synonym of Thrinoxethus
- Cyclotropis, a genus of gastropods in the family Oriostomatidae, synonym of Beraunia
