= Paludinella minima =

Conservation status
- Data Deficient (IUCN 2.3)

Scientific classification
- Kingdom: Animalia
- Phylum: Mollusca
- Class: Gastropoda
- Subclass: Caenogastropoda
- Order: Littorinimorpha
- Family: Assimineidae
- Genus: Paludinella
- Species: P. minima

Binomial name
- Paludinella minima Habe

Species of gastropod

Paludinella minima is a species of small salt marsh snail with an operculum, an aquatic gastropod mollusk or micromollusk in the family Assimineidae. This species is endemic to Japan.
