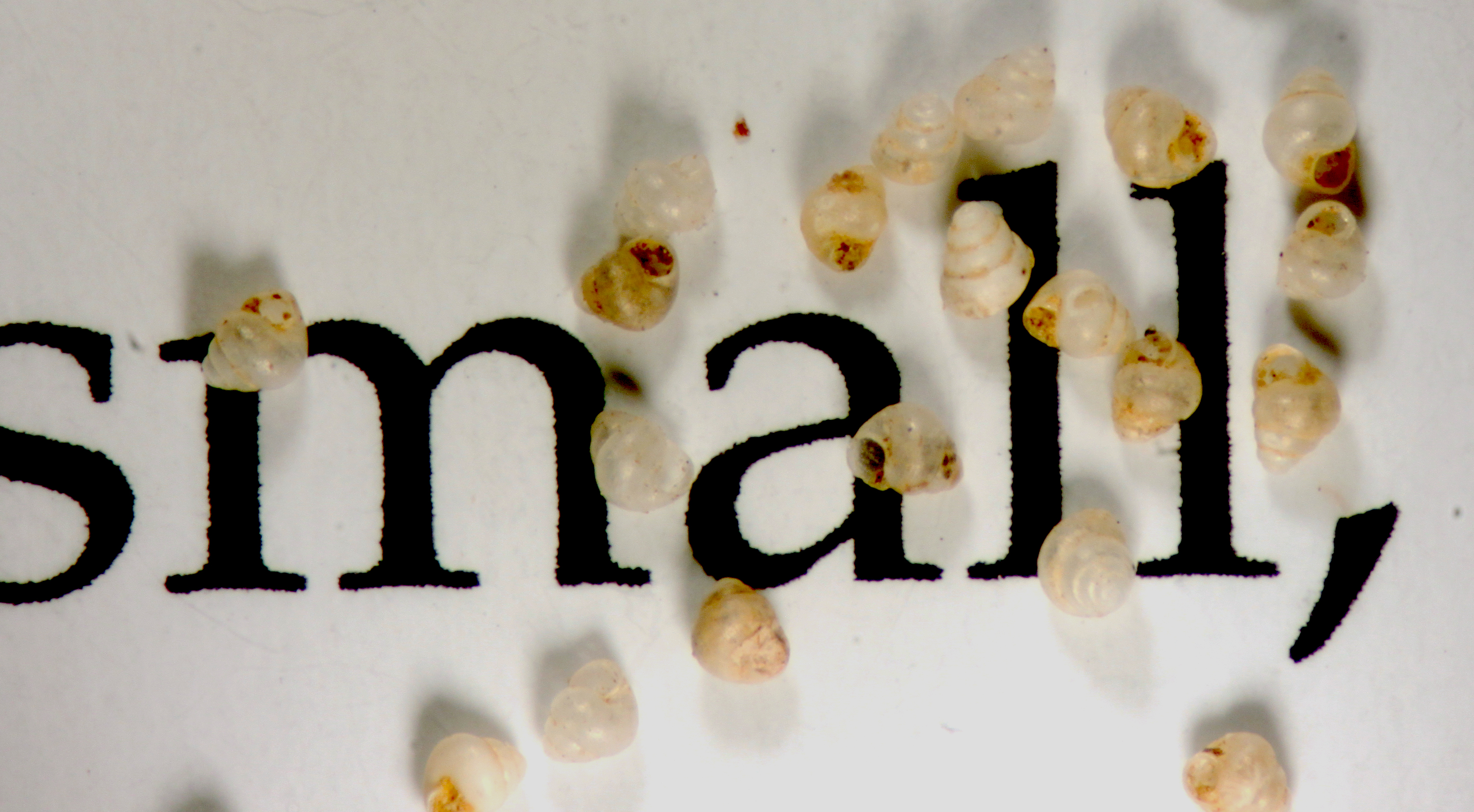
- Shells of Acmella nana on a 12-point-font print.

Scientific classification
- Kingdom: Animalia
- Phylum: Mollusca
- Class: Gastropoda
- Subclass: Caenogastropoda
- Order: Littorinimorpha
- Family: Assimineidae
- Genus: Acmella
- Species: A. nana

Binomial name
- Acmella nana Vermeulen, Liew & Schilthuizen, 2015

= Acmella nana =

Species of gastropod

Acmella nana is a species of land snail discovered from Borneo, Malaysia, in 2015. It was described by Jaap J. Vermeulen of the JK Art and Science in Leiden, Thor-Seng Liew of the Institute for Tropical Biology and Conservation at the Universiti Malaysia Sabah, and Menno Schilthuizen of the Naturalis Biodiversity Center in Leiden. It was named nana (Latin for "dwarf") due to its minute size. Measuring only 0.7 millimeters in size, it is the smallest known land snail as of 2015. It surpasses the earlier record attributed to Angustopila dominikae, which is 0.86 mm in size, described from China in September 2015.

== Etymology ==
The genus name Acmella is derived from a Greek word akme meaning "(the highest) point, edge or peak of anything." The species name nana was derived from a Latin word nanus meaning "dwarf", and was chosen because of its small size.

== Description ==
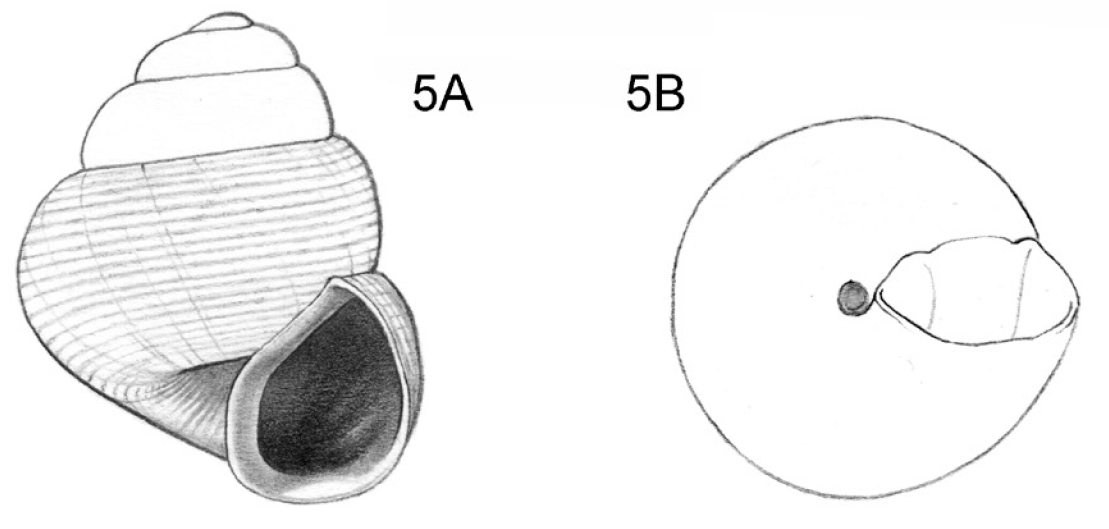
Shell of Acmella nana.

Acmella nana has a shell, which is whitish in colour and has a shiny appearance. The shell is translucent and measures 0.50 to 0.60 mm in width, and 0.60 to 0.79 mm in height. In average the size is 0.7 mm. Due to its size, it cannot be directly noticed by naked eye, and can be seen clearly under microscope. It has 2 to 3 whorls, and the aperture opening is 0.26-0.30 mm wide and 0.30-0.37 mm high.

== Discovery ==
Acmella nana was discovered from limestone hills in Borneo. Knowing that limestone and snail shells are both composed of calcium carbonate, the research team led by two Dutch biologists Jaap J. Vermeulen and Menno Schilthuizen, and a Malaysian biologist Thor-Seng Liew collected soil and litter and dirt from the cliffs. Then they separated the larger particles from the smaller ones using sieves. They put the larger particles in a bucket of water and stirred them. The minerals such as clay and sand settled at the bottom, while the shells, being buoyant, float up on the surface. This is because, although the shells are chemically same as the minerals, their internal cavities contain air pockets. The shells were then examined under microscope. The taxonomic description was published in the 2 November 2015 issue of ZooKeys, and the paper also included a report of other 47 new species of snails. Schilthuizen remarked, saying, "Our paper was in review when that paper on Angustopila dominikae came out and it was only then that we realized that one of 'our' species was actually smaller." The main specimen (holotype) was collected by Vermeulen from the Niah Caves in Sarawak, Malaysia. Other specimens were from Sabah.

== Biology ==
Since the specimens are only the shells, and not living snails, it is not possible to know details of the biology. But a closely related species Acmella polita is known in the same area. This snail eats thin films of bacteria and fungi growing on the limestone walls inside the caves. The researchers speculated that Acmella nana does the same. The presence of an opening called operculum on the shell suggests that it may also possess gills. Gills would be the respiratory organs for their wet environment. Such gills are known in aquatic snails. It is also assumed that the species is distributed in other parts of Borneo, and that their survival is not a serious threat. However, according to Schilthuizen, they can become threatened due to heavy quarrying in these limestone hills.

== See also ==
- Smallest organisms
