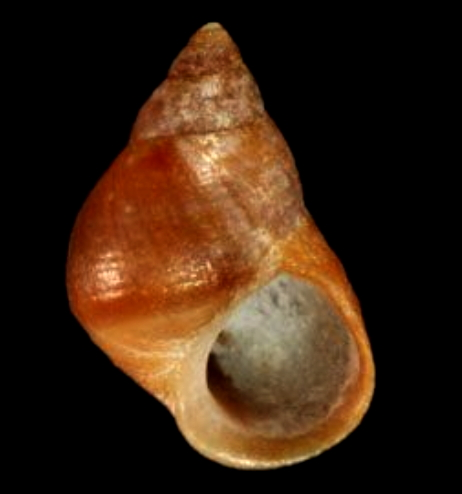
- Shell of Angustassiminea californica (specimen at the Natural History Museum, Rotterdam)

Conservation status
- Apparently Secure (NatureServe)

Scientific classification
- Kingdom: Animalia
- Phylum: Mollusca
- Class: Gastropoda
- Subclass: Caenogastropoda
- Order: Littorinimorpha
- Family: Assimineidae
- Genus: Angustassiminea
- Species: A. californica

Binomial name
- Angustassiminea californica (Tryon, 1865)

Synonyms
- List: Assiminea californica J. G. Cooper, 1872 (Non Tryon, 1865); Assiminea californica (Tryon, 1865); Cingula californica (Tryon, 1865); Hydrobia californica Tryon, 1865; Syncera magdalenensis Bartsch, 1920 junior subjective synonym

= Angustassiminea californica =

Species of gastropod

Angustassiminea californica is a species of small operculate snail, a terrestrial gastropod mollusk or micromollusk in the family Assimineidae.

== Description ==
The length of the shell attains 6.3 mm.

(Original description) The shell is turbinated (top-shaped) and has a dark horn color. It is covered by an epidermis that is minutely striated and polished. The umbilical region is not perforate. It consists of six rather convex whorls. The spire is elevated, with an acute apex. The suture is well impressed. The aperture is moderate and ovate. The operculum is thin, shining, and dark brown.

== Distribution ==
This species has been found in brackish waters in California, USA.
