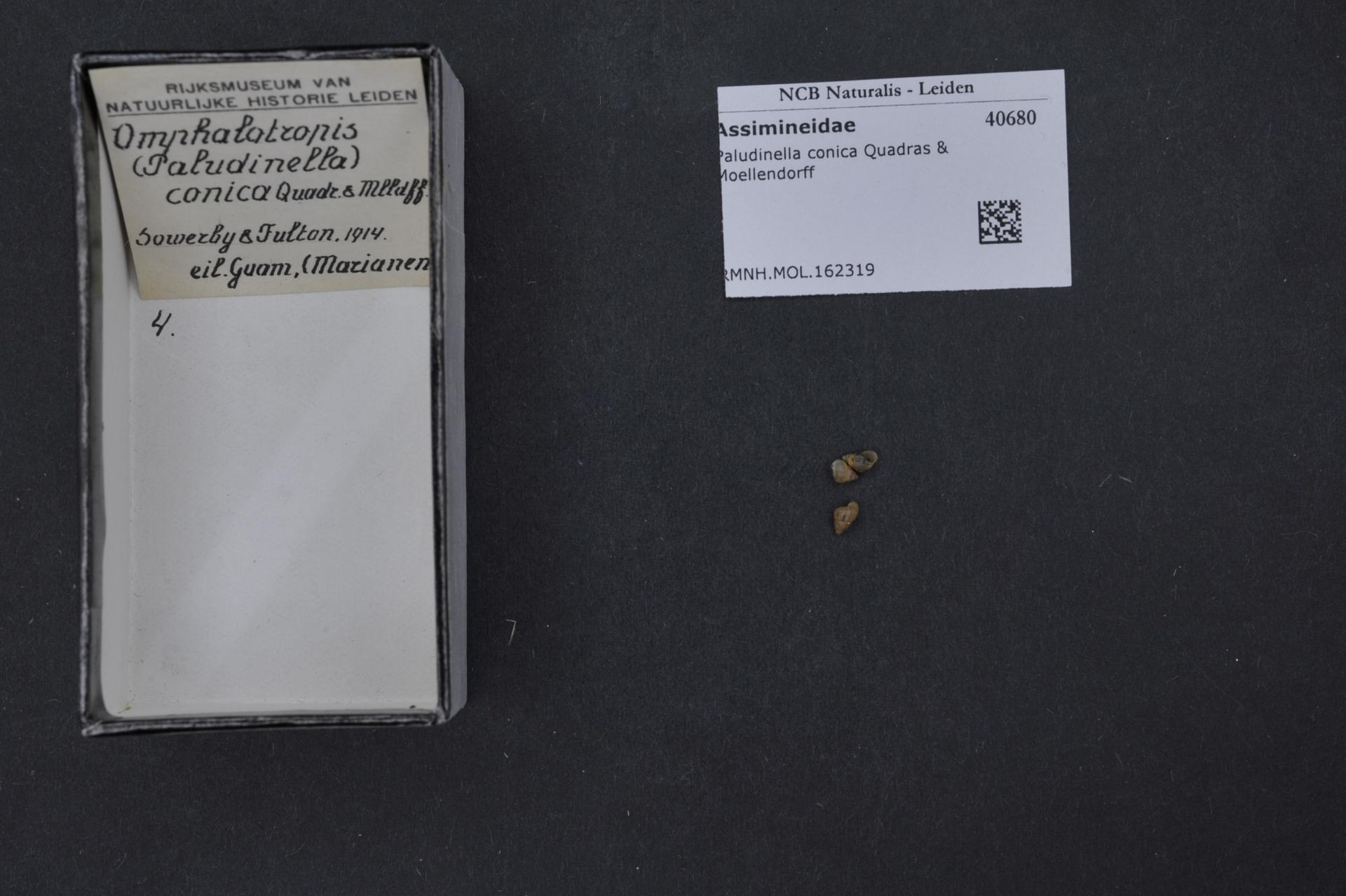

Conservation status
- Data Deficient (IUCN 2.3)

Scientific classification
- Kingdom: Animalia
- Phylum: Mollusca
- Class: Gastropoda
- Subclass: Caenogastropoda
- Order: Littorinimorpha
- Family: Assimineidae
- Genus: Paludinella
- Species: P. conica

Binomial name
- Paludinella conica (Quadras & Möllendorff, 1894)

= Paludinella conica =

Species of gastropod

Paludinella conica is a species of small salt marsh snail with an operculum, an aquatic gastropod mollusk or micromollusk in the family Assimineidae. This species is found in Guam and the Northern Mariana Islands.

== See also ==
List of land snails of the Mariana Islands
