= Conacmella vagans =

Conservation status
- Data Deficient (IUCN 2.3)

Scientific classification
- Kingdom: Animalia
- Phylum: Mollusca
- Class: Gastropoda
- Subclass: Caenogastropoda
- Order: Littorinimorpha
- Family: Assimineidae
- Genus: Conacmella
- Species: C. vagans

Binomial name
- Conacmella vagans Hirase, 1907

Species of gastropod

Conacmella vagans is a species of small salt marsh snails with an operculum, aquatic gastropod mollusks, or micromollusks, in the family Assimineidae. This species is endemic to Japan.
