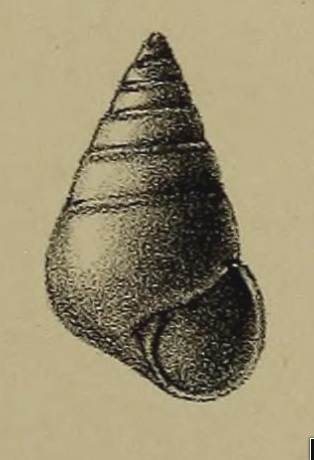
- Shell of Angustassiminea andrewsiana (holotype)

Scientific classification
- Kingdom: Animalia
- Phylum: Mollusca
- Class: Gastropoda
- Subclass: Caenogastropoda
- Order: Littorinimorpha
- Family: Assimineidae
- Genus: Angustassiminea
- Species: A. andrewsiana

Binomial name
- Angustassiminea andrewsiana (E. A. Smith, 1900)

Synonyms
- List: Assiminea andrewsiana E. A. Smith, 1900 (original combination); Paludinella andrewsiana (E. A. Smith, 1900) superseded combination

= Angustassiminea andrewsiana =

Species of gastropod

Angustassiminea andrewsiana is a species of small operculate snail, a terrestrial gastropod mollusk or micromollusk in the family Assimineidae.

== Description ==
The length of the shell attains 4 mm, its diameter 2½ mm.

(Original description in Latin) The elongated shell is conical, and imperforate (lacking an umbilicus). It is reddish-horny in color and scarcely translucent. The surface of the shell is smooth and shining. The shell has seven rather convex whorls, which increase slowly. The whorls are margined below the suture by a pellucid line. The Body whorll is short and rounded. The aperture is oblique, inversely ear-shaped, and nearly equals 1/2 of the total length. The peristome (margin) has margins that are joined by a thin callus. The outer lip is acute and thin, while the inner lip is strongly thickened and reflected.

== Distribution ==
Angustassiminea andrewsiana has been found on Christmas Island
