= Limborelia exquisita =

Scientific classification
- Kingdom: Animalia
- Phylum: Mollusca
- Class: Gastropoda
- Subclass: Caenogastropoda
- Order: Littorinimorpha
- Family: Assimineidae
- Genus: Limborelia
- Species: L. exquisita

Binomial name
- Limborelia exquisita (Pfeiffer, 1855)
- Location of Lord Howe Island

Synonyms
- Hydrocena exquisita Pfeiff., 1855; Omphalotropis pfeifferi Crosse, 1868

Species of land snail

Limborelia exquisita, also known as the exquisite palmleaf snail, is a species of palmleaf snail that is endemic to Australia's Lord Howe Island in the Tasman Sea.

== Description ==
The shell of adult snails is 7–8.5 mm in height, with a diameter of 4–6 mm. It is smooth, yellow-brown to dark brown in colour, with a pointed spire. The animal has a cream to brown body.

== Habitat ==
The snail is found across the island in rainforest and woodland in leaf litter, especially fallen palm leaves, mainly below an elevation of 500 m.
