= Thaanumella cookei =

Conservation status
- Data Deficient (IUCN 2.3)

Scientific classification
- Kingdom: Animalia
- Phylum: Mollusca
- Class: Gastropoda
- Subclass: Caenogastropoda
- Order: Littorinimorpha
- Family: Assimineidae
- Genus: Thaanumella
- Species: T. cookei

Binomial name
- Thaanumella cookei Clench, 1946

Species of gastropod

Thaanumella cookei is a species of salt marsh snail with an operculum, an aquatic gastropod mollusk in the family Assimineidae. This species is endemic to Micronesia.
