= Angustassiminea satumana =

Scientific classification
- Kingdom: Animalia
- Phylum: Mollusca
- Class: Gastropoda
- Subclass: Caenogastropoda
- Order: Littorinimorpha
- Family: Assimineidae
- Genus: Angustassiminea
- Species: A. satumana

Binomial name
- Angustassiminea satumana (T. Habe, 1942)

Synonyms
- List: Assiminea castanea satumana T. Habe, 1942 (basionym)

Species of gastropod

Angustassiminea satumana is a species of small operculate snail, a terrestrial gastropod mollusk or micromollusk in the family Assimineidae.

== Distribution ==
This marine and brackish species occurs off Japan.
