= Austropilula beddomeana =

Scientific classification
- Kingdom: Animalia
- Phylum: Mollusca
- Class: Gastropoda
- Subclass: Caenogastropoda
- Order: Littorinimorpha
- Family: Assimineidae
- Genus: Austropilula
- Species: A. beddomeana

Binomial name
- Austropilula beddomeana (G. Nevill, 1880)

Synonyms
- List: Assiminea (Austropilula) beddomeana G. Nevill, 1880 (unaccepted combination); Assiminea beddomeana G. Nevill, 1880 (original combination); Assiminea beddomiana G. Nevill, 1880 (misspelling)

Species of gastropod

Austropilula beddomeana is a species of small operculate snail, a terrestrial gastropod mollusk or micromollusk in the family Assimineidae.

== Description ==
The length of the shell attains 3 mm, its diameter 3.2 mm.

(Original description in Latin) The shell is depressed-turbinate (low top-shaped), in form somewhat reminiscent of a species of the genus Collonia. It is distinctively obscurely but deeply umbilicate, depressed-conoidal, solid, rather thick, shining and nearly smooth. It is furnished at the base (under a lens) with somewhat obsolete growth striae. The shell is dark tawny-livid in color and it is banded with a white line below the suture, with the band more or less fading near the aperture.

The suture is scarcely distinct, and it is marked by an obscurely impressed and somewhat obsolete line. The spire is obtusely depressed-conoidal, with a very minute apex. It has five whorls. The body whorl is very globosely swollen below, obsoletely sub-subangulate at the periphery, and somewhat flattened inferiorly. It is furnished around the umbilicus with a broad, pale brown, and obscurely white-edged callus.

The aperture is wide and subrounded. The interior is thickened. The margins are joined by an whitish callus that is strong and distinct (sometimes somewhat obsolete) near the aperture.

The columella is very notably and strongly thickened. It is abruptly recurved below, triangular-tongue-shaped, flattened, and excavately rugose (roughened with hollows). It terminates abruptly above into the umbilicus.

The operculum is thin and corneous. It has three whorls (scarcely distinguishable under a lens) that terminate in a subcentral and prominent nucleus.

== Distribution ==
This species has been found in brackish waters in West Bengal, India and in Thailand.
