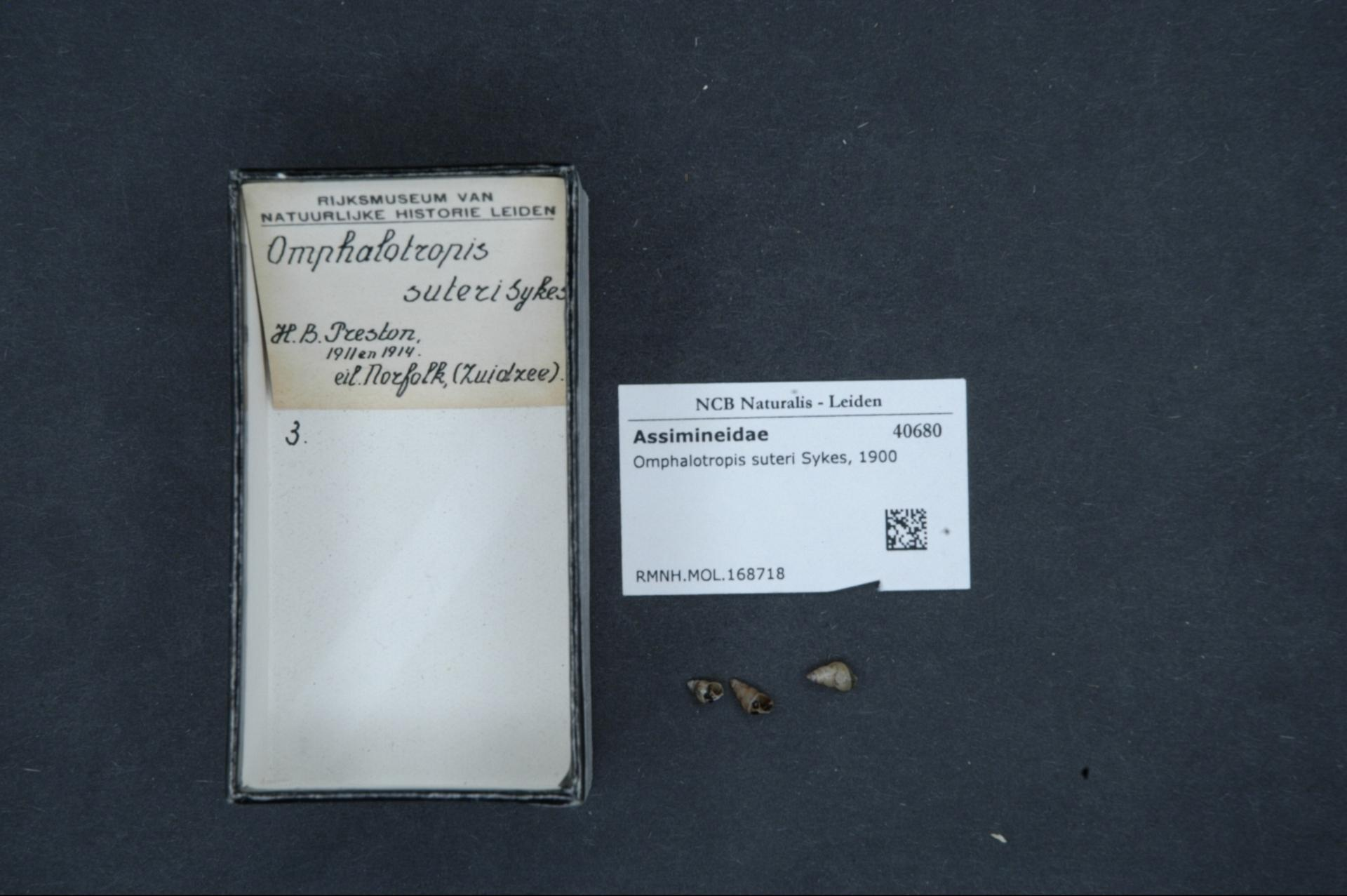
- specimen at Naturalis Biodiversity Center

Conservation status
- Data Deficient (IUCN 2.3)

Scientific classification
- Kingdom: Animalia
- Phylum: Mollusca
- Class: Gastropoda
- Subclass: Caenogastropoda
- Order: Littorinimorpha
- Family: Assimineidae
- Genus: Telmosena
- Species: T. suteri

Binomial name
- Telmosena suteri (Sykes, 1900)

Synonyms
- Omphalotropis suteri Sykes, 1900 (original combination)

= Telmosena suteri =

Species of gastropod

Telmosena suteri is a species of small salt marsh snail with an operculum, aquatic gastropod mollusks, or micromollusks, in the family Assimineidae.

This species is endemic to Norfolk Island.
