= Suterilla imperforata =

Scientific classification
- Kingdom: Animalia
- Phylum: Mollusca
- Class: Gastropoda
- Subclass: Caenogastropoda
- Order: Littorinimorpha
- Family: Assimineidae
- Genus: Suterilla
- Species: S. imperforata

Binomial name
- Suterilla imperforata Fukuda, Ponder & Marshall, 2006

Species of gastropod

Suterilla imperforata is a species of small operculate snail, a marine gastropod mollusc or micromollusc in the family Assimineidae.
