= A. vulgaris =

A. vulgaris may refer to:

- Acetosella vulgaris, a species of flowering plant in the buckwheat family
- Alchemilla vulgaris, common lady's mantle, a herbaceous perennial plant in Europe and Greenland
- Aloe vulgaris, a succulent plant species of the genus Aloe
- Amelanchier vulgaris, commonly known as snowy mespilus, is serviceberry shrub
- Anguilla vulgaris, a species of eel, a snake-like, catadromous fish
- Apamea vulgaris, a moth of the family Noctuidae
- Aquilegia vulgaris, a flowering plant species
- Arcella vulgaris, a single-celled species
- Arion vulgaris or Spanish slug, a species of air-breathing land slug
- Armadillo vulgaris, a widespread European species of woodlouse
- Armeniaca vulgaris, the apricot tree, a tree species
- Artemisia vulgaris, a medicinal plant species
- Assiminea vulgaris, a gastropod mollusc species
- Austroicetes vulgaris, a grasshopper in the genus Austroicetes

== See also ==
- Vulgaris (disambiguation)
