= Limborelia =

Scientific classification
- Kingdom: Animalia
- Phylum: Mollusca
- Class: Gastropoda
- Subclass: Caenogastropoda
- Order: Littorinimorpha
- Superfamily: Truncatelloidea
- Family: Assimineidae
- Genus: Limborelia; Iredale, 1944

Type species
- Hydrocena exquisita L. Pfeiffer, 1855

Genus of gastropods

Limborelia is a genus in the subfamily Omphalotropidinae of palmleaf snails that is endemic to Australia's Lord Howe Island in the Tasman Sea.

== Species ==
Species in the genus include:

- Limborelia exquisita (Pfeiffer, 1855)
- Limborelia innesi (Iredale, 1944)
