= Cryptassiminea =

Scientific classification
- Kingdom: Animalia
- Phylum: Mollusca
- Class: Gastropoda
- Subclass: Caenogastropoda
- Order: Littorinimorpha
- Family: Assimineidae
- Subfamily: Assimineinae
- Genus: Cryptassiminea; Fukuda & Ponder, 2005

Genus of gastropods

Cryptassiminea is a genus of minute operculate snails, marine gastropod molluscs or micromolluscs in the family Assimineidae.

== Species ==
Species within the genus Cryptassiminea include:

- Cryptassiminea adelaidensis Fukuda & Ponder, 2005
- Cryptassiminea glenelgensis Fukuda & Ponder, 2005
- Cryptassiminea insolata Fukuda & Ponder, 2005
- Cryptassiminea kershawi Fukuda & Ponder, 2005
- Cryptassiminea surryensis Fukuda & Ponder, 2005
