= Eussoia =

Scientific classification
- Kingdom: Animalia
- Phylum: Mollusca
- Class: Gastropoda
- Subclass: Caenogastropoda
- Order: Littorinimorpha
- Family: Assimineidae
- Genus: Eussoia; Preston, 1912

Genus of gastropods

Eussoia is a genus of minute operculate snails, marine gastropod mollusks or micromollusks in the family Assimineidae.

== Species ==
Species within the genus Eussoia include:

- Eussoia leptodonta Nevill, 1881
