= Rugapedia =

Scientific classification
- Kingdom: Animalia
- Phylum: Mollusca
- Class: Gastropoda
- Subclass: Caenogastropoda
- Order: Littorinimorpha
- Family: Assimineidae
- Genus: Rugapedia; Fukuda & Ponder, 2004

Genus of gastropods

Rugapedia is a genus of minute operculate snails, marine gastropod mollusks or micromollusks in the family Assimineidae.

== Species ==
Species within the genus Rugapedia include:

- Rugapedia androgyna Fukuda & Ponder, 2004
