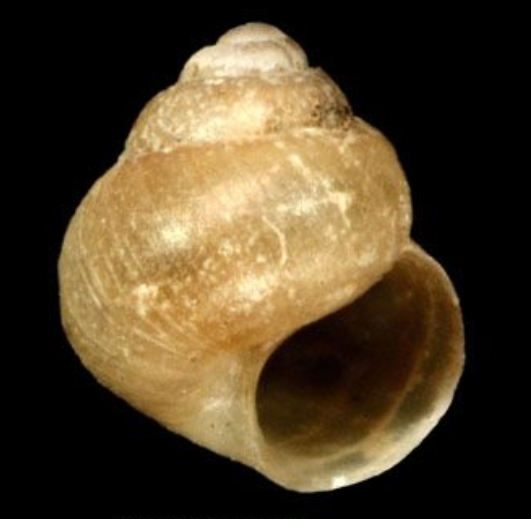
- Shell of Angustassiminea vulgaris (specimen at the Natural History Museum, Rotterdam)

Scientific classification
- Kingdom: Animalia
- Phylum: Mollusca
- Class: Gastropoda
- Subclass: Caenogastropoda
- Order: Littorinimorpha
- Family: Assimineidae
- Genus: Angustassiminea
- Species: A. vulgaris

Binomial name
- Angustassiminea vulgaris (W. H. Webster, 1905)

Synonyms
- List: Assiminea vulgaris (W. H. Webster, 1905) superseded combination; Rissoia vulgaris Webster, 1905; Rissoa (Setia) vulgaris (Webster). Suter, 1913; Notosetia vulgaris (Webster). Iredale, 1915; Tatea hedleyi Brookes, 1924

= Angustassiminea vulgaris =

Species of gastropod

Angustassiminea vulgaris is a species of minute salt marsh snail with an operculum, an aquatic gastropod mollusk in the family Assimineidae.

== Description ==
The length of the shell attains 2.5 mm, its diameter 1.7 mm.

(Described as Tatea hedleyi Brookes, 1924) The small, conical shell is elongate. It is pale buff in colour, with narrow ochraceous bands below the suture. It has a rounded protoconch, and it is without any perceptible sculpture except for a few faint growth-lines. It has 5½ convex whorls, with rather deeply impressed sutures. The protoconch is depressed and consists of one whorl. The spire is about 1½ times the height of the aperture. The body whorl is more than half the height of all the preceding whorls taken together. The aperture is ovate, angled above, and has a rounded, descending base. The peristome is discontinuous, with the margins united by a thin parietal callus. The basal lip is thickened, while the outer lip is thin. The columella is short and rounded. The umbilicus consists of a narrow chink. The operculum is thin, horny, transparent, and paucispiral. The nucleus is subcentral, slightly raised, and nearer the base, upon which are several broad, shallow grooves.

== Radula ==
The dental formula of the stenoglossan radula of Angustassiminea vulgaris is 1 + 1 + 1 + 1 + 1 + 1 + 1. The central tooth has five cusps, and three denticles on each side, below. The inner lateral tooth has six cusps and the outer lateral tooth five. The marginal teeth show 15 pectinate cusps.
