= Duritropis =

Scientific classification
- Kingdom: Animalia
- Phylum: Mollusca
- Class: Gastropoda
- Subclass: Caenogastropoda
- Order: Littorinimorpha
- Superfamily: Truncatelloidea
- Family: Assimineidae
- Genus: Duritropis; Iredale, 1944

Type species
- Omphalotropis brenchleyi Sykes, 1900

Genus of gastropods

Duritropis is a genus of minute, salt-tolerant snails with an operculum, aquatic gastropod mollusks, or micromollusks, in the subfamily Omphalotropidinae of the family Assimineidae.

== Species ==
- Duritropis albocarinata (Mousson, 1873)

Synonyms

- Duritropis brenchleyi (Sykes, 1900): synonym of Duritropis albocarinata (Mousson, 1873) (junior synonym)
- Duritropis fortilirata Iredale, 1945: synonym of Duritropis albocarinata (Mousson, 1873) (junior synonym)
