= Cyclaxyra jelineki =

Scientific classification
- Kingdom: Animalia
- Phylum: Arthropoda
- Class: Insecta
- Order: Coleoptera
- Suborder: Polyphaga
- Infraorder: Cucujiformia
- Superfamily: Cucujoidea
- Family: Cyclaxyridae
- Genus: Cyclaxyra
- Species: C. jelineki

Binomial name
- Cyclaxyra jelineki Gimmel, 2009

Species of beetle

Cyclaxyra jelineki is a species of cucujoid beetle in the family Cyclaxyridae. It is endemic to New Zealand, found on the North Island, South Island, and Stewart Island.
