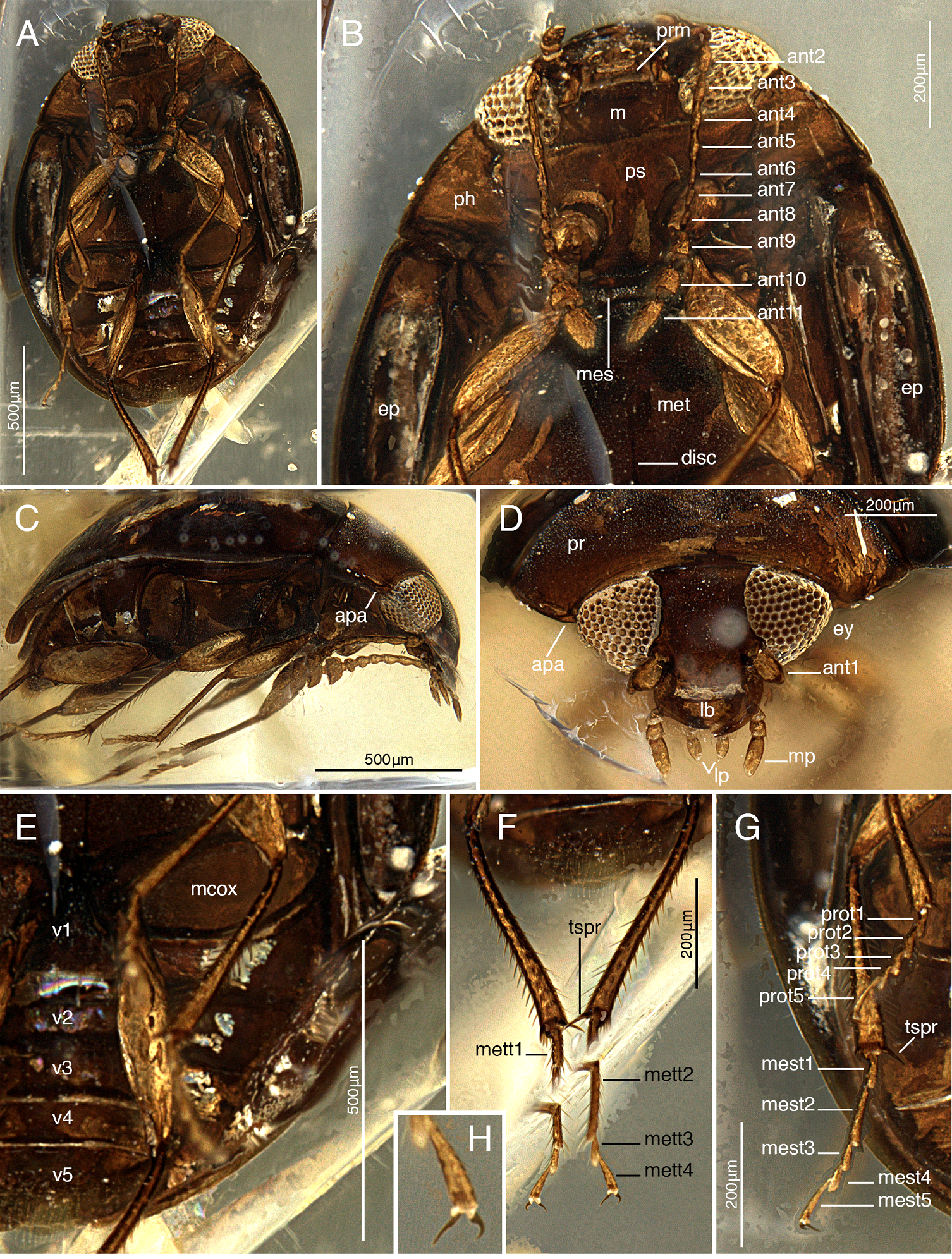
- Electroxyra
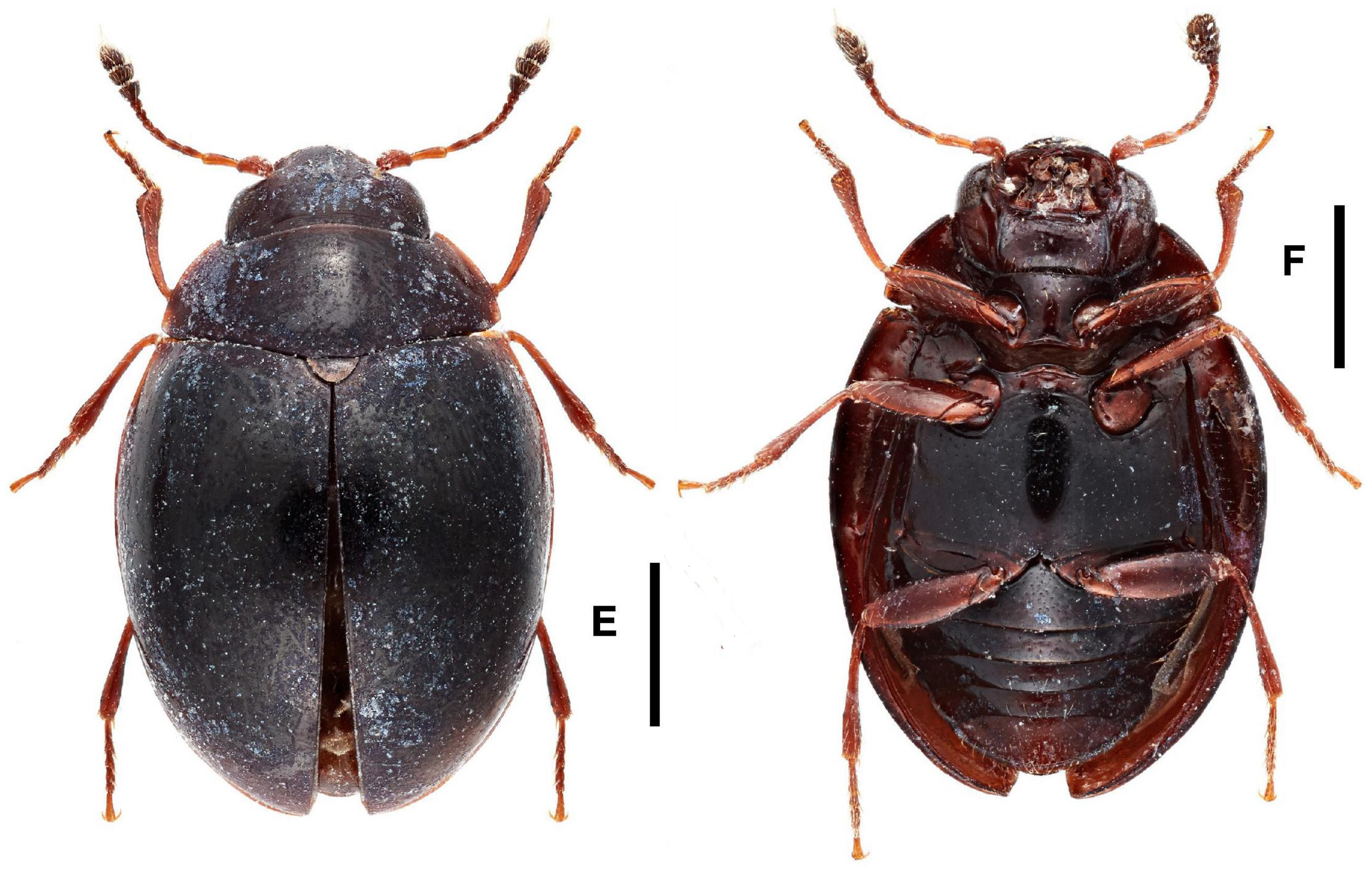
- Specimen of Cyclaxyra politula

Scientific classification
- Kingdom: Animalia
- Phylum: Arthropoda
- Class: Insecta
- Order: Coleoptera
- Suborder: Polyphaga
- Infraorder: Cucujiformia
- Superfamily: Cucujoidea
- Family: Cyclaxyridae; Gimmel, Leschen & Ślipiński, 2009

Genera
- Cyclaxyra Broun, 1893; †Electroxyra Gimmel, Szawaryn, Cai and Leschen, 2019; †Pacyclaxyra Tihelka, Huang and Cai, 2021; †Neolitochropus Lyubarsky and Perkovsky, 2016

= Cyclaxyridae =

Cyclaxyridae Temporal range: Cenomanian–Recent

Family of beetles

Cyclaxyridae are a family of beetles in the superfamily Cucujoidea. The only living genus is Cyclaxyra, with two species endemic to New Zealand. Other species have been named from fossils. They are also known as sooty mould beetles due to the association of Cyclaxyra with sooty mould. The extant species are mycophagous, feeding on spores, conidia, and hyphae.

== Genera ==
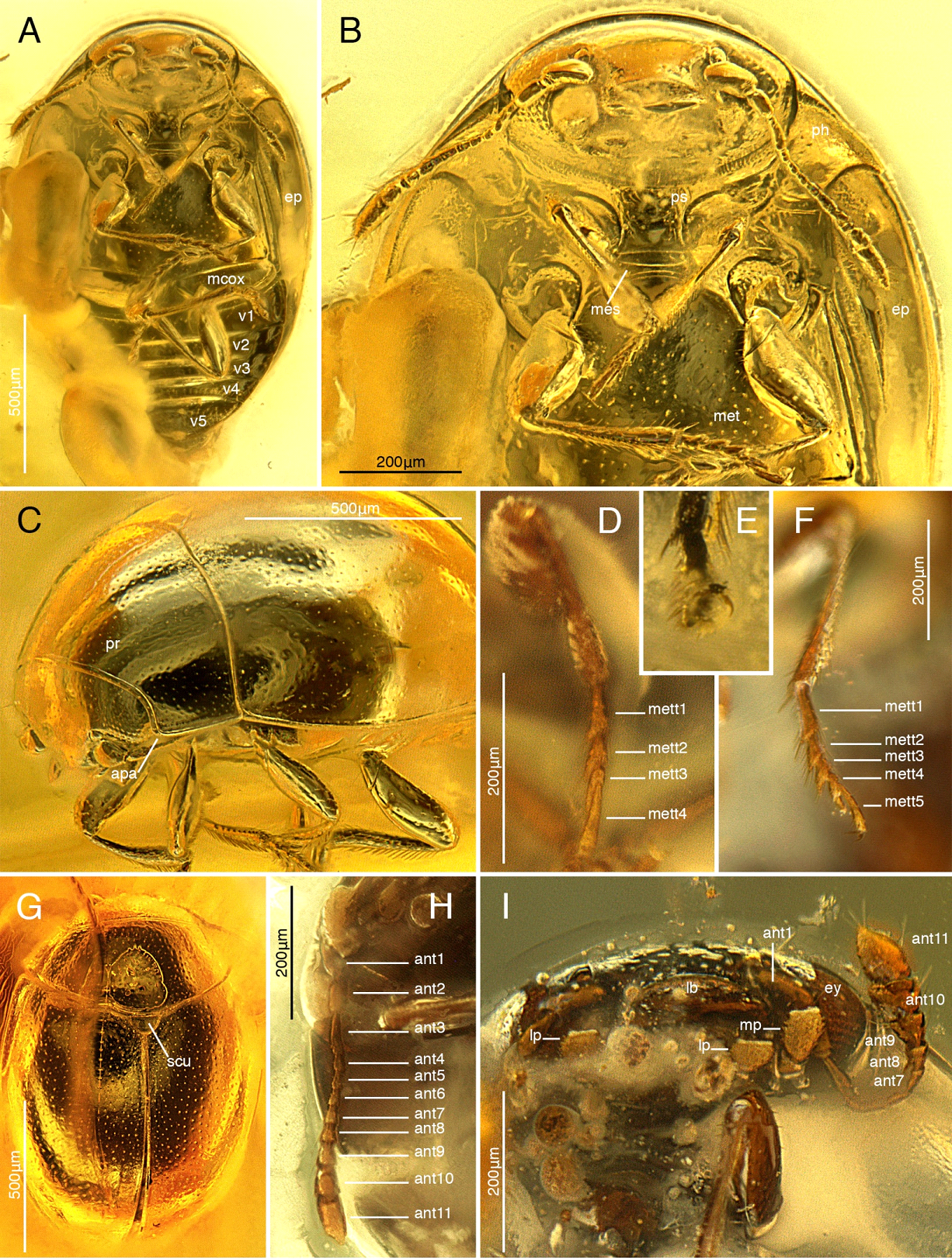
Neolitochropus

- Cyclaxyra Broun, 1893, New Zealand, recent
  - Cyclaxyra jelineki Gimmel, 2009
  - Cyclaxyra politula (Broun, 1881)
- †Electroxyra Gimmel, Szawaryn, Cai and Leschen, 2019
  - Electroxyra cretacea (Wu in Wu, Li and Ding, 2018) Burmese amber, Myanmar, Late Cretaceous (Cenomanian)
- †Pacyclaxyra Tihelka, Huang and Cai, 2021
  - Pacyclaxyra azari Tihelka, Huang and Cai, 2021 Burmese amber, Myanmar, Cenomanian
- †Neolitochropus Lyubarsky and Perkovsky, 2016
  - Neolitochropus hoffeinsorum Lyubarsky & Perkovsky, 2016 Bitterfeld amber, Rovno amber, Baltic amber, Europe, Eocene
