= Conassiminea =

Scientific classification
- Kingdom: Animalia
- Phylum: Mollusca
- Class: Gastropoda
- Subclass: Caenogastropoda
- Order: Littorinimorpha
- Family: Assimineidae
- Genus: Conassiminea; Fukuda & Ponder, 2006

Genus of gastropods

Conassiminea is a genus of minute operculate snails, marine gastropod mollusks or micromollusks in the family Assimineidae.

== Species ==
Species within the genus Conassiminea include:

- Conassiminea studderti Fukuda & Ponder, 2006
- Conassiminea zheni Fukuda & Ponder, 2006
