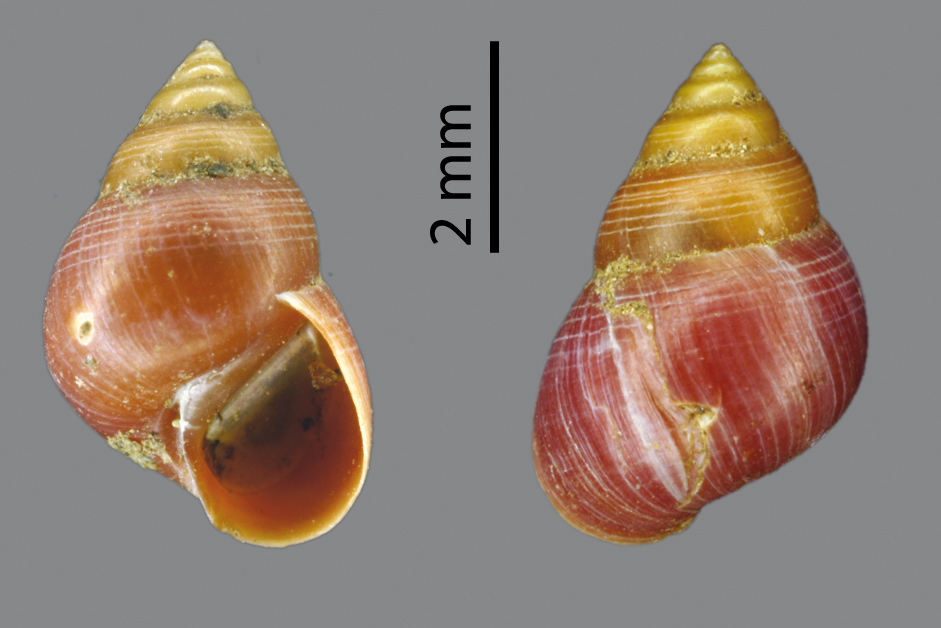
- Shell of Metassiminea philippinica (specimen at MNHN, Paris)

Scientific classification
- Kingdom: Animalia
- Phylum: Mollusca
- Class: Gastropoda
- Subclass: Caenogastropoda
- Order: Littorinimorpha
- Superfamily: Truncatelloidea
- Family: Assimineidae
- Genus: Metassiminea; Thiele, 1927

Type species
- Assiminea philippinica O. Boettger, 1887

Synonyms
- Assiminea (Metassiminea) Thiele, 1927 (original rank)

= Metassiminea =

Genus of gastropods

Metastasis is a genus of minute, salt-tolerant snails with an operculum, aquatic gastropod mollusks, or micromollusks, in the subfamily Ekadantinae of the family Assimineidae.

== Species ==
- Metassiminea philippinica (O. Boettger, 1887)
