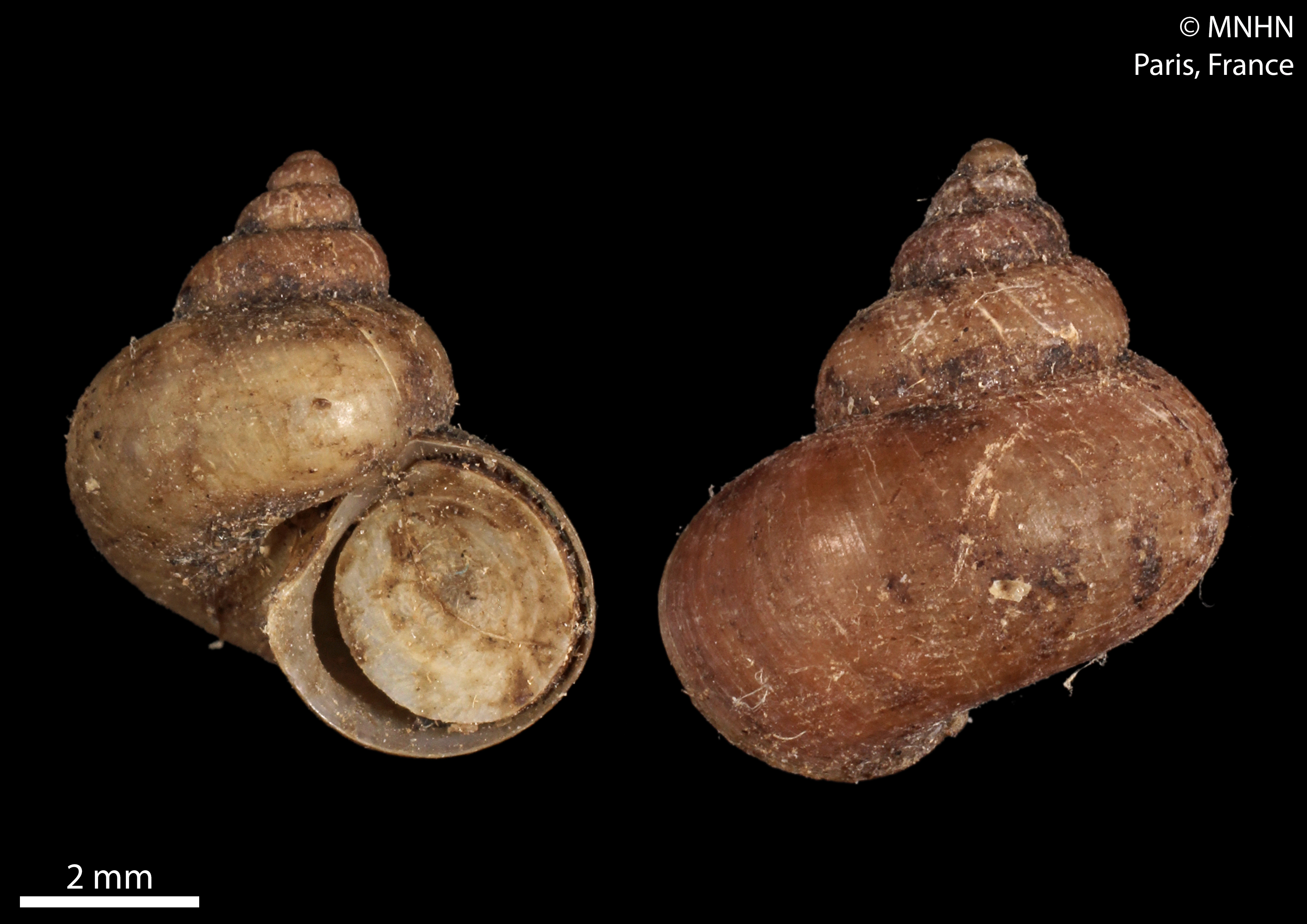
- Shell of Pseudocyclotus levis (specimen at MNHN, Paris)

Scientific classification
- Kingdom: Animalia
- Phylum: Mollusca
- Class: Gastropoda
- Subclass: Caenogastropoda
- Order: Littorinimorpha
- Superfamily: Truncatelloidea
- Family: Assimineidae
- Genus: Pseudocyclotus; Thiele, 1894

Type species
- Cyclostoma novaehiberniae Quoy & Gaimard, 1832

Synonyms
- Adelomorpha Tapparone Canefri, 1886 (Invalid: Junior homonym of Adelomorpha Snellen, 1885 [Lepidoptera]); Adelostoma E. A. Smith, 1885 (invalid: junior homonym of Adelostoma Duponchel, 1827); Cyclotus (Adelomorpha) Tapparone Canefri, 1886 (Invalid: Junior homonym of Adelomorpha Snellen, 1885 [Lepidoptera]

= Pseudocyclotus =

Genus of gastropods

Pseudocyclotus is a genus of minute salt marsh snails with an operculum, terrestrial gastropod mollusks in the subfamily Omphalotropidinae of the family Assimineidae.

== Species ==
- Pseudocyclotus absconditus (C. R. Boettger, 1922)
- Pseudocyclotus acanthoderma (Tapparone Canefri, 1886)
- Pseudocyclotus buehleri I. Rensch, 1937
- Pseudocyclotus campanulatiformis Thiele, 1928
- Pseudocyclotus campanulatus (Schepman, 1919)
- Pseudocyclotus commixtus I. Rensch, 1937
- Pseudocyclotus coultasi Clench, 1957
- Pseudocyclotus crinitus Thiele, 1928
- Pseudocyclotus debilior Iredale, 1941
- Pseudocyclotus exiguus Iredale, 1941
- Pseudocyclotus flavus (Leschke, 1912)
- Pseudocyclotus globosus (E. A. Smith, 1897)
- Pseudocyclotus hermitensis Thiele, 1928
- Pseudocyclotus incendium Clench, 1957
- Pseudocyclotus infans (E. A. Smith, 1884)
- Pseudocyclotus laetus (Möllendorff, 1895)
- Pseudocyclotus levis (L. Pfeiffer, 1855)
- Pseudocyclotus liratulus (E. von Martens, 1864)
- Pseudocyclotus lorentzi (Schepman, 1919)
- Pseudocyclotus novaehiberniae (Quoy & Gaimard, 1832)
- Pseudocyclotus parvus (Hedley, 1891)
- Pseudocyclotus rugatellus (Tapparone Canefri, 1883)
- Pseudocyclotus rutilus van Benthem Jutting, 1963
- Pseudocyclotus tristis (Tapparone Canefri, 1883)
- Pseudocyclotus tunicatus (Tapparone Canefri, 1886)
- Pseudocyclotus wegneri van Benthem Jutting, 1959

Synonyms

- Pseudocyclotus cingulatus Leschke, 1912: synonym of Pseudocyclotus novaehiberniae (Quoy & Gaimard, 1832) (junior synonym)
- Pseudocyclotus lieftincki van Benthem Jutting, 1958: synonym of Dominamaria lieftincki (van Benthem Jutting, 1958) (original combination)
