= Ponapella =

Conservation status
- Data Deficient (IUCN 2.3)

Scientific classification
- Kingdom: Animalia
- Phylum: Mollusca
- Class: Gastropoda
- Subclass: Caenogastropoda
- Order: Littorinimorpha
- Family: Assimineidae
- Subfamily: Omphalotropidinae
- Genus: Ponapella; Clench, 1946
- Species: P. pihapiha

Binomial name
- Ponapella pihapiha Clench, 1946

Species of gastropod

Ponapella pihapiha is a species of small snail with an operculum, an aquatic gastropod mollusc in the family Assimineidae. It is the only species in the genus Ponapella. This species is endemic to Micronesia.
