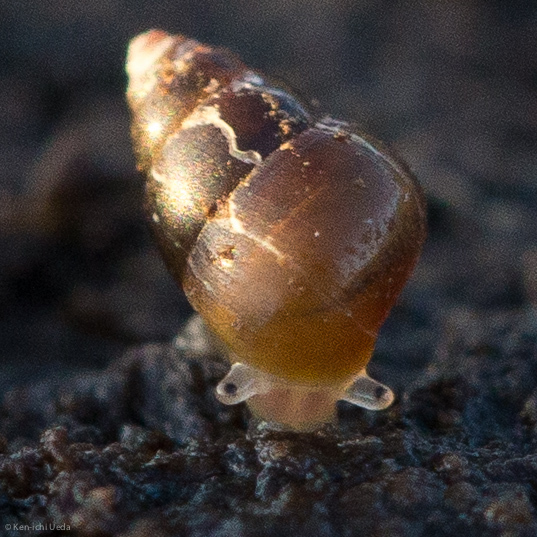
- Angustassiminea californica

Scientific classification
- Kingdom: Animalia
- Phylum: Mollusca
- Class: Gastropoda
- Subclass: Caenogastropoda
- Order: Littorinimorpha
- Superfamily: Truncatelloidea
- Family: Assimineidae
- Genus: Angustassiminea; Habe, 1943

Type species
- Assiminea castanea Westerlund, 1883

Synonyms
- Assiminea (Angustassiminea) Habe, 1943

= Angustassiminea =

Genus of snails

Angustassiminea is a genus of gastropods belonging to the family Assimineidae.

== Species ==
The species of this genus are found in Japan and Northern America. The following species are recognised in the genus Angustassiminea:

- Angustassiminea andrewsiana (E.A.Smith, 1900)
- Angustassiminea californica (Tryon, 1865)
- Angustassiminea castanea (Westerlund, 1883)
- Angustassiminea infima (S.S.Berry, 1947)
- Angustassiminea kyushuensis S. & T.Habe, 1983
- Angustassiminea lucida (Pease, 1869)
- Angustassiminea nitida (Pease, 1865)
- Angustassiminea satumana (Habe, 1942)
- Angustassiminea succinea (L. Pfeiffer, 1840)
- Angustassiminea vulgaris (Webster, 1905)

Species brought into synonymy

- Angustassiminea yoshidayukioi (Kuroda, 1959): synonym of Assiminea yoshidayukioi Kuroda, 1959
