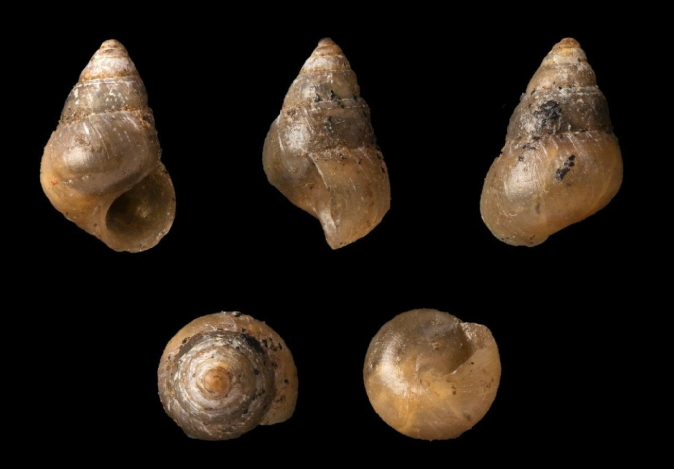
- Shell of Paludinella hidalgoi (syntype at the Natural History Museum, London)

Scientific classification
- Kingdom: Animalia
- Phylum: Mollusca
- Class: Gastropoda
- Subclass: Caenogastropoda
- Order: Littorinimorpha
- Family: Assimineidae
- Genus: Paludinella; Pfeiffer, 1841

Type species
- Cingula globularis Hanley in Thorpe, 1844

Synonyms
- Paludinella (Paludinella) L. Pfeiffer, 1841

= Paludinella =

Genus of gastropods

Paludinella is a genus of minute salt marsh snails with an operculum, aquatic gastropod mollusks or micromollusks, in the family Assimineidae.

== Species ==
The genus Paludinella contains the following species:

- † Paludinella aperta Stache, 1889
- Paludinella conica
- Paludinella corpulenta (van Benthem Jutting, 1963)
- Paludinella debilis (Gould, 1859)
- Paludinella globularis (Hanley in Thorpe, 1844)
- Paludinella halophila B. Rensch, 1934
- Paludinella hidalgoi (Gassies, 1869)
- † Paludinella incerta Stache, 1889
- Paludinella kuiperi Brandt, 1974
- Paludinella kuzuuensis Suzuki, 1937
- Paludinella minima Habe, 1942
- Paludinella miyakoinsularis Minato, 1980
- Paludinella rubida (Gould, 1859)
- Paludinella semperi
- Paludinella sicana (Brugnone, 1876)
- Paludinella solomonensis Dell, 1955
- Paludinella stricta (Gould, 1859)
- Paludinella taiwanensis Habe, 1942
- Paludinella tanegashimae (Pilsbry, 1924)
- Paludinella thonburi Brandt, 1968
- Paludinella vitrea

Species brought into synonymy

- Paludinella (Bythinella): synonym of Bythinella Moquin-Tandon, 1856
- Paludinella (Bythiospeum) Bourguignat, 1882: synonym of Bythiospeum Bourguignat, 1882
- Paludinella (Paludinella) L. Pfeiffer, 1841: synonym of Paludinella L. Pfeiffer, 1841
- Paludinella (Pseudamnicola): synonym of Pseudamnicola Paulucci, 1878
- Paludinella (Rupacilla) Thiele, 1927: synonym of Rupacilla Thiele, 1927 (original rank)
- Paludinella (Schuettiella) Brandt, 1974: synonym of Schuettiella Brandt, 1974 (original rank)
- Paludinella anianensis Paladilhe, 1870: synonym of Bythinella cebennensis (Dupuy, 1851)
- Paludinella armoricana Paladilhe, 1869: synonym of Marstoniopsis armoricana (Paladilhe, 1869) (original combination)
- Paludinella austriaca Frauenfeld, 1856: synonym of Bythinella austriaca (Frauenfeld, 1856) (original combination)
- Paludinella cyclothyra O. Boettger, 1869 †: synonym of Bythinella cyclothyra (O. Boettger, 1869) † (new combination)
- Paludinella daengsvangi Brandt, 1968: synonym of Schuettiella daengsvangi (Brandt, 1968) (original combination)
- Paludinella daitoensis Habe, 1942: synonym of Paludinellassiminea daitoensis (Habe, 1942) (original combination)
- Paludinella dunkeri Frauenfeld, 1857: synonym of Bythinella dunkeri (Frauenfeld, 1857) (original combination)
- Paludinella elliptica Paladilhe, 1874: synonym of Alzoniella elliptica (Paladilhe, 1874) (original combination)
- Paludinella eurystoma Paladilhe, 1870: synonym of Bythinella eurystoma (Paladilhe, 1870) (original combination)
- Paludinella fontinalis F. J. Schmidt, 1847: synonym of Belgrandiella fontinalis (F. J. Schmidt, 1847) (original combination)
- Paludinella gilesi Angas, 1877: synonym of Coxiella gilesi (Angas, 1877) (original combination)
- Paludinella japonica (Pilsbry, 1901): synonym of Paludinellassiminea japonica (Pilsbry, 1901)
- Paludinella javana Thiele, 1927: synonym of Taiwanassiminea javana (Thiele, 1927) (original combination)
- Paludinella kobelti Westerlund, 1892: synonym of Mercuria kobelti (Westerlund, 1892) (original combination)
- Paludinella littorina auct. non delle Chiaje, 1828: synonym of Paludinella globularis (Hanley in Thorpe, 1844)
- Paludinella littorina (delle Chiaje, 1828): synonym of Melarhaphe neritoides (Linnaeus, 1758)
- Paludinella newcombiana Hemphill, 1877: synonym of Littorina subrotundata (Carpenter, 1864)

Notes: Kadolsky (2012) has shown that the real Helix littorina delle Chiaje, 1828, was most probably based on small specimens of Melarhaphe neritoides (Linnaeus, 1758). However, Pfeiffer (1841) based the genus Paludinella on the taxonomic extension given to that name by Philippi (1836), i.e. a misidentified type species. For Paludinella littorina of authors, non delle Chiaje, Kadolsky restored the name Paludinella globularis and, under Art. 70.3 of the code of the International Commission on Zoological Nomenclature, designated the latter as type species of Paludinella.

- Paludinella scalaris Slavík, 1869 †: synonym of Bythinella (Bythinella) scalaris (Slavík, 1869) † (new combination)
- Paludinella servainiana Paladilhe, 1870: synonym of Bythinella servainiana (Paladilhe, 1870) (original combination)
- Paludinella yamamotonis Minato, 1973: synonym of Cavernacmella yamamotonis (Minato, 1973) (original combination)
