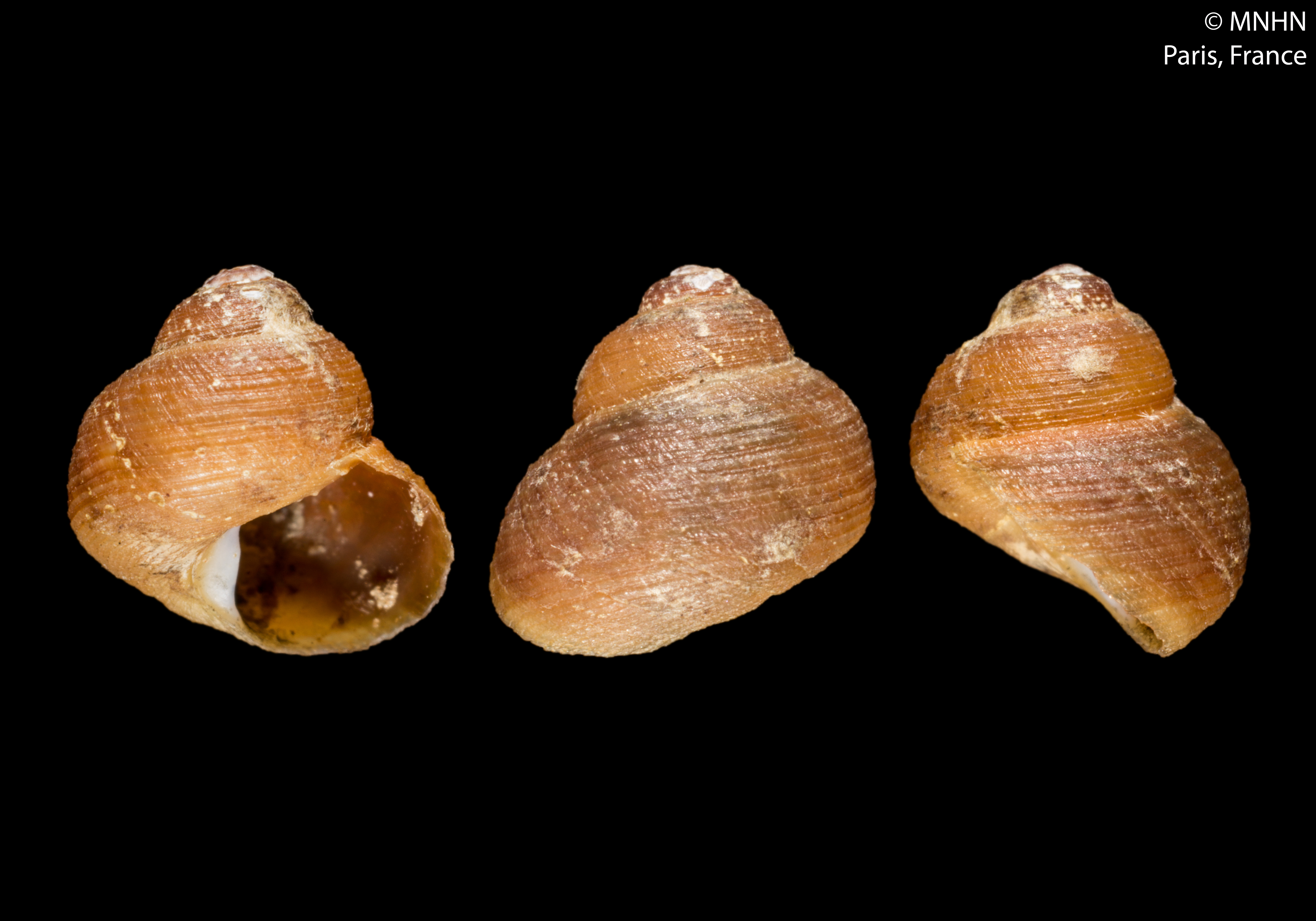
- Shell of Pseudogibbula duponti (syntype at MNHN, Paris)

Scientific classification
- Kingdom: Animalia
- Phylum: Mollusca
- Class: Gastropoda
- Subclass: Caenogastropoda
- Order: Littorinimorpha
- Superfamily: Truncatelloidea
- Family: Assimineidae
- Genus: Pseudogibbula; Dautzenberg, 1891

Type species
- Pseudogibbula duponti Dautzenberg, 1891

= Pseudogibbula =

Genus of gastropods

Pseudogibbula is a genus of minute salt marsh snails with an operculum, terrestrial gastropod mollusks in the subfamily Omphalotropidinae of the family Assimineidae.

== Species ==
- Pseudogibbula duponti Dautzenberg, 1891

== Description ==
The length of the shell attains 7 mm, its diameter 7 mm.

(Original description in French) A rather thin, conical, unperforated shell with an obtuse apex that is almost always eroded. The spire is composed of 3-4 slightly convex whorls, separated by a well-marked suture. These whorls are a little flattened at their upper part; the body whorl is bi-angular and its base is slightly hollowed in the umbilical region. The entire surface of the shell is adorned with numerous decurrent cords, alternately stronger and weaker; there are about ten main ones on the penultimate whorl. Fine, arched growth lines make the cords a little granular. Rhomboidal aperture. Simple, sharp, smooth, and shiny outer lip, but not nacreous, on the inside. The columella slightly arched, oblique, provided near the base with a denticulation produced by the extremity of a spiral columellar funicle which extends into the interior of the shell. The callus of the columella is applied, very shiny, clearly delimited, and connected to the lip by an extremely thin, shiny deposit. The color is a uniform dark maroon brown, with the exception of the columella, which is white. The operculum is horny, thin, paucispiral, with a lateral nucleus, and is a clear yellowish-brown.

== Distribution ==
This species was found in the Democratic Republic of the Congo.
