= Wrayanna =

Conservation status
- Data Deficient (IUCN 2.3)

Scientific classification
- Kingdom: Animalia
- Phylum: Mollusca
- Class: Gastropoda
- Subclass: Caenogastropoda
- Order: Littorinimorpha
- Family: Assimineidae
- Genus: Wrayanna; Clench, 1948
- Species: W. soluta

Binomial name
- Wrayanna soluta (Möllendorff, 1897)

Synonyms
- Diadema solutum Möllendorff, 1897; Garrettia soluta (Möllendorff, 1897)

Monotypic genus of snails

Wrayanna is a monotypic genus of snails in the family Assimineidae. Its sole species, Wrayanna soluta, is known only from Pohnpei, an island in the Caroline Islands of Micronesia.
