= Suterilla =

Scientific classification
- Kingdom: Animalia
- Phylum: Mollusca
- Class: Gastropoda
- Subclass: Caenogastropoda
- Order: Littorinimorpha
- Family: Assimineidae
- Subfamily: Omphalotropidinae
- Genus: Suterilla; Thiele, 1927

Genus of gastropods

Suterilla is a genus of minute operculate snails, marine gastropod molluscs or micromolluscs in the family Assimineidae.

== Species ==
Species within the genus Suterilla include:

- Suterilla climoi Fukuda, Ponder & Marshall, 2006
- Suterilla imperforata Fukuda, Ponder & Marshall, 2006
- Suterilla julieae Fukuda, Ponder & Marshall, 2006
- Suterilla neozelanica (Murdoch, 1899) (synonym: Cirsonella neozelanica Murdoch, 1899)
