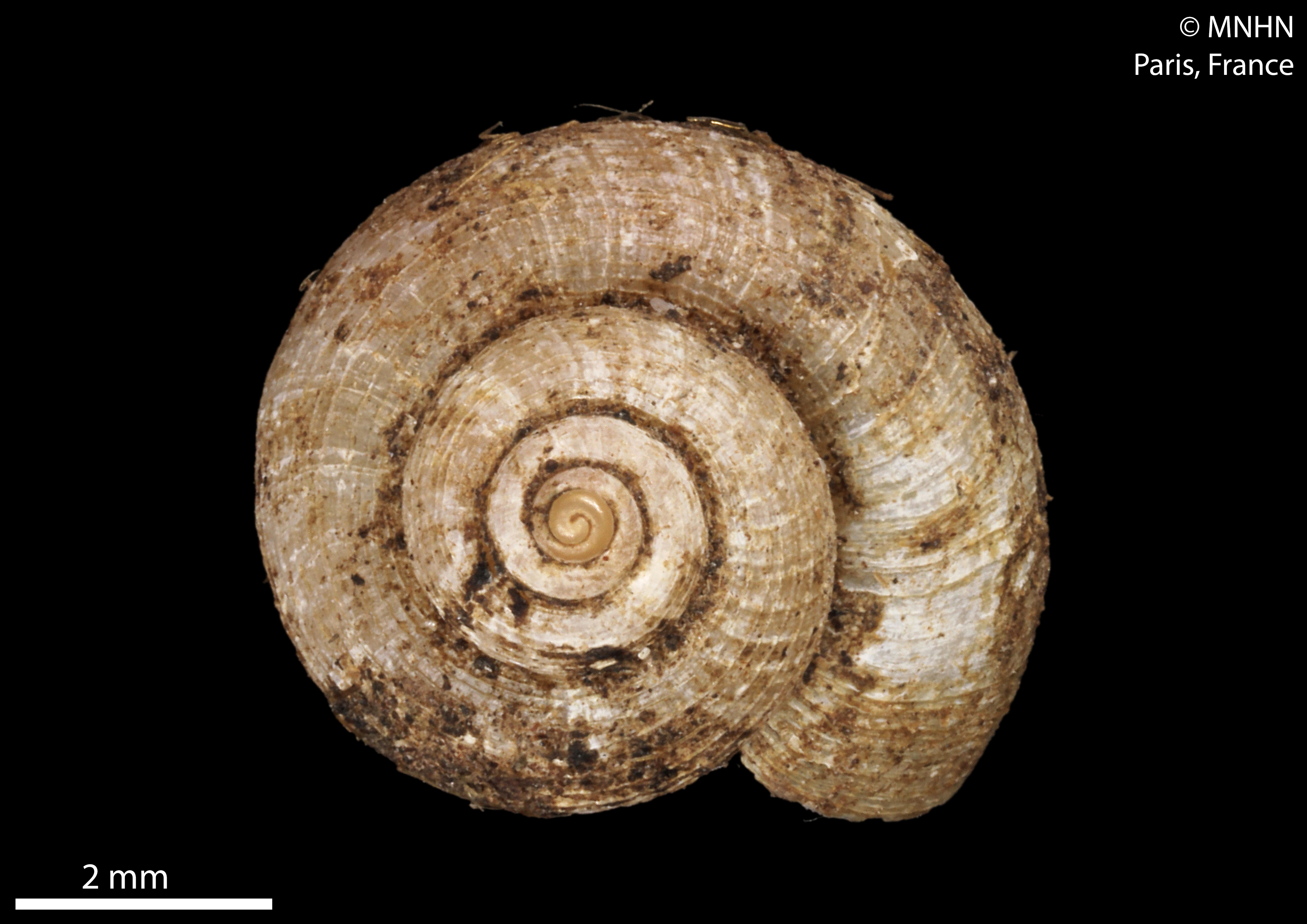
- Shell of Setaepoma hoodi (specimen at MNHN, Paris)

Scientific classification
- Kingdom: Animalia
- Phylum: Mollusca
- Class: Gastropoda
- Subclass: Caenogastropoda
- Order: Littorinimorpha
- Superfamily: Truncatelloidea
- Family: Assimineidae
- Genus: Setaepoma; Dautzenberg, 1891

Type species
- Japonia hedigeri I. Rensch & B. Rensch, 1935

= Setaepoma =

Genus of gastropods

Setaepoma is a genus of minute salt marsh snails with an operculum, terrestrial gastropod mollusks in the subfamily Omphalotropidinae of the family Assimineidae.

== Species ==
- Setaepoma hedigeri (I. Rensch & B. Rensch, 1935)
- Setaepoma hoodi Clench, 1965
- Setaepoma mayri Clench, 1958
