= Opinorelia =

Scientific classification
- Kingdom: Animalia
- Phylum: Mollusca
- Class: Gastropoda
- Subclass: Caenogastropoda
- Order: Littorinimorpha
- Superfamily: Truncatelloidea
- Family: Assimineidae
- Genus: Opinorelia; Iredale, 1944
- Species: O. howeinsulae

Binomial name
- Opinorelia howeinsulae Iredale, 1944
- Location of Lord Howe Island

Genus of gastropods

Opinorelia is a monotypic genus of palmleaf snails that is endemic to Australia's Lord Howe Island in the Tasman Sea.

The species is Opinorelia howeinsulae, also known as the scaly palmleaf snail.

== Description ==
The globosely turbinate to conical shell of adult snails is 4–5.5 mm in height, with a diameter of 2–3.5 mm. It is yellowish-brown in colour, with a pointed spire. The animal's body is pale brown with dark grey cephalic tentacles.

== Habitat ==
The snail occurs across the island, in rainforest and moist woodland, and is usually found in leaf litter, especially fallen palm leaves.
