= Conacmella =

Scientific classification
- Domain: Eukaryota
- Kingdom: Animalia
- Phylum: Mollusca
- Class: Gastropoda
- Subclass: Caenogastropoda
- Order: Littorinimorpha
- Family: Assimineidae
- Genus: Conacmella

species
- See text.

Genus of gastropods

Conacmella is a genus of minute, salt marsh snails with an operculum, aquatic gastropod mollusks, or micromollusks, in the family Assimineidae. It has been found in Pacific islands such as the Japanese Ogasawara Islands.

== Species ==
Species in the genus Conacmella include:

- Conacmella vagans
