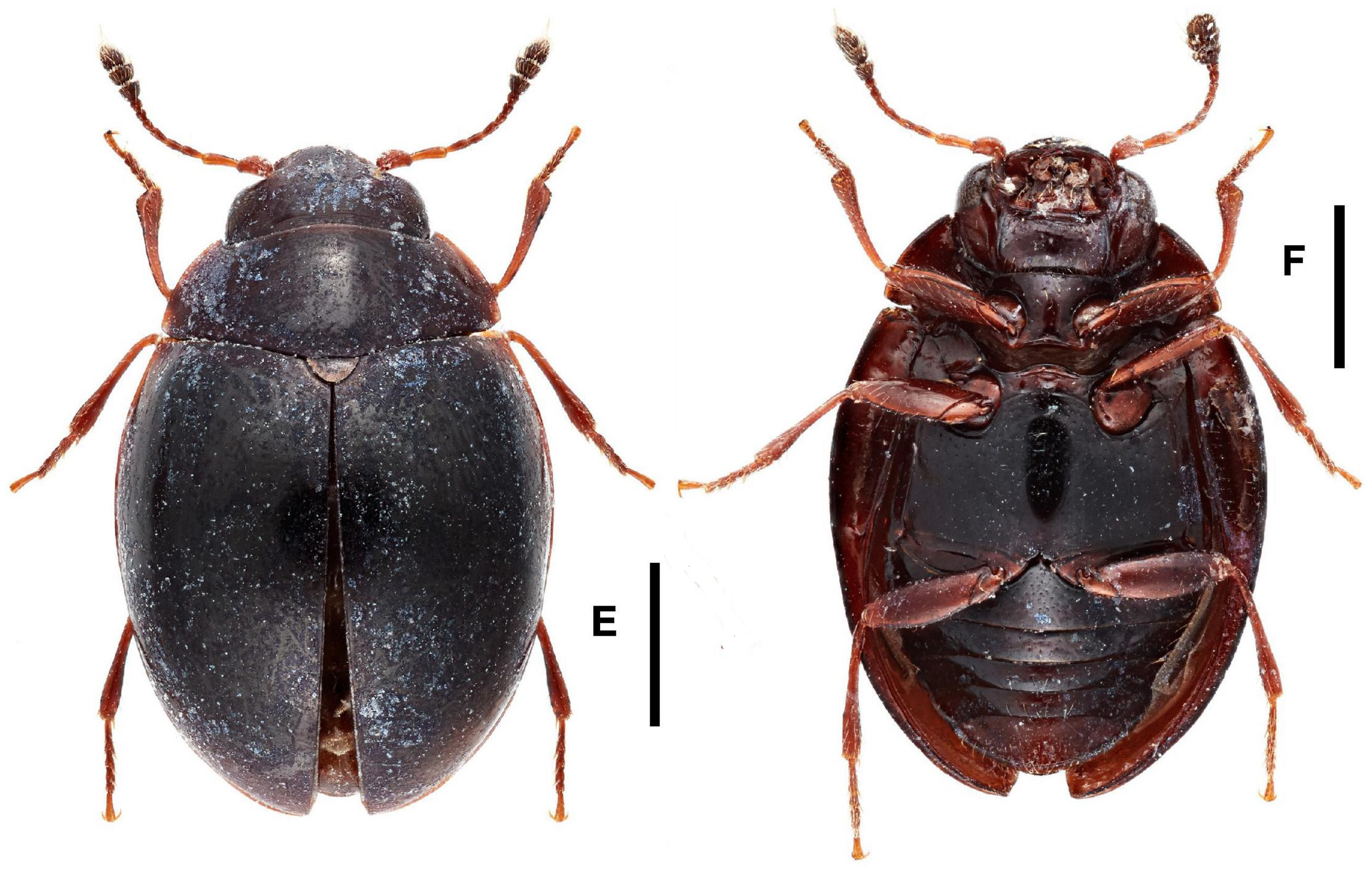

Scientific classification
- Domain: Eukaryota
- Kingdom: Animalia
- Phylum: Arthropoda
- Class: Insecta
- Order: Coleoptera
- Suborder: Polyphaga
- Infraorder: Cucujiformia
- Family: Cyclaxyridae
- Genus: Cyclaxyra
- Species: C. politula

Binomial name
- Cyclaxyra politula (Broun, 1881)

= Cyclaxyra politula =

Species of beetle

Cyclaxyra politula is a species of cucujoid beetle in the family Cyclaxyridae. It is endemic to New Zealand, found on the North Island, South Island, and Stewart Island.
