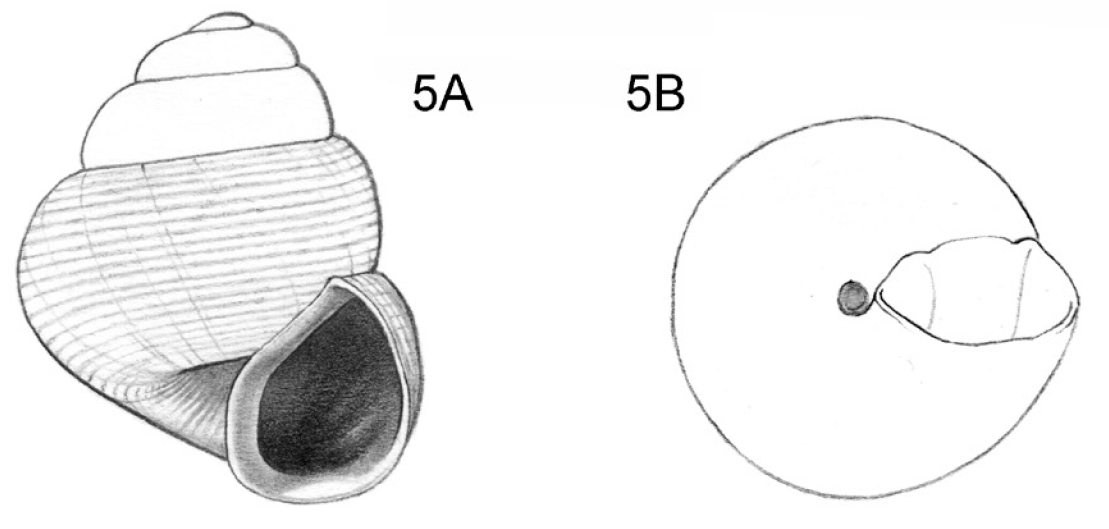
- Shell of Acmella nana

Scientific classification
- Kingdom: Animalia
- Phylum: Mollusca
- Class: Gastropoda
- Subclass: Caenogastropoda
- Order: Littorinimorpha
- Family: Assimineidae
- Genus: Acmella; Blanford, 1869

Synonyms
- Acicula (Acmella) W. T. Blanford, 1869; Dramelia Iredale, 1941; Omphalotropis (Acmella) W. T. Blanford, 1869

= Acmella (gastropod) =

Genus of gastropods

Acmella is a genus of minute, land snails with an operculum, gastropod molluscs, or micromolluscs, in the family Assimineidae.

== Species ==
It consists of the following species:

- Acmella cyrtoglyphe Vermeulen, Liew & Schilthuizen, 2015
- Acmella decolor
- Acmella isseliana
- Acmella minima
- Acmella nana Vermeulen, Liew & Schilthuizen, 2015 (the smallest terrestrial snail, described in 2015)
- Acmella ovoidea Vermeulen, Liew & Schilthuizen, 2015
- Acmella polita Von Moellendorff, 1887
- Acmella striata Vermeulen, Liew & Schilthuizen, 2015
- Acmella subcancellata Vermeulen, Liew & Schilthuizen, 2015
- Acmella sutteri
- Acmella taiwanica
- Acmella tersa
- Acmella umbilicata Vermeulen, Liew & Schilthuizen, 2015
