= Sculptassiminea =

Scientific classification
- Kingdom: Animalia
- Phylum: Mollusca
- Class: Gastropoda
- Subclass: Caenogastropoda
- Order: Littorinimorpha
- Family: Assimineidae
- Genus: Sculptassiminea; Thiele, 1927

Genus of snails

Sculptassiminea is a genus of gastropods belonging to the family Assimineidae.

The species of this genus are found in Southeastern Asia.

Species:

- Sculptassiminea abbotti (Brandt, 1968)
- Sculptassiminea microsculpta (G.Nevill, 1880) (synonym: Assiminea microsculpta G.Nevill, 1880)
- Sculptassiminea spiralis Brandt, 1974
