= Telmosena =

Scientific classification
- Kingdom: Animalia
- Phylum: Mollusca
- Class: Gastropoda
- Subclass: Caenogastropoda
- Order: Littorinimorpha
- Superfamily: Truncatelloidea
- Family: Assimineidae
- Genus: Telmosena; Iredale, 1944

Type species
- Omphalotropis suteri Sykes, 1900

Genus of gastropods

Telmosena is a genus of minute, salt-tolerant snails with an operculum, aquatic gastropod mollusks, or micromollusks, in the subfamily Omphalotropidinae of the family Assimineidae.

== Species ==
- Telmosena suteri (Sykes, 1900)
