= Austropilula =

Scientific classification
- Kingdom: Animalia
- Phylum: Mollusca
- Class: Gastropoda
- Subclass: Caenogastropoda
- Order: Littorinimorpha
- Superfamily: Truncatelloidea
- Family: Assimineidae
- Genus: Austropilula; Thiele, 1927

Type species
- Assiminea beddomeana G. Nevill, 1880

Synonyms
- Assiminea (Austropilula) Thiele, 1927 (original rank)

Genus of snails

Austropilula is a genus of gastropods belonging to the family Assimineidae.

== Species ==
- Austropilula beddomeana (G. Nevill, 1880)
