= Thaanumella =

Scientific classification
- Kingdom: Animalia
- Phylum: Mollusca
- Class: Gastropoda
- Subclass: Caenogastropoda
- Order: Littorinimorpha
- Family: Assimineidae
- Genus: Thaanumella; Clench, 1946

Genus of gastropods

Thaanumella is a genus of minute salt marsh snails with an operculum, aquatic gastropod mollusks in the family Assimineidae.

== Species ==
Species within the genus Thaanumella include:

- Thaanumella angulosa
- Thaanumella cookei
