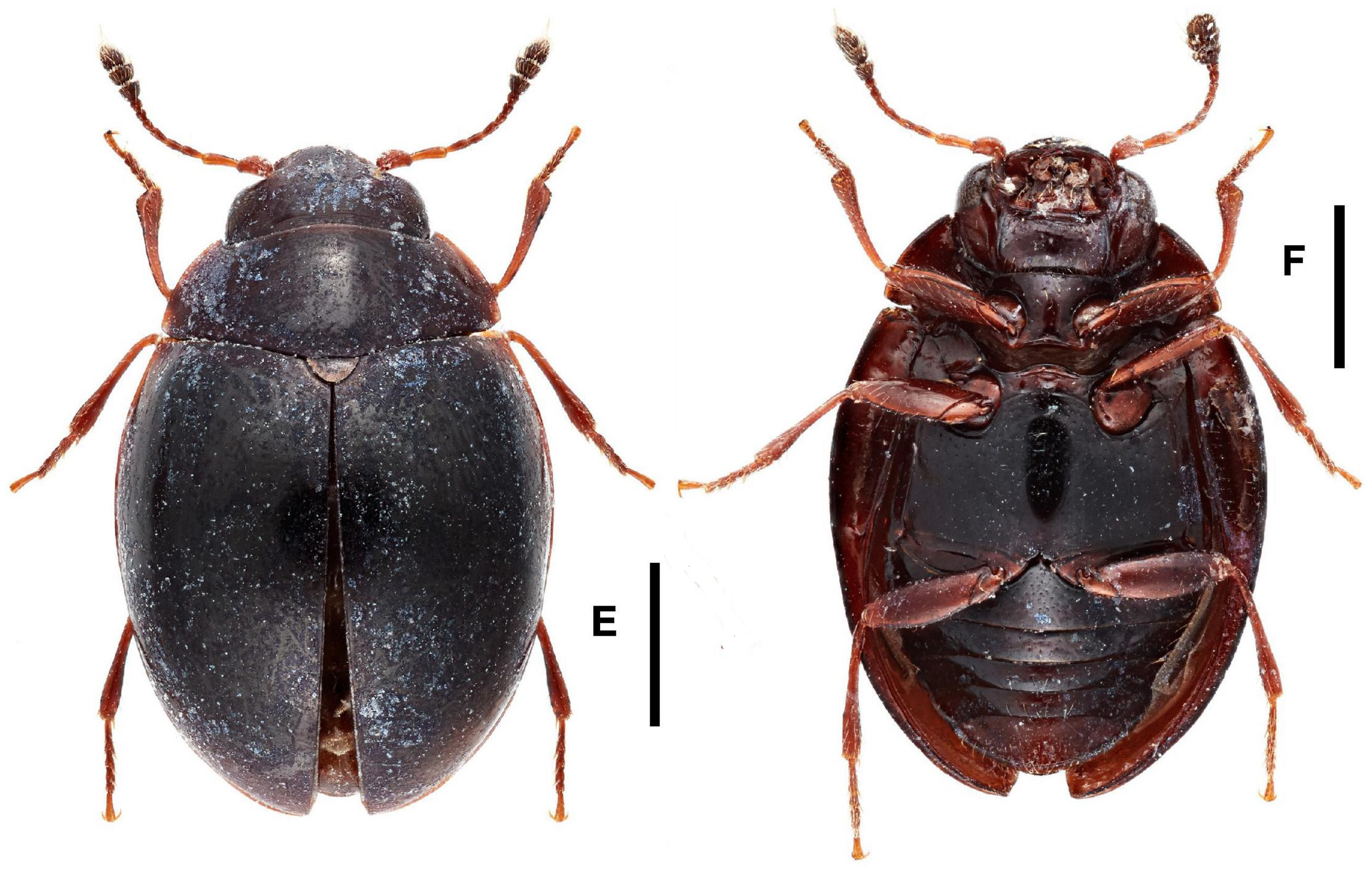
- Cyclaxyra politula

Scientific classification
- Kingdom: Animalia
- Phylum: Arthropoda
- Class: Insecta
- Order: Coleoptera
- Suborder: Polyphaga
- Infraorder: Cucujiformia
- Family: Cyclaxyridae
- Genus: Cyclaxyra; Broun, 1893

Synonyms
- Cyclomorpha Broun, 1881; Melanochroa Broun, 1882

= Cyclaxyra =

Genus of beetles

Cyclaxyra is a genus of cucujoid beetles in the family Cyclaxyridae, and the sole extant genus in the family, others being known only from fossils. There are two described species in Cyclaxyra, found on the North Island, South Island, and Stewart Island of New Zealand. It is an inhabitant of New Zealand's sooty mould habitat and are mycophagous, feeding on spores, conidia, and hyphae.

Cyclaxyra has been treated as part of the family Phalacridae in the past, but is now considered the only living genus of the family Cyclaxyridae. Fossil genera include Neolitochropus from Eocene aged Bitterfeld amber in Germany and Electroxyra (formerly considered a member of Cyclaxyra) from Cenomanian aged Burmese amber from Myanmar.

== Species ==
These two species belong to the genus Cyclaxyra:

- Cyclaxyra jelineki Gimmel, 2009
- Cyclaxyra politula (Broun, 1881)
