= Cyclotropis (gastropod) =

Scientific classification
- Domain: Eukaryota
- Kingdom: Animalia
- Phylum: Mollusca
- Class: Gastropoda
- Subclass: Caenogastropoda
- Order: Littorinimorpha
- Family: Assimineidae
- Genus: Cyclotropis; Tapparone Canefri, 1883

Genus of snails

Cyclotropis is a genus of gastropods belonging to the family Assimineidae.

The species of this genus are found in Malesia and the coasts of Indian Ocean.

Species:

- Cyclotropis bollingi Brandt, 1974
- Cyclotropis carinata (Lea, 1856)
- Cyclotropis papuensis Tapparone Canefri, 1883
- Cyclotropis rigens Iredale, 1941
- Cyclotropis terae Brandt, 1974
