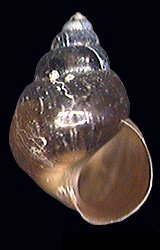
- Apertural view of a shell of Assiminea grayana

Scientific classification
- Kingdom: Animalia
- Phylum: Mollusca
- Class: Gastropoda
- Subclass: Caenogastropoda
- Order: Littorinimorpha
- Superfamily: Truncatelloidea
- Family: Assimineidae; H. Adams & A. Adams, 1856

Subfamilies
- Assimineinae; Ekadantinae; Omphalotropidinae

Diversity
- About 20 freshwater species and numerous amphibious terrestrial/marine species

Synonyms
- Omphalotropidinae Thiele, 1927· accepted, alternate representation; Thaanumellinae Clench, 1946

= Assimineidae =

Assimineidae Temporal range: Cenomanian–Recent

Family of gastropods

Assimineidae is a family of small snails, also known as palmleaf snails, with an operculum, gastropod mollusks or micromollusks in the superfamily Truncatelloidea. Many of these very small snails live in intermediate habitats, being amphibious between saltwater and land; others live in freshwater.

== Distribution ==
The distribution of the Assimineidae is worldwide. The oldest fossils are known from the Cenomanian aged Burmese amber.

== Ecology ==
Various species in this family occur in estuarine habitats, in salt marshes and in freshwater. Some are terrestrial or amphibious.

== Description ==
The shell is small to medium large, more or less egg-conelike shaped. The apertural margin is simple. The operculum is in most cases horny.

Species in this family are characterized by rudimentary cephalic tentacles, a trunklike snout, a foot with a groove and rudimentary to absent ctenidium (a comb-like respiratory apparatus).

== Taxonomy ==
The following three subfamilies were recognized in the taxonomy of Bouchet & Rocroi (2005):

- Subfamily Assimineidae H. Adams & A. Adams, 1856 - synonym: Synceratidae Bartsch, 1920
- Subfamily Ekadantinae Thiele, 1929 - synonyms: Paludinellidae Kobelt, 1878 (n.a.); Cyclotropidae Iredale, 1941
- Subfamily Omphalotropidinae Thiele, 1927 - Realiinae L. Pfeiffer, 1853 (inv.); Adelomorphinae Kobelt, 1906 (inv.); Garrettiinae Kobelt, 1906; Pseudocyclotini Thiele, 1929; Thaanumellinae Clench, 1946; Tutuilanidae Hubendick, 1952

== Genera ==
Genera in the family Assimineidae include:

Genus † Laternoides W. Yu & Y.-H. Xi, 1977

subfamily Assimineinae

- Angustassiminea Habe, 1943
- Assiminea Fleming, 1828 - type genus of Assimineidae, synonym: Assiminia
- Austropilula Thiele, 1927
- Aviassiminea Fukuda & Ponder, 2003
- Conassiminea Fukuda & Ponder, 2006
- Cryptassiminea Fukuda & Ponder, 2005
- Euassiminea Heude, 1882
- Macrassiminea Thiele, 1927
- Ovassiminea Thiele, 1927
- Pseudomphala Heude, 1882
- Sculptassiminea Thiele, 1927

subfamily Ekadantinae

- Acmella Blanford, 1869
- Cavernacmella Habe, 1942
- Cyclotropis Tapparone Canefri, 1883
- Ekadanta Rao, 1928
- Metassiminea Thiele, 1927
- Optediceros Leith, 1853
- Paludinella Pfeiffer, 1841
- Rugapedia Fukuda & Ponder, 2004
- Solenomphala Heude, 1882
- Taiwanassiminea Kuroda & Habe, 1950

subfamily Omphalotropidinae Thiele, 1927 (synonym: Garrettiinae Kobelt, 1906)

- Allepithema Tomlin, 1931
- Anaglyphula B. Rensch, 1932
- Atropis Pease, 1871
- Austroassiminea Solem, Girardi, Slack-Smith & Kendrick, 1982
- Balambania Crosse, 1891
- Chalicopoma Möllendorff, 1894
- Conacmella Thiele, 1925
- Crossilla Thiele, 1927
- Cyclomorpha Pease, 1871
- Ditropisena Iredale, 1933
- Duritropis Iredale, 1944
- Electrina Baird, 1850
- Eussoia Preston, 1912
- Fijianella C. M. Cooke & Clench, 1943
- Garrettia Paetel, 1873
- Kubaryia Clench, 1948
- Leucostele Thiele, 1927
- Limborelia Iredale, 1944
- Nesopoma Clench, 1958
- Omphalotropis Pfeiffer, 1851 - type genus of the subfamily Omphalotropidinae
- Opinorelia Iredale, 1944
- Paludinellassiminea Habe, 1994
- Ponapella Clench, 1946
- Pseudassiminea Thiele, 1927
- Pseudocyclotus Thiele, 1894
- Pseudogibbula Dautzenberg, 1890
- Quadrasiella Moellendorff, 1894
- Rapanella Cooke & Clench, 1943
- Rupacilla Thiele, 1927
- Scalinella Pease, 1867
- Schuettiella Brandt, 1974
- Setaepoma Clench, 1955
- Spiratropis Kobelt & Möllendorff, 1900
- Suterilla Thiele, 1927
- Sychnotropis Möllendorff, 1898
- Telmosena Iredale, 1944
- Thaanumella Clench, 1946
- Turbacmella Thiele, 1927
- Tutuilana Hubendick, 1952
- Wrayanna Clench, 1948

incertae sedis

- Assimineidae incertae sedis vulgaris Webster, 1905
- Assimineidae incertae sedis turrita (W. H. Turton, 1932) (taxon inquirendum)
- Assimineidae incertae sedis turritella (W. H. Turton, 1932) (taxon inquirendum)

Synonyms

- Adelomorpha Tapparone Canefri, 1886: synonym of Pseudocyclotus Thiele, 1894 (Invalid: Junior homonym of Adelomorpha Snellen, 1885 [Lepidoptera])
- Adelostoma E. A. Smith, 1885: synonym of Pseudocyclotus Thiele, 1894 (invalid: junior homonym of Adelostoma Duponchel, 1827)
- Assemania Dollfus, 1912: synonym of Assiminea J. Fleming, 1828 (unjustified emendation)
- Assimania: synonym of Assiminea J. Fleming, 1828 (incorrect spelling of genus name)
- Assiminella Monterosato, 1906: synonym of Paludinella L. Pfeiffer, 1841 (unnecessary substitute name for Paludinella L. Pfeiffer, 1841)
- Assiminia J. Fleming, 1828: synonym of Assiminea J. Fleming, 1828 (alternative original spelling [used in the index p. 557])
- Diadema Pease, 1868: synonym of Garrettia Paetel, 1873 (invalid: junior homonym of Diadema Gray, 1825)
- Dramelia Iredale, 1941: synonym of Acmella W. T. Blanford, 1869 (junior synonym)
- Heteropoma Möllendorff, 1894: synonym of Allepithema Tomlin, 1931 (invalid: junior homonym of Heteropoma Benson, 1856; Allepithema is a replacement name)
- Paludinassiminea Matsubayashi & Habe, 1990: synonym of Solenomphala Heude, 1882 (unavailable name: no type species designated)
- Tribe Pseudocyclotini Thiele, 1929: synonym of Omphalotropidinae Thiele, 1927
- Scalinella Pease, 1868: synonym of Omphalotropis L. Pfeiffer, 1851
- Stenotropis Kobelt & Möllendorff, 1898: synonym of Omphalotropis (Stenotropis) Kobelt & Möllendorff, 1898 represented as Omphalotropis L. Pfeiffer, 1851
- Syncera Gray, 1821 (nomen nudum)
