= Partulina germana =

- Shell of Partulina germana (original image)

Scientific classification
- Kingdom: Animalia
- Phylum: Mollusca
- Class: Gastropoda
- Order: Stylommatophora
- Family: Achatinellidae
- Genus: Partulina
- Species: P. germana

Binomial name
- Partulina germana (Newcomb, 1854)

Synonyms
- Achatinella (Eburnella) germana Newcomb, 1854 alternative representation; Achatinella germana Newcomb, 1854 superseded combination; Partulina (Eburnella) germana (Newcomb, 1854) alternative representation

Species of gastropod

Partulina germana is a species of air-breathing land snail, a terrestrial pulmonate gastropod mollusk in the family Achatinellidae. This species was endemic to Hawaii in the United States.

== Description ==
(Original description) The shell is dextral and ovately conical. There are six flatly convex whorls, and the aperture is ovate. The lip is acute and thickened internally. The columella is brown, short, and tubercular.

The shell is chestnut in colour, with fine, obsolete, darker transverse lines. A white band traverses the last sutural whorl and crosses the body whorl centrally. A broad white band surrounds the columella and fades into the aperture.

== Distribution ==
This species is endemic to Hawaii and occurs on Maui.
