= Partulina porcellana =

- Shell of Partulina porcellana (original image)

Conservation status
- Data Deficient (IUCN 2.3)

- Critically Imperiled (NatureServe)

Scientific classification
- Kingdom: Animalia
- Phylum: Mollusca
- Class: Gastropoda
- Order: Stylommatophora
- Family: Achatinellidae
- Genus: Partulina
- Species: P. porcellana

Binomial name
- Partulina porcellana (Newcomb, 1853)

Species of gastropod

Partulina porcellana is a species of tropical air-breathing land snail, a terrestrial pulmonate gastropod mollusk in the family Achatinellidae. This species is endemic to Hawaii in the United States. The oldest age that species in the genus Partulina reach range from 10 and 19 years.

Subspecies

- Partulina porcellana flemingi D. D. Baldwin, 1906
- Partulina porcellana fulvicans D. D. Baldwin, 1906
- Partulina porcellana wailuaensis (Sykes, 1900)

== Description ==
(Original descriptin in Latin) The shell is rather solid, conical, polished, and shining. There are five rounded whorls, which are marginate above. The aperture is ovate. The outer lip is expanded, with a thin margin and is thickened internally. The columella is short and tubercular.

The shell is porcelain-white in colour and bears a pale yellowish-brown band encircling each whorl; there are two such bands on the body whorl.

This land snail's shell has colors that are a range of brown and it may also have white rings spiraling around its shell. The direction of the shell's coil goes to the right, falling under the dextrally coiled category. The snail itself has a slightly transparent appearance and has a gray appearance. The Partulina porcellana is less than two inches long and has a symmetrical body.

== Distribution & Habitat ==
Partulina porcellana is categorized as a G1 Critically Imperiled species, meaning that it's at high risk of extinction. It's endemic to Maui, Hawaii and has been found throughout Makawao and Kipahulu. The population of the species is in small numbers as its reproductive rate is low. Partulina porcellana can be found on the island of Maui, specifically in Kipahulu Valley, mainly residing on Antidesma platyphyllum. Due to invasion of Psidium cattleianum, commonly known as strawberry guava, the Partulina porcellana's habitat is at risk. This species is the rarest throughout the Valley.
