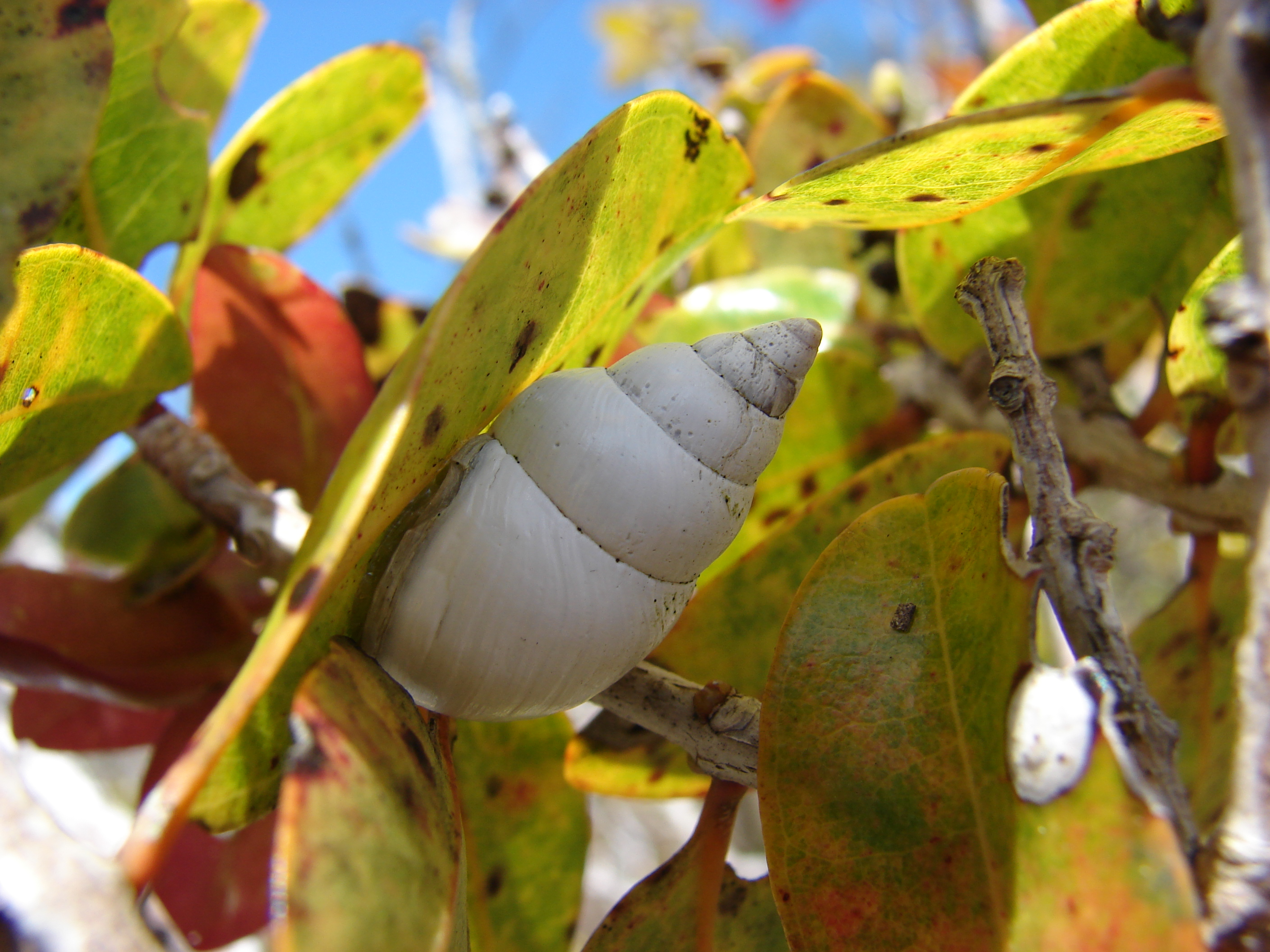

- Shell of Partulina perdix (specimen at Bailey-Matthews National Shell Museum)

Conservation status
- Endangered (IUCN 2.3)

- Critically Imperiled (NatureServe)

Scientific classification
- Kingdom: Animalia
- Phylum: Mollusca
- Class: Gastropoda
- Order: Stylommatophora
- Family: Achatinellidae
- Genus: Partulina
- Species: P. perdix

Binomial name
- Partulina perdix (Reeve, 1850)

Synonyms
- Achatinella perdix Reeve, 1850 superseded combination; Achatinella pyramidalis Gulick, 1856 junior subjective synonym; Partulina (Partulina) perdix (Reeve, 1850) alternative representation

= Partulina perdix =

Species of gastropod

Partulina perdix, formerly known as Achatinella perdix, is a species of tropical air-breathing land snail, a terrestrial pulmonate gastropod mollusk in the family Achatinellidae.

This species is endemic to Maui, Hawaii, which is in the United States.

== Description ==
The shell of P. perdix is sinistral.

(Described as Achatinella pyramidalis) The shell is dextral, though very rarely sinistral. It is imperforate, pyramidal, rather solid, and shining. It is chestnut or ash-brown, with a white or yellowish band encircling the base and oblique white and brown markings on the second and third whorls. The interior of the aperture is bluish-white. The apex is subacute, and the spire is regularly conical, though sometimes decollated.

The shell comprises six and a half convex whorls, each bordered with white. Their surfaces are finely striated transversely and microscopically crosshatched by faintly impressed, wrinkled spiral lines. The body whorl is evenly rounded and accounts for approximately 65% of the shell’s total length. The columellar fold is well developed, white, and oblique.

The aperture is rather oblique and semioval. The peristome is thickened internally and very slightly reflected. Its columellar margin is dilated and either adnate or slightly detached, while the parietal margin is absent.

The length of the shell measures 0.85 inch (21.6 mm); its diameter 0.45 inch (11.4 mm). The length of the aperture measures 0.38 inch (approximately 9.7 mm).

== Distribution and habitat ==
Partulina perdix are endemic to Maui in the Hawaiian Islands. They are found across Panaewa to Honolua, and Hanaula to Puu Kukui, but originally resided in Lahaina, Huelo, Olinda and Waihee, Maui. Partulina perdix live in terrestrial and arboreal habitats.

== Conservation status ==
These snails are a priority species and therefore are under the care of the snail extinction prevention program. Along with other Hawaiian tree snails, they are critically endangered.
