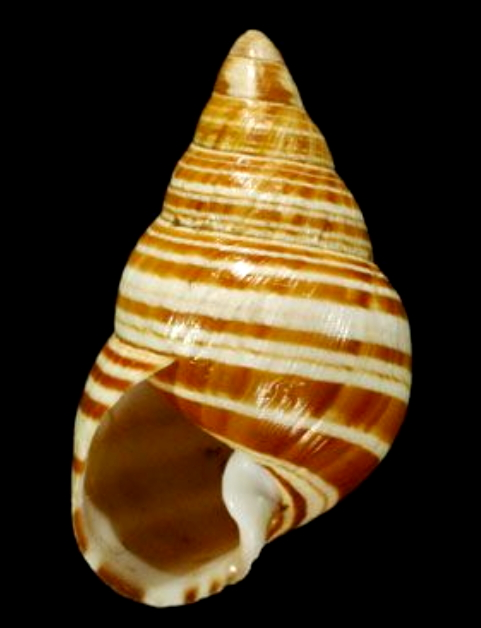
- Sinistral shell of Partulina splendida (specimen at Natural History Museum Rotterdamà

Conservation status
- Endangered (IUCN 2.3)

- Critically Imperiled (NatureServe)

Scientific classification
- Kingdom: Animalia
- Phylum: Mollusca
- Class: Gastropoda
- Order: Stylommatophora
- Family: Achatinellidae
- Genus: Partulina
- Species: P. splendida

Binomial name
- Partulina splendida (Newcomb, 1853)

Synonyms
- Achatinella baileyana Gulick, 1856 junior subjective synonym; Achatinella gouldi Newcomb, 1853 misspelling - incorrect subsequent spelling; Achatinella gouldii Newcomb, 1853 junior homonym; Achatinella myrrhea L. Pfeiffer, 1859 nomen nudum; Achatinella splendida Newcomb, 1853 superseded combination; Achatinella talpina Gulick, 1856 junior subjective synonym; Partulina (Partulina) splendida (Newcomb, 1853) alternative representation; Partulina (Partulina) talpina (Gulick, 1856); Partulina gouldi Newcomb, 1853 misspelling - incorrect subsequent spelling; Partulina gouldi var. perfecta Pilsbry, 1912 junior subjective synonym; Partulina talpina (Gulick, 1856)

= Splendid partulina =

Species of gastropod

The splendid partulina, scientific name Partulina splendida, is a species of tropical air-breathing land snail, a terrestrial pulmonate gastropod mollusk in the family Achatinellidae.

== Habitat ==
Partulina splendida is endemic to West Maui, and commonly found in three general areas: Panaewa, Kaulalewelewe, and Hanaula. It inhabits diverse habitats within these areas, including forest and shrublands.

== Description ==
The shell measures 25.4 mm in length and 14.0 mm in diameter.

Partulina splendida shells have a smooth texture with a whorl shape, featuring swirling colors of brown and white.

(Original description) The shell is sinistral and solid, characterized by an ovate-acuminate form and a surface that is finely decorated with decussated striae. The suture is moderately impressed and distinctly margined, separating six whorls. The body whorl is somewhat inflated. The aperture is ovate in shape, featuring an expanded lip and a short, broad, and twisted columella.

The two upper whorls are tessellated with a combination of chestnut and white. The lower whorl is particularly striking, as it displays numerous chestnut-colored transverse lines and fillets traced across a polished white ground. These markings are notable for their precision; they are correctly lined on their superior edges, while their inferior edges are irregularly serrated.

== Conservation status ==
As of July 7, 1990, the species' conservation status remained as G1 indicating rarity. The state conservation status, designated as S1, which states that the species is rare and is vulnerable to extinction due to its low population.
