= Partulina errans =

- Shell of Partulina errans

Scientific classification
- Kingdom: Animalia
- Phylum: Mollusca
- Class: Gastropoda
- Order: Stylommatophora
- Family: Achatinellidae
- Genus: Partulina
- Species: P. errans

Binomial name
- Partulina errans Pilsbry & C. M. Cooke, 1913

Synonyms
- Partulina (Baldwinia) errans Pilsbry & C. M. Cooke, 1913 alternative representation; Partulina (Baldwinia) physa var. errans Pilsbry & C. M. Cooke, 1913 superseded rank

Species of gastropod

Partulina errans is a species of tropical air-breathing land snail, a terrestrial pulmonate gastropod mollusk in the family Achatinellidae.

== Description ==
The length of the shell attains 18 mm, its diameter 11 mm.

(Original description) The thin shell is sinistral. It is more slender than usual in Partulina physa. It is minutely perforate or almost imperforate, smooth, and slightly shining. Under a lens, it displays minute growth lines and is closely and distinctly striated spirally throughout; the striae appear rippled.

The embryonic shell bears broad axial brown stripes, as in P. physa. The neanic whorls are marked with brown zigzag stripes on a white or cream ground. On the body whorl, the stripes are usually interrupted by a light band below the periphery and become irregular on the base. Sometimes, the brown markings are very faint.

The six whorls are rather strongly convex. The aperture varies from purplish-brown to faint pink within. The lip is thin and very narrowly expanded, with a white-edged interior. The columella is reflexed, as in P. physa.

== Distribution ==
This species is endemic to Hawaii.
