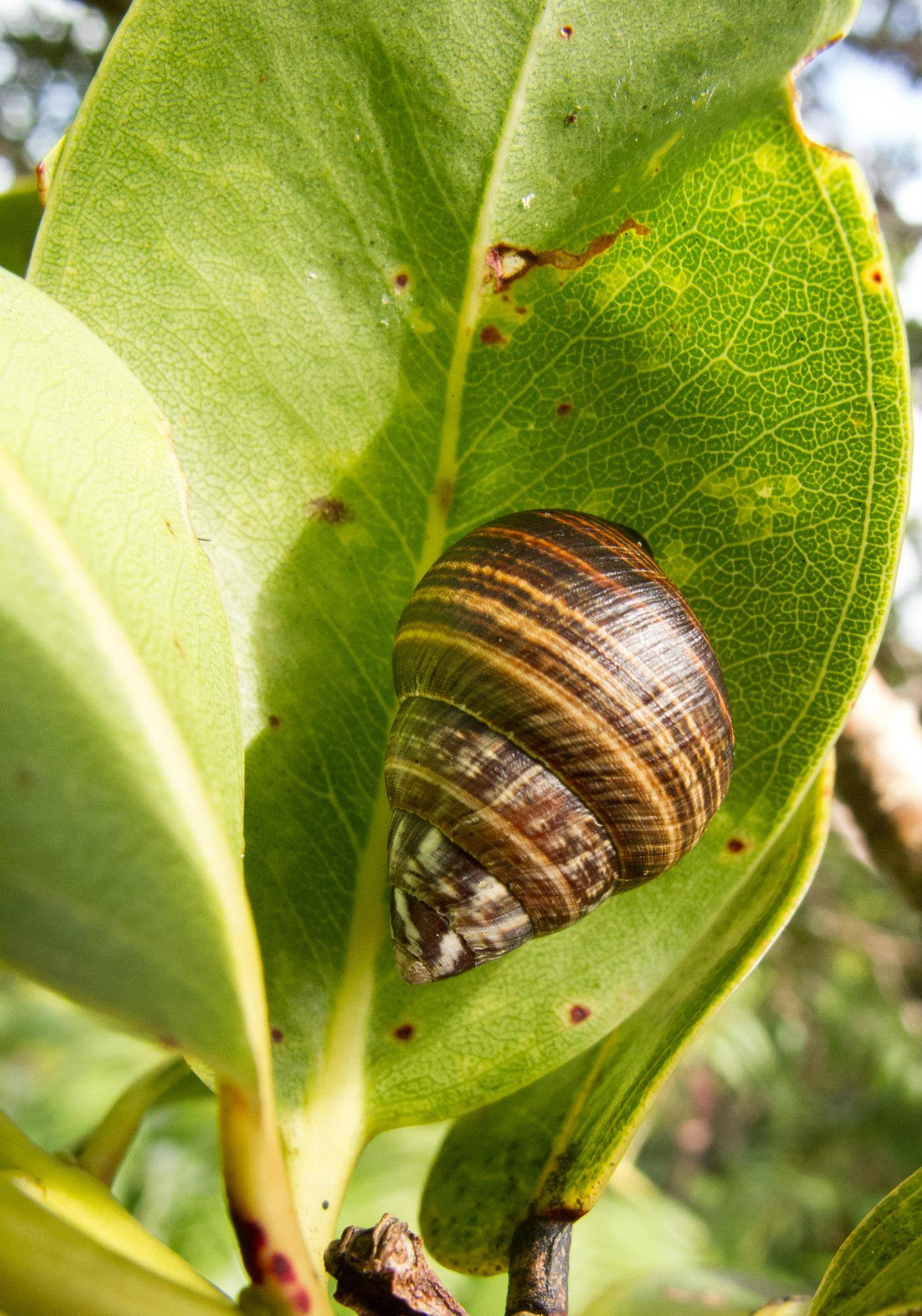

Scientific classification
- Kingdom: Animalia
- Phylum: Mollusca
- Class: Gastropoda
- Order: Stylommatophora
- Family: Achatinellidae
- Genus: Partulina
- Species: P. tessellata

Binomial name
- Partulina tessellata (Newcomb, 1853)

Synonyms
- Achatinella tessellata Newcomb, 1853 superseded combination; Partulina (Partulina) tessellata (Newcomb, 1853· alternative representation

= Partulina tessellata =

Species of gastropod

Partulina tessellata is a species of tropical air-breathing land snail, a terrestrial pulmonate gastropod mollusk in the family Achatinellidae.

Subspecies

- Partulina tessellata meyeri Borcherding, 1901

== Description ==
The length of the shell measures approximately 25.4–27.9 mm; its diameter 15.2 mm.

(Original description) The sinistral shell is ovate-oblong, and solid, with minute, intersecting striae. It is white or fawn-colored, either unbanded or variously marked with black or chestnut bands, while the upper whorls invariably display a tessellated pattern of black and white. The whorls are convex, and the body whorl is somewhat inflated.

The aperture is white or roseate, ovate, and flared below. The columella is short and bears a broad callus, while the columellar lip is broad and slightly reflected.

== Distribution ==
This species is endemic to Hawaii and occurs on Molokai..
