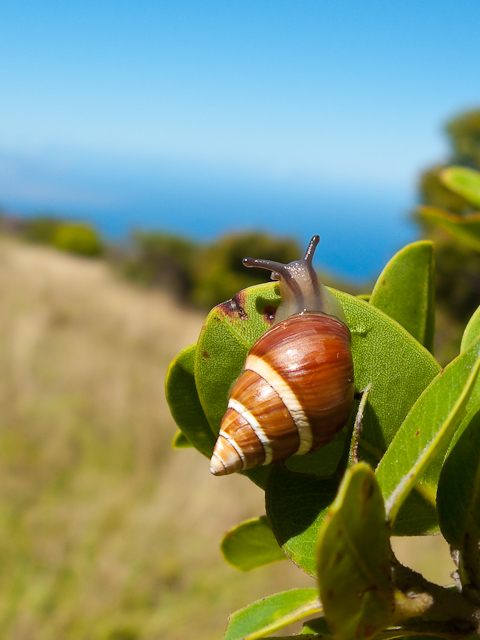

Conservation status
- Endangered (IUCN 2.3)

- Critically Imperiled (NatureServe)

Scientific classification
- Kingdom: Animalia
- Phylum: Mollusca
- Class: Gastropoda
- Order: Stylommatophora
- Family: Achatinellidae
- Genus: Partulina
- Species: P. redfieldi

Binomial name
- Partulina redfieldi (Newcomb, 1853)

Synonyms
- Achatinella redfieldi Newcomb, 1853 superseded combination; Partulina (Partulina) redfieldi (Newcomb, 1853) alternative representation; Partulina (Partulina) redfieldii [sic] misspelling - incorrect subsequent spelling; Partulina redfieldii [sic] misspelling - incorrect subsequent spelling

= Partulina redfieldi =

Species of gastropod

Partulina redfieldi is a species of tropical air-breathing land snail, a terrestrial pulmonate gastropod mollusk in the family Achatinellidae.

Subspecies

- Partulina redfieldi kamaloensis Pilsbry & C. M. Cooke, 1914
- Partulina redfieldi redfieldi (Newcomb, 1853)

== Description and biology ==
(Original description) The shell is sinistral, elongate, conical, and longitudinally striated. It is light fawn in colour, passing into deep chestnut, and is paler above. It is either plain or bears transverse chestnut bands with obscure undulations on the third whorl only. A white band also traverses the suture.

There are six whorls, separated by a well-impressed, slightly marginate suture. The aperture is subovate. The columella is brown, flat, and twisted. The lip is slightly reflected and has the same colour as the columella.

The length of the shell attains 25.4 mm; its diameter 11.43 mm.

Partulina redfieldi appears in various colors, and the shells are found to be polymorphic, exhibiting a wide range of white to brown shades with varying numbers of white or brown bands. Partulina redfieldi must reach 3 to 5 years of age before it can reproduce and are only capable of producing up to 5 babies every year. The snail has a juvenile mortality rate of 42%.

== Distribution and habitat ==
Partulina redfieldi are endemic to the island of Molokai and Maui Hawaii. This species is commonly found on the smooth leaves of the 'ohi'a lehua tree, Metrosideros polymorpha, also endemic to the Hawaiian Islands.

== Population decline ==
From 1983 to 1995, the general population of Partulina redfieldi grew significantly from 100% to 900%. Since 1995, the population has decreased by 85%, due to rat predation, which has shown itself to be a growing threat to tree snail species endemic to Hawaii. Partulina redfieldi population initially decreased by 85% within just 2 years of being discovered by rats.
