= Partulina dubiosa =

- Shell of Partulina dubiosa (specimen at Naturalis Biodiversity Center)

Scientific classification
- Kingdom: Animalia
- Phylum: Mollusca
- Class: Gastropoda
- Order: Stylommatophora
- Family: Achatinellidae
- Genus: Partulina
- Species: P. dubiosa

Binomial name
- Partulina dubiosa (C. B. Adams, 1851)

Synonyms
- Achatinella eburnea Gulick, 1856 junior subjective synonym; Achatinella tappaniana var. dubiosa C. B. Adams, 1851 superseded combination; Partulina (Partulina) dubiosa (C. B. Adams, 1851) alternative representation; Partulina (Partulina) tappaniana eburnea (Gulick, 1856) alternative representation; Partulina tappaniana eburnea (Gulick, 1856) junior subjective synonym

Species of gastropod

Partulina dubiosa is a species of tropical air-breathing land snail, a terrestrial pulmonate gastropod mollusk in the family Achatinellidae.

== Description ==
(Original description) Partulina dubiosa differs from Partulina tappaniana in being slightly more ventricose. Its whorls are not margined above, and the brown stripe is replaced by two fine, paler brown lines, below which one or two other, still finer lines may be discerned.

== Distribution ==
This species is endemic to Hawaii in the United States.
