= Partulina grisea =

- Shell of Partulina grisea (original image)

Scientific classification
- Kingdom: Animalia
- Phylum: Mollusca
- Class: Gastropoda
- Order: Stylommatophora
- Family: Achatinellidae
- Genus: Partulina
- Species: P. grisea

Binomial name
- Partulina grisea (Newcomb, 1854)

Synonyms
- Achatinella grisea Newcomb, 1854 superseded combination; Partulina (Baldwinia) grisea (Newcomb, 1854) alternative representation

Species of gastropod

Partulina grisea is a species of air-breathing land snail, a terrestrial pulmonate gastropod mollusk in the family Achatinellidae.

== Description ==
(Original description in Latin) The shell is sinistral, inflated below, and has an acuminate apex. There are six rounded, non-marginate whorls. The aperture is ovate. The columella is short, flat, and slightly plicate. The outer lip is expanded and thickened internally. The suture is well impressed, and the umbilicus is somewhat open.

The shell is greyish white above, faintly spotted with brown, and grey below. The body whorl is encircled by a narrow, whitish band.

== Distribution ==
This species is endemic to Hawaii and occurs on Maui.
