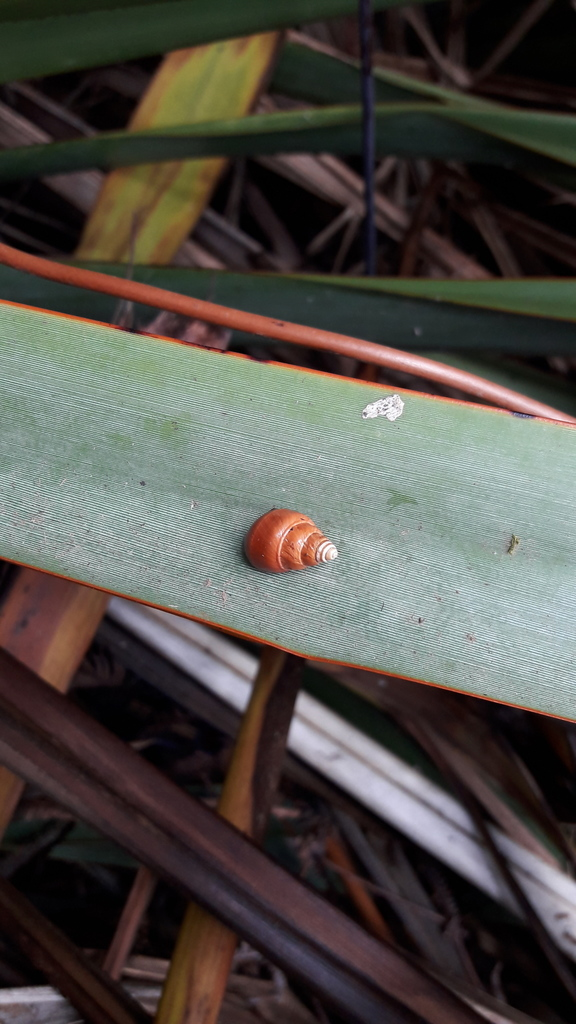
- Live specimen of Partulina semicarinata

Conservation status
- Endangered (IUCN 2.3)

- Critically Imperiled (NatureServe)

Scientific classification
- Kingdom: Animalia
- Phylum: Mollusca
- Class: Gastropoda
- Order: Stylommatophora
- Family: Achatinellidae
- Genus: Partulina
- Species: P. semicarinata

Binomial name
- Partulina semicarinata (Newcomb, 1853)

Synonyms
- Achatinella semicarinata Newcomb, 1854 superseded combination; Partulina (Eburnella) semicarinata (Newcomb, 1854) alternative representation

= Partulina semicarinata =

- Shell of Partulina semicarinata (original image)

Species of gastropod

Partulina semicarinata (Lanai tree snail) is a species of tropical air-breathing land snail, a terrestrial pulmonate gastropod mollusk in the family Achatinellidae. This species is endemic to Hawaii in the United States. The US Fish and Wildlife Service recently proposed to list this snail as an endangered species.

Subspecies

- Partulina semicarinata hayseldeni D. D. Baldwin, 1896
- Partulina semicarinata semicarinata (Newcomb, 1854)

== Description ==
(Original description) The shell is dextral, solid, and ovately conical, with fine longitudinal substriations. It consists of five flattened whorls, which are margined above the body whorl, angulated in the middle, and somewhat semic arinated. The aperture is ovate, and the columella terminates in a tortuous, obtuse, tooth-like plait. The outer lip is produced anteriorly and strongly margined internally. The shell is pale yellow, while the interior of the aperture is white.

This straw-coloured, conical species is distinguished by the elevated keel that partially encircles the last whorl.

== Distribution ==
This species is endemic to Hawaii and occurs on Lanai Island
