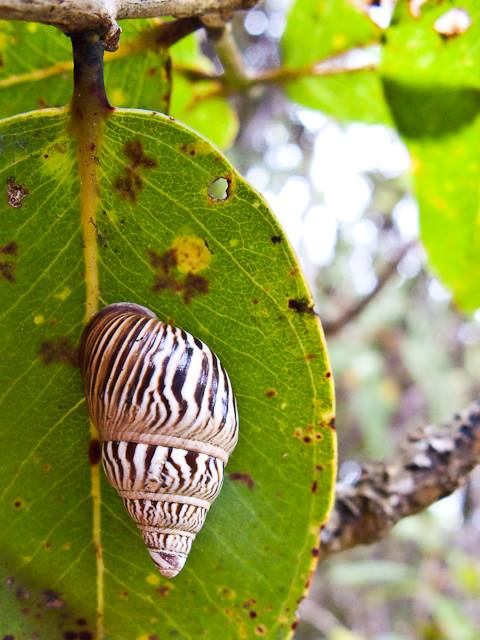

Conservation status
- Endangered (IUCN 2.3)

- Critically Imperiled (NatureServe)

Scientific classification
- Kingdom: Animalia
- Phylum: Mollusca
- Class: Gastropoda
- Order: Stylommatophora
- Family: Achatinellidae
- Genus: Partulina
- Species: P. proxima

Binomial name
- Partulina proxima (Pease, 1862)

= Partulina proxima =

Species of gastropod

Partulina proxima is a species of tropical air-breathing land snail, a terrestrial pulmonate gastropod mollusk in the family Achatinellidae. This species is endemic to Moloka'i, Hawaii in the United States, where it occurs in mid-elevation rainforests where it lives on the leaves of native shrubs and trees.

== Description ==
P. proxima is 1.5–2.0 cm in length and weighs less than 1 gram. Its polymorphic shells are 0.85 mn in length. The species has a smooth shell, which may aid in protection and movement across leaf surfaces. It feeds primarily on epiphyllic fungi and algae that grow on leaves rather than on the plant tissue. P. proxima has a low reproductive rate, producing only a few offspring per year. Its slow reproductive rate produces small populations, leaving the species vunerable to extinction.

== Distribution and habitat ==
P. proxima is found only on the island of Moloka'i, Hawai'i. It inhabits humid, tropical forests with consistent rainfall, typically at mid-elevations. The species is arboreal, living on the branches of trees and shrubs instead of the forest floor. Its range has been significantly reduced by habitat destruction. As forests declined, populations disappeared from many areas that were once common, leaving them in isolated settings.

== Behavior ==
=== Feeding strategy ===
P. proxima feeds on microbial films found on leaf surfaces. The species is nocturnal, feeding and moving during the night to avoid dry and dehydrated spaces. During the day, they hide under leaves and in other small spaces.

=== Movement ===
P. proxima moves slowly. Some specimens have been reported to return to a specific tree if relocated.

== Conservation ==
P. proxima is endangered by climate change, habitat destruction, and invasive species. It is listed by NatureServe as critically imperiled. This species is conserved through the Snail extinction prevention program.
