= Partulina crassa =

- Shell of Partulina crassa (specimen at the Bailey-Matthews National Shell Museum)

Conservation status
- Extinct (IUCN 2.3)

- Possibly Extinct (NatureServe)

Scientific classification
- Kingdom: Animalia
- Phylum: Mollusca
- Class: Gastropoda
- Order: Stylommatophora
- Family: Achatinellidae
- Genus: Partulina
- Species: †P. crassa

Binomial name
- †Partulina crassa (Newcomb, 1854)

Synonyms
- Achatinella crassa Newcomb, 1854; Partulina (Partulina) crassa (Newcomb, 1854)

Species of gastropod

Partulina crassa was a species of air-breathing land snail, a terrestrial pulmonate gastropod mollusk in the family Achatinellidae. This species was endemic to Hawaii in the United States and is now extinct.

== Description ==
(Original description) The shell is dextral, conical, and solid, with a pointed apex. The body whorl is ventricose. The striae are decussating.

There are six rounded whorls, separated by a moderate suture. The aperture is subovate. The columella is short and terminates in a very prominent plait. The lip is white, broadly expanded, and somewhat reflected. The umbilicus is open.

The shell is dark chestnut in colour, sprinkled with white, and bears a white subcentral band on the body whorl.

== Distribution ==
This species is endemic to Hawaii and occurs on Lanai Island.
