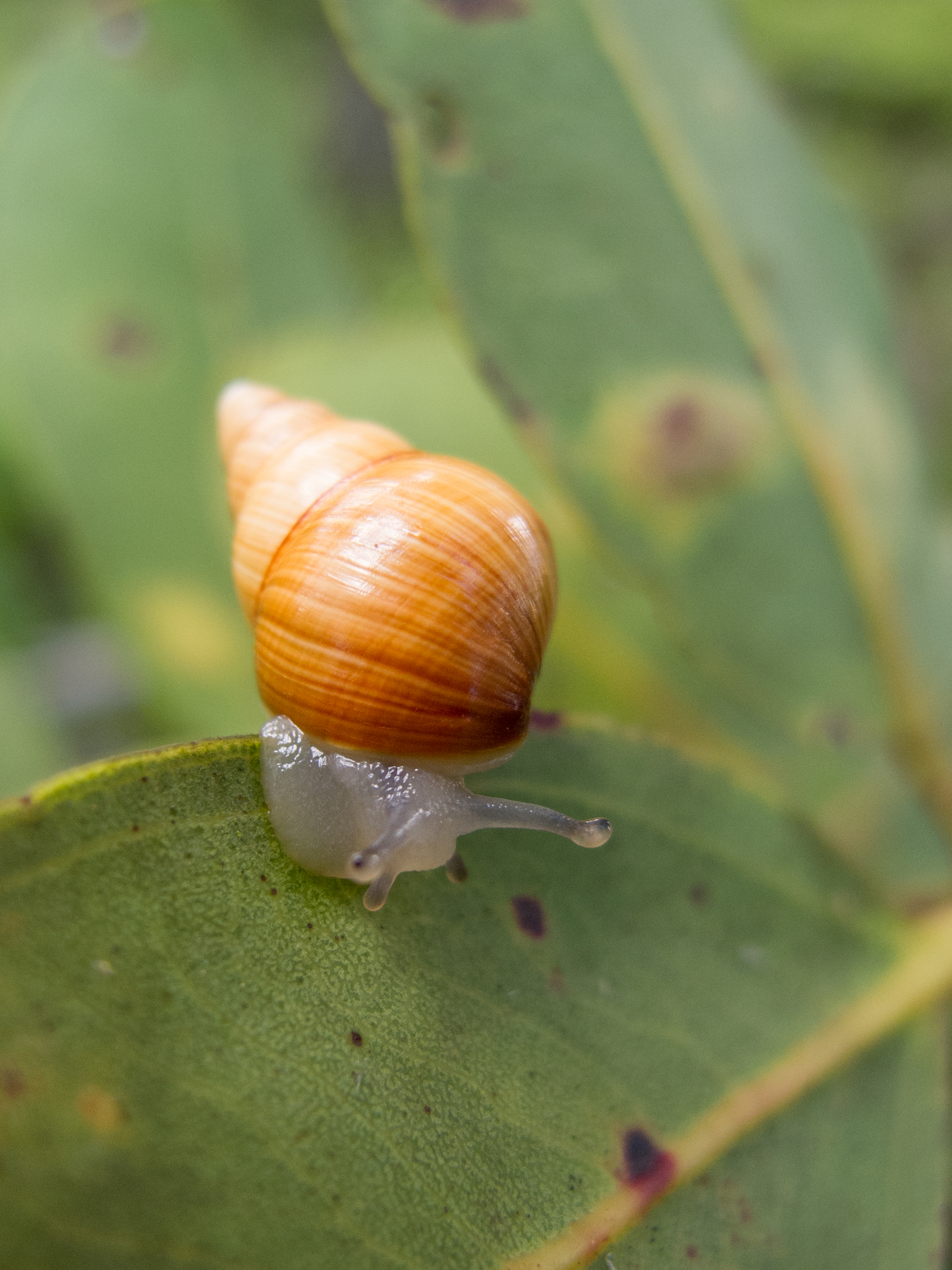
- Live specimen of Partulina variabilis

Conservation status
- Endangered (IUCN 2.3)

- Critically Imperiled (NatureServe)

Scientific classification
- Kingdom: Animalia
- Phylum: Mollusca
- Class: Gastropoda
- Order: Stylommatophora
- Family: Achatinellidae
- Genus: Partulina
- Species: P. variabilis

Binomial name
- Partulina variabilis (Newcomb, 1854)

Synonyms
- Achatinella (Achatinellastrum) saccata L. Pfeiffer, 1859 alternative representation; Achatinella (Eburnella) fulva L. Pfeiffer, 1856 alternative representation; Achatinella (Eburnella) lactea Gulick, 1856 alternative representation; Achatinella fulva L. Pfeiffer, 1856 junior subjective synonym; Achatinella lactea Gulick, 1856 junior subjective synonym; Achatinella saccata L. Pfeiffer, 1859 junior subjective synonym; Achatinella variabilis Newcomb, 1854 superseded combination; Partulina (Eburnella) variabilis (Newcomb, 1854) alternative representation

= Partulina variabilis =

- Shell of Partulina variabilis (original image)

Species of gastropod

Partulina variabilis, also called the lanai tree snail, is a species of tropical air-breathing land snail, a terrestrial pulmonate gastropod mollusk in the family Achatinellidae. This species is endemic to Hawaii.

== Description ==
(Original description) The shell may be sinistral or dextral in its coiling and is conically acuminate, with a polished, lustrous surface. It consists of six rounded whorls, which are lightly margined along their upper edges, and has a broadly ovate aperture. The columella is short and bears a prominent tubercle of a roseate hue, while the lip is expanded and acute. The shell exhibits a remarkable range of colours, including white, yellow, black, and various other shades. It may be uniformly coloured or ornamented with one to six bands of different colours across the body whorl.

This is the most variable species in its markings yet recorded among the Achatinellae. Indeed, it is exceedingly difficult to find two specimens that are exactly alike, except the plain ones, in this respect.

They reach maturity at 4 to 7 years.

== Distribution and habitat ==
Partulina variabilis is found on the island of Lanai at Lanaihale. They can be found in wet montane forests at elevations from 3,300 feet to 3,600 feet on Mount Lanaihale.
