= Partulina dwightii =

- Shell of Partulina dwightii compta (specimen at MNHN, Paris)

Conservation status
- Data Deficient (IUCN 2.3)

- Critically Imperiled (NatureServe)

Scientific classification
- Kingdom: Animalia
- Phylum: Mollusca
- Class: Gastropoda
- Order: Stylommatophora
- Family: Achatinellidae
- Genus: Partulina
- Species: P. dwightii

Binomial name
- Partulina dwightii (Newcomb, 1855)

Synonyms
- Achatinella dwighti L. Pfeiffer, 1856 junior homonym; Achatinella dwightii Newcomb, 1855 superseded combination; Partulina (Partulina) dwightii (Newcomb, 1855) alternative representation; Partulina (Partulina) dwightii var. concomitans Hyatt, 1912 alternative representation; Partulina dwightii var. concomitans Hyatt, 1912 junior subjective synonym

Species of gastropod

Partulina dwightii is a species of tropical air-breathing land snail, a terrestrial pulmonate gastropod mollusk in the family Achatinellidae.

Subspecies

- Partulina dwightii compta Pease, 1869
- Partulina dwightii dwighti (Newcomb, 1855)
- Partulina dwightii macrodon Borcherding, 1901
- Partulina dwightii mucida (D. D. Baldwin, 1895)
- Partulina dwightii occidentalis Pilsbry & C. M. Cooke, 1914

== Description ==
(Original description) This sinistral shell is oblong-conical and solid. Its surface is covered with oblique longitudinal striae, which are cut across by very numerous fine, slightly undulating transverse striae. The six whorls are flatly convex and crenulated at the sutures; the suture is simple and well marked. The aperture is ovate; the columella is broad, short, and slightly twisted, while the outer lip is expanded and sub-reflected below. The shell is sub-umbilicated. Its colour is greyish white, marked with numerous blotches and zigzag markings of brown, which become more obscure on the body whorl; the aperture and lip are of a dingy white.

== Distribution ==
This species is endemic to Hawaii and occurs on Molokai.
