= Partulina montagui =

Conservation status
- Extinct (IUCN 2.3)

Scientific classification
- Kingdom: Animalia
- Phylum: Mollusca
- Class: Gastropoda
- Order: Stylommatophora
- Family: Achatinellidae
- Genus: Partulina
- Species: †P. montagui

Binomial name
- †Partulina montagui Pilsbry, 1850

Synonyms
- Partulina (Partulina) montagui Pilsbry, 1913 alternative representation

Species of gastropod

†Partulina montagui was a species of tropical air-breathing land snail, a terrestrial pulmonate gastropod mollusk in the family Achatinellidae.

== Description ==
The shell measures 25 mm in length and 14 mm in diameter.

(Original description) The shell is sinistral, perforate, and ovate-conic, with an acuminate spire. It is thick and solid, and is sculptured with close, irregular wrinkles; the body whorl is malleated. The shell has seven whorls: the upper whorls are nearly flat, while the remaining whorls are convex. The suture is superficial.

The outer and basal margins of the peristome are expanded and thick, becoming heavily thickened within. The columellar margin is thick, and the columellar fold is thick and moderately prominent.

== Distribution ==
This species was endemic to Hawaii and found on Oahu Island
