= Partulina hobdyi =

Scientific classification
- Kingdom: Animalia
- Phylum: Mollusca
- Class: Gastropoda
- Order: Stylommatophora
- Family: Achatinellidae
- Genus: Partulina
- Species: P. hobdyi

Binomial name
- Partulina hobdyi Severns, 2011

Synonyms
- Partulina (Partulina) hobdyi Severns, 2011 alternative representation

Species of gastropod

Partulina hobdyi is a species of tropical air-breathing land snail, a terrestrial pulmonate gastropod mollusk in the family Achatinellidae.

== Distribution ==
This species is endemic to Maui, Hawaii.
