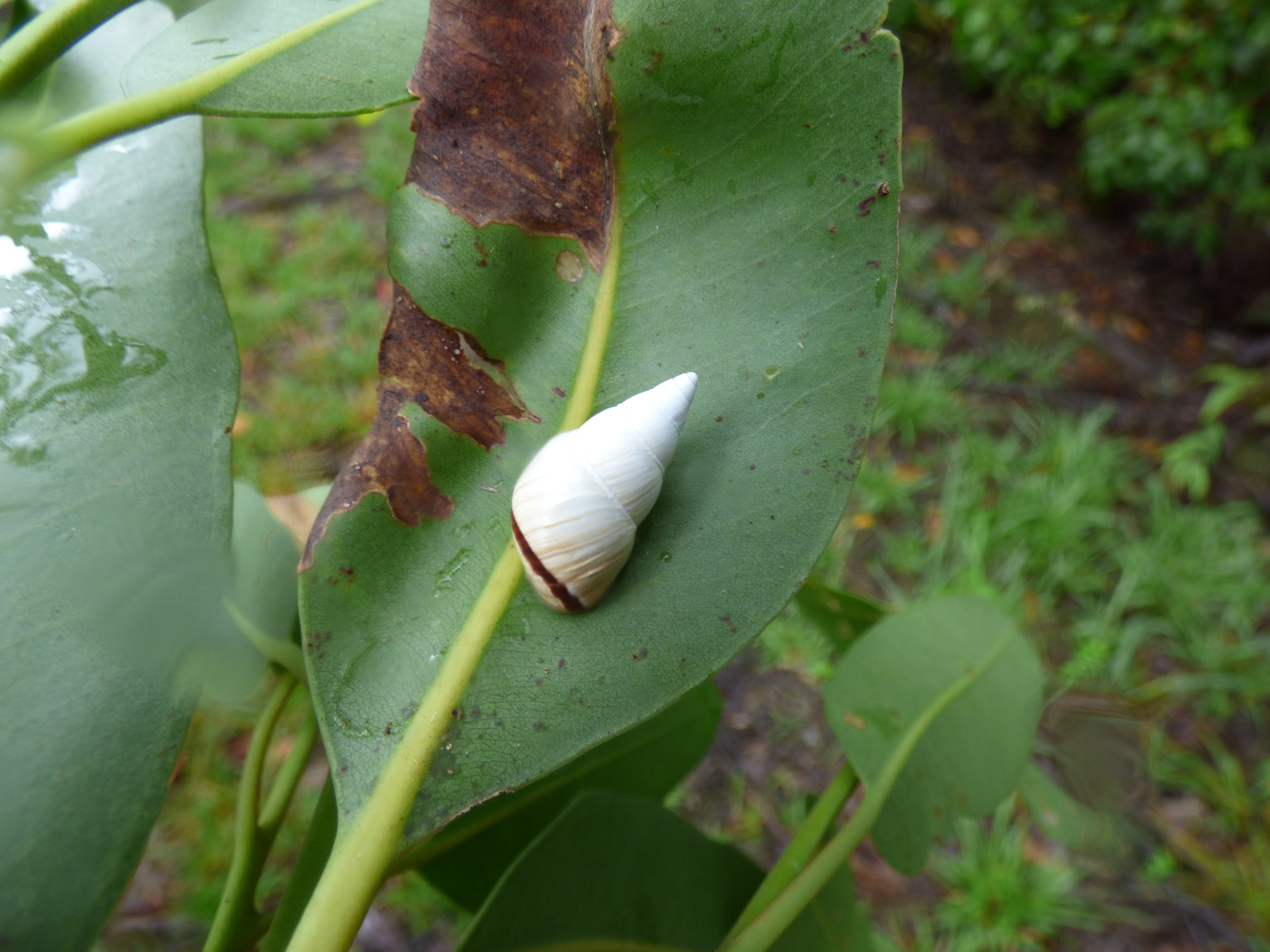

Conservation status
- Data Deficient (IUCN 2.3)

- Critically Imperiled (NatureServe)

Scientific classification
- Kingdom: Animalia
- Phylum: Mollusca
- Class: Gastropoda
- Order: Stylommatophora
- Family: Achatinellidae
- Genus: Partulina
- Species: P. dolei

Binomial name
- Partulina dolei (Baldwin, 1895)

Synonyms
- Achatinella (Partulina) dolei D. D. Baldwin, 1895 superseded combination; Partulina (Partulina) dolei (D. D. Baldwin, 1895) · alternative representation; Partulina (Partulina) lemmoni D. D. Baldwin, 1906 alternative representation; Partulina lemmoni D. D. Baldwin, 1906 junior subjective synonym

= Partulina dolei =

Species of gastropod

Partulina dolei is a species of tropical air-breathing land snail, a terrestrial pulmonate gastropod mollusk in the family Achatinellidae.

== Description ==
The length of the shell attains 24.5 mm, its diameter 14 mm.

(Original description) The shell is sinistral, minutely perforate, and somewhat solid, with an acuminately ovate-conical form and an acute apex. Its surface is shining and marked by delicate incremental striae; under a lens, it exhibits extremely close, minute, decussating spiral striae. The whorls of the protoconch are faintly cross-lined.

The shell is white and is encircled below the periphery by a brownish-black band. At and above the periphery, it bears more or less numerous, delicate chestnut-coloured spiral lines, which become fainter on the middle whorls and obsolete above.

There are 6½ convex whorls, narrowly margined above and separated by a deeply impressed suture. The body whorl is somewhat inflated, roundly angulate at the periphery, and flattened at the base.

The aperture is oblique and roundly ovate, with a flattened basal margin. It is white internally and exhibits the brown markings of the exterior. The peristome is acute, angulate at the periphery, and slightly thickened internally; it is expanded, with narrowly reflexed basal and columellar margins. The columella terminates in a long, flexuous, white plait.

When extended during locomotion, the animal is longer than its shell. The mantle is intensely black, with a broad yellow outer margin and a conspicuous orange spot at the centre of the margin. The foot tapers posteriorly and is light yellow on both its upper and lower surfaces. The tentacles are long, slender, and light slate in colour. The upper surface of the head is lightly granulated.

== Distribution ==
This species is endemic to Maui, Hawaii, in the United States. It is found in mixed mesic forests in East Maui.
