= Partulina lignaria =

- Shell of Partulina lignaria (original image)

Scientific classification
- Kingdom: Animalia
- Phylum: Mollusca
- Class: Gastropoda
- Order: Stylommatophora
- Family: Achatinellidae
- Genus: Partulina
- Species: P. lignaria

Binomial name
- Partulina lignaria (Gulick, 1856)

Synonyms
- Achatinella lignaria Gulick, 1856 superseded combination; Partulina (Partulina) lignaria (Gulick, 1856) alternative representation; Partulina (Partulina) terebra lignaria (Gulick, 1856) alternative representation; Partulina terebra lignaria Gulick, 1856 superseded rank

Species of gastropod

Partulina lignaria is a species of land snail in the family Achatinellidae.

Subspecies

- Partulina lignaria crocea (Gulick, 1856)
- Partulina lignaria lignaria (Gulick, 1856)

== Description ==
The shell measures 0.80 inches (20.3 mm) in length and 0.41 inches (10.4 mm) in diameter, with the aperture itself reaching a length of 0.35 inches (9 mm).

(Original description) The solid shell is dextral, perforate, ovate-conic. It shows a more or less shining surface. Under microscopic examination, it appears minutely decussated. Its color is yellowish ivory-white and is sometimes streaked. The apex is subacute and white, marked obliquely with brownish yellow. The spire is regularly conical.

The suture is moderately impressed and scarcely margined. The shell has six and a half somewhat convex whorls; the body whorl equals about 66/100 of the shell's total length. The columellar fold is strong and white.

The aperture is somewhat oblique and sinuously oval. The peristome is thickened and is sometimes slightly expanded and reflected anteriorly. The columellar margin is dilated, white, and unattached, while the parietal margin is absent.

== Distribution ==
This species is endemic to Maui Island, Hawaii in the United States.
