= Partulina puupiliensis =

Scientific classification
- Kingdom: Animalia
- Phylum: Mollusca
- Class: Gastropoda
- Order: Stylommatophora
- Family: Achatinellidae
- Genus: Partulina
- Species: P. puupiliensis

Binomial name
- Partulina puupiliensis Severns, 2011

Synonyms
- Partulina (Baldwinia) puupiliensis Severns, 2011 alternative representation

Species of gastropod

Partulina puupiliensis is a species of tropical air-breathing land snail, a terrestrial pulmonate gastropod mollusk in the family Achatinellidae.

== Distribution ==
This species is endemic to Kohala (mountain), Hawaii.
