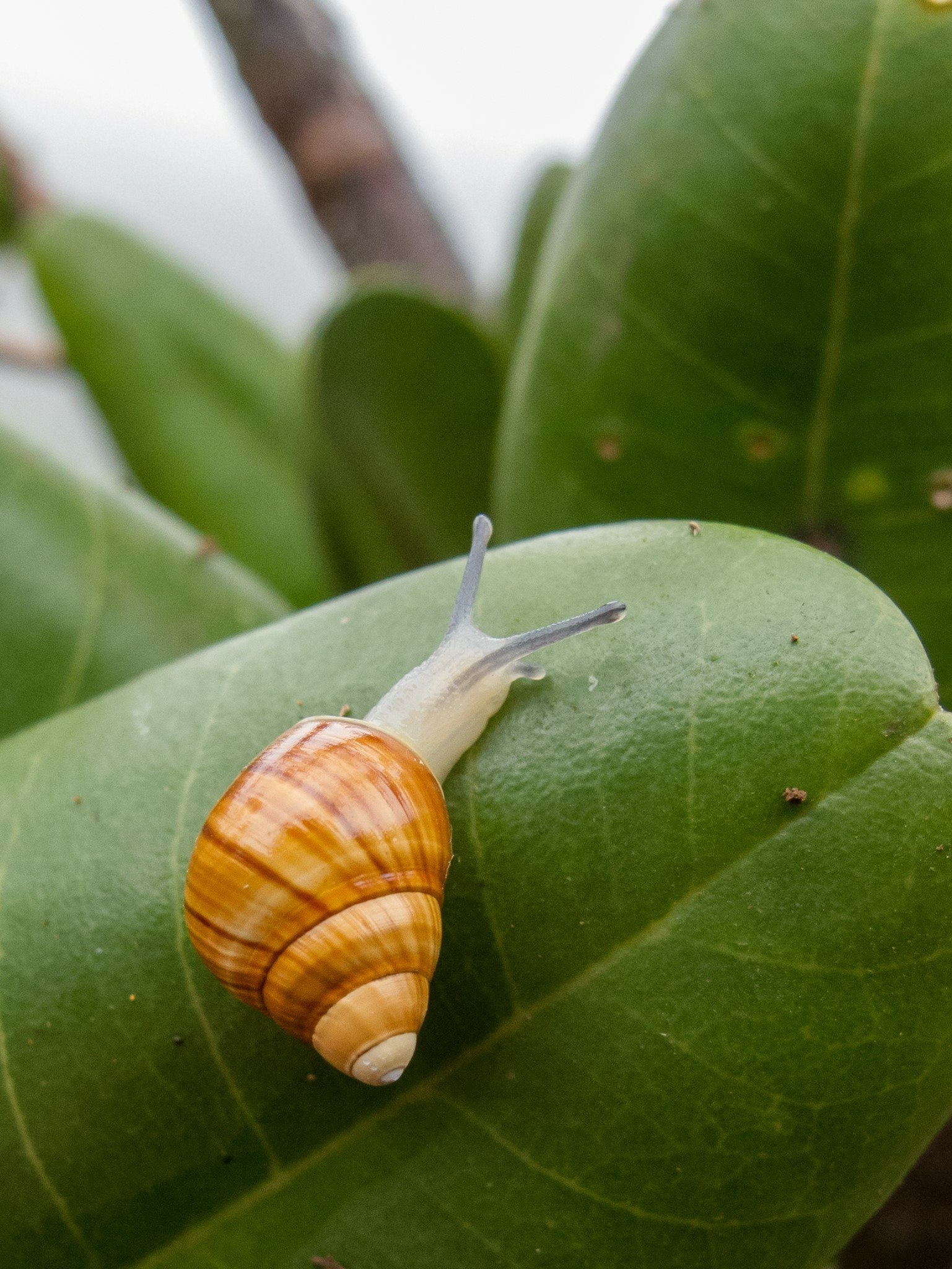

Conservation status
- Critically Endangered (IUCN 2.3)

- Possibly Extinct (NatureServe)
- CITES Appendix I

Scientific classification
- Kingdom: Animalia
- Phylum: Mollusca
- Class: Gastropoda
- Order: Stylommatophora
- Family: Achatinellidae
- Genus: Achatinella
- Subgenus: Bulimella
- Species: A. pupukanioe

Binomial name
- Achatinella pupukanioe Pilsbry & Cooke, 1914

= Achatinella pupukanioe =

Pupu kani oe

Species of gastropod

Achatinella pupukanioe is an extremely rare and possibly extinct species of land snail, a gastropod in the family Achatinellidae. It is endemic to Hawaii.

== Shell description ==
The dextral shell is conic and solid. The shell has six whorls. The glossy color is a uniform white, or ivory yellow with a white sutural line or either of these tints with a burnt sienna band immediately above a wider and darker band. The suture is margined. The lip is not expanded and has a brownish edge; the internal rib is white, or sometimes the whole lip is pale-pink. The white columellar fold is rather strong and abrupt.

The height of the shell is 16.3 mm. The width of the shell is 9.7 mm.

== Conservation status ==
In 2015, the SEPP team found a tree full of Achatinella pupukanioe. The SEPP decided to leave them alone, but a few years later when they went to collect the snails for the lab they were gone, possibly swallowed whole by rosy wolfsnails.

While the species is now believed to be extinct, there is a slim chance surviving undetected populations may still exist somewhere in the Koolau Mountains.
