= Partulina marmorata =

- Shell of Partulina marmorata (specimen at the Smithsonian Institution)

Scientific classification
- Kingdom: Animalia
- Phylum: Mollusca
- Class: Gastropoda
- Order: Stylommatophora
- Family: Achatinellidae
- Genus: Partulina
- Species: P. marmorata

Binomial name
- Partulina marmorata (A. A. Gould, 1847)

Synonyms
- Achatinella adamsi Newcomb, 1853 junior subjective synonym; Achatinella marmorata A. A. Gould, 1847 superseded combination; Partulina (Partulina) marmorata (A. A. Gould, 1847) alternative representation

Species of gastropod

Partulina marmorata is a species of air-breathing land snail, a terrestrial pulmonate gastropod mollusk in the family Achatinellidae.

== Description ==
The length of the shell attains 0.9 inch (22.9 mm), its diameter 0.5 inch (12.7 mm)

(Original description in Latin) The shell is oblong-ovate and marbled with chestnut, gray, and whitish colors. It is lightly striated and imperforate. The spire is acute, and the shell has six convex whorls that are somewhat flattened above. The body whorl is large and ventricose.

The aperture is ovate. The peristome is simple and moderately expanded. The columellar plica is white, compressed, nearly transverse, and strongly projecting.

== Distribution ==
This species is endemic to Hawaii and occurs on Maui.
