= Tubuaia fosbergi =

Conservation status
- Vulnerable (IUCN 2.3)

Scientific classification
- Kingdom: Animalia
- Phylum: Mollusca
- Class: Gastropoda
- Order: Stylommatophora
- Family: Achatinellidae
- Genus: Tubuaia
- Species: T. fosbergi

Binomial name
- Tubuaia fosbergi Kondo, 1962

Species of gastropod

Tubuaia fosbergi is a species of air-breathing land snail or semislug, a terrestrial pulmonate gastropod mollusk in the family Helicarionidae. This species is endemic to the Pitcairn Islands.
