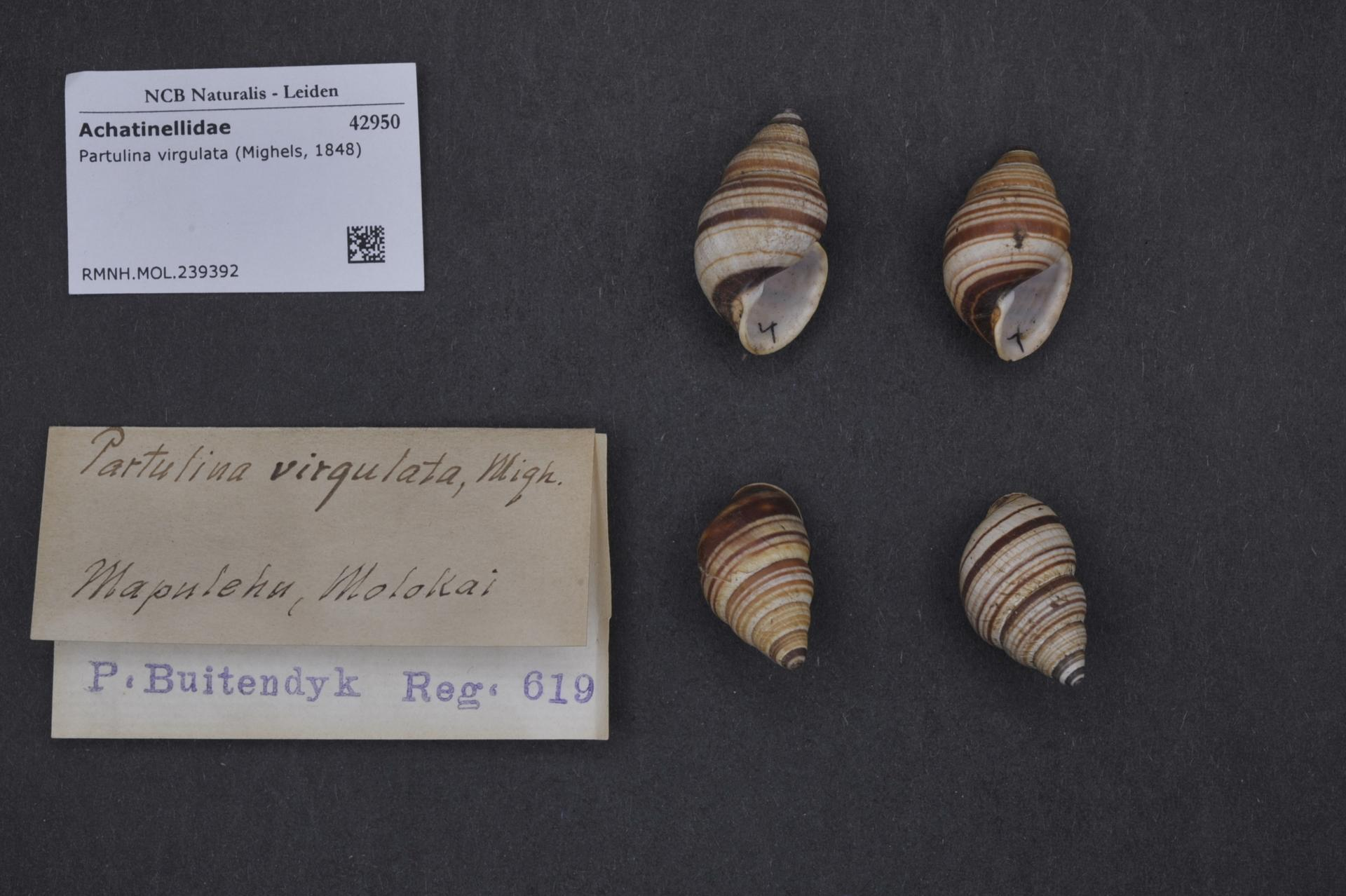

Conservation status
- Data Deficient (IUCN 2.3)

- Critically Imperiled (NatureServe)

Scientific classification
- Kingdom: Animalia
- Phylum: Mollusca
- Class: Gastropoda
- Order: Stylommatophora
- Family: Achatinellidae
- Genus: Partulina
- Species: P. virgulata

Binomial name
- Partulina virgulata (Mighels, 1845)

= Partulina virgulata =

Species of gastropod

Partulina virgulata is a species of tropical air-breathing land snail, a terrestrial pulmonate gastropod mollusk in the family Achatinellidae. This species is endemic to Hawaii in the United States.

== Description ==
The shell of Partulina virgulata is of a light tan color with dark brown bands and a lighter whorl that goes from plum-colored to a white shade. Malacologist Dilev D. Thaanum has recorded 1,067 organisms of this species. He has found that 1,053 of those mollusks have a sinistral shell, which indicates that the majority of the species are configured with the opening of the shell to the left which is rare for most gastropod species. The species is also less likely to reproduce often.

== Distribution and habitat ==
Partulina virgulata is endemic to the island of Moloka’i, from the northern side near Pelekunu or valleys near Kamalo to the eastern side of the island. It is mostly found on native plants and shrubs.
