= Partulina nattii =

- Shell of Partulina natti (fossil specimen at the Jackson School Museum of Earth History, University of Texas at Austin)

Conservation status
- Data Deficient (IUCN 2.3)

- Critically Imperiled (NatureServe)

Scientific classification
- Kingdom: Animalia
- Phylum: Mollusca
- Class: Gastropoda
- Order: Stylommatophora
- Family: Achatinellidae
- Genus: Partulina
- Species: P. nattii

Binomial name
- Partulina nattii (Hartman, 1888)

Synonyms
- Achatinella (Achatinellastrum) nattii Hartman, 1888 superseded combination; Achatinella nattii (Hartman, 1888) superseded combination; Achatinellastrum nealii Hartman, 1888 misspelling - incorrect subsequent spelling; Partulina (Eburnella) nattii (Hartman, 1888) alternative representation

Species of gastropod

Partulina nattii is a species of tropical air-breathing land snail, a terrestrial pulmonate gastropod mollusk in the family Achatinellidae.

== Description ==
The length of the shell attains 16 mm, its diameter 10 mm.

(Original description) The shell is dextral and turbinate, with a spire that extends for half its total length. It contains five polished whorls, the last two of which enlarge rapidly and become inflated. The suture is impressed, and the columella is yellow, stout, and twisted. The shell is bright deep yellow, with one white band and three broad chestnut bands beneath the suture; the chestnut bands are also visible from within the aperture. The aperture is rounded-ovate and white, while the outer lip is white and slightly thickened internally.

== Distribution ==
This species is endemic to Hawaii and found on Maui.
