= Partulina thaanumiana =

- Shell of Partulina thaanumiana (original image)

Scientific classification
- Kingdom: Animalia
- Phylum: Mollusca
- Class: Gastropoda
- Order: Stylommatophora
- Family: Achatinellidae
- Genus: Partulina
- Species: †P. thaanumiana

Binomial name
- †Partulina thaanumiana Pilsbry, 1850

Synonyms
- Partulina (Baldwinia) thaanumiana Pilsbry, 1913 alternative representation

Species of gastropod

Partulina thaanumiana is a species of tropical air-breathing land snail, a terrestrial pulmonate gastropod mollusk in the family Achatinellidae.

== Description ==
The shell measures 25 mm in length and 14 mm in diameter.

(Original description) The shell is sinistral, narrowly umbilicate, thin, and ovate-conic, with a slightly shining surface. The later whorls are densely striated spirally, with waved, descending striae. The embryonic whorls are very densely and distinctly engraved.

The embryonic shell consists of three and a half whorls. The first two whorls are brown beneath a whitish layer, while the third whorl is marked with oblique, angulated white stripes on a reddish-brown ground. The following, neanic whorls are mottled and streaked with white on a reddish-brown ground. This ground color becomes paler on the body whorl, which is indistinctly streaked and mottled with creamy or brownish white and girdled by a narrow dark band at the periphery.

The whorls are strongly convex. The aperture is slightly oblique and purplish-brown, with light streaks within. The peristome expands slightly at the base and is narrowly bordered with white within, but it is not thickened. The columella is slightly convex and not plicate; its margin spreads into a triangle and is white.

== Distribution ==
This species is endemic to Hawaii and found on Maui Island
