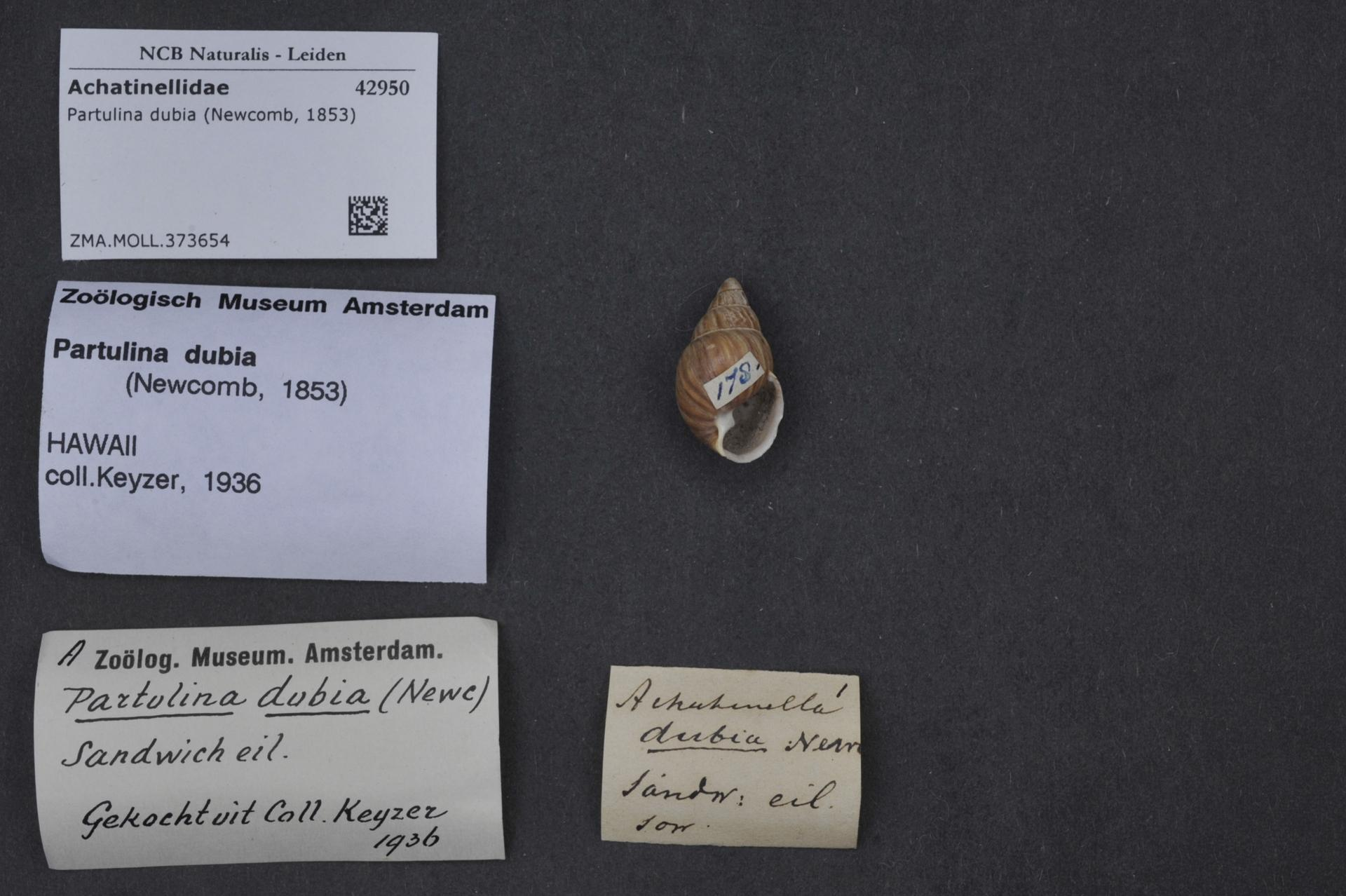
- Shell of Partulina dubia (specimen at Naturalis Biodiversity Center)

Conservation status
- Critically Endangered (IUCN 2.3)

- Critically Imperiled (NatureServe)

Scientific classification
- Kingdom: Animalia
- Phylum: Mollusca
- Class: Gastropoda
- Order: Stylommatophora
- Family: Achatinellidae
- Genus: Partulina
- Species: P. dubia

Binomial name
- Partulina dubia (Newcombe, 1853)

Synonyms
- Achatinella (Baldwinia) platystyla Gulick, 1856 alternative representation; Achatinella (Bulimella) morbida L. Pfeiffer, 1859 alternative representation; Achatinella dubia Newcomb, 1853 superseded combination; Achatinella fucosa A. B. Lyons, 1891 junior subjective synonym; Achatinella morbida L. Pfeiffer, 1859 junior subjective synonym; Achatinella pexa Gulick, 1856 junior subjective synonym; Achatinella platystyla Gulick, 1856 junior subjective synonym; Partulina (Baldwinia) dubia (Newcomb, 1853) alternative representation; Partulina (Baldwinia) pexa (Gulick, 1856) junior subjective synonym

= Partulina dubia =

Species of gastropod

Partulina dubia is a species of tropical air-breathing land snail, a terrestrial pulmonate gastropod mollusk in the family Achatinellidae.

Subspecies

- Partulina dubia perantiqua C. M. Cooke & Y. Kondo, 1952

== Description ==
(Original description) The shell is dextral, conically elongate, and thin, with fine decussate striations. It is light corneous in color and marked with radiating zigzag lines and pale blotches. The shell consists of six whorls, separated by a simple suture. The aperture is ovate. The columella is white and bulimoid in form, except in fully developed adults, in which it becomes callous and bears an obtuse dentition. The umbilicus is small but remains open, while the lip is thickened and slightly reflected.

The shell measures 20.32 mm in length and 13.97 mm in diameter.

== Distribution ==
This species is endemic to Hawaii on Oahu Island.
