= Partulina radiata =

- Shell of Partulina radiata (specimen at the Smithsonian Institution)

Scientific classification
- Kingdom: Animalia
- Phylum: Mollusca
- Class: Gastropoda
- Order: Stylommatophora
- Family: Achatinellidae
- Genus: Partulina
- Species: P. radiata

Binomial name
- Partulina radiata (A. A. Gould, 1845)

Synonyms
- Achatinella (Bulimella) radiata A. A. Gould, 1845 superseded combination; Achatinella radiata A. A. Gould, 1845 superseded combination; Bulimus gouldi L. Pfeiffer, 1848 junior subjective synonym; Partula denselineata Reeve, 1850 superseded combination; Partulina (Partulina) denselineata (Reeve, 1850) alternative representation; Partulina (Partulina) radiata (A. A. Gould, 1845) alternative representation; Partulina denselineata (Reeve, 1850) junior subjective synonym

Species of gastropod

Partulina radiata is a species of air-breathing land snail, a terrestrial pulmonate gastropod mollusk in the family Achatinellidae.

== Description ==
(Original description in Latin) The solid shell is ovate-conical, and umbilicate. It showsh fine longitudinal lines of chestnut, yellowish, and whitish coloration. A white band is sometimes present at the middle or base of the shell. There are six convex whorls, separated by a margined, whitish suture. The aperture is ovate, with a reflected, yellowish peristome and a broad columellar fold.

== Distribution ==
This species is endemic to Hawaii.
