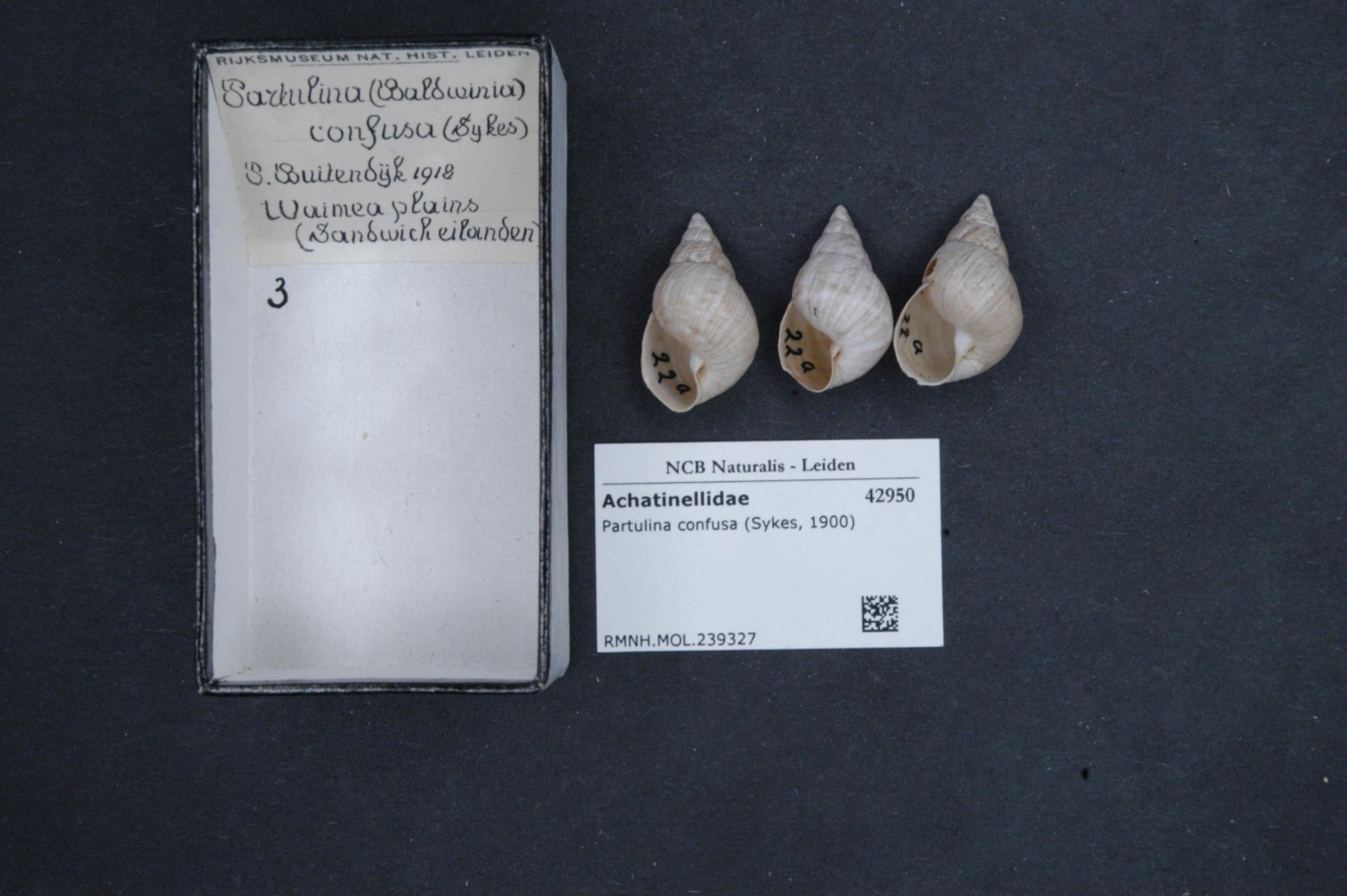

Conservation status
- Critically Endangered (IUCN 2.3)

Scientific classification
- Kingdom: Animalia
- Phylum: Mollusca
- Class: Gastropoda
- Order: Stylommatophora
- Family: Achatinellidae
- Genus: Partulina
- Species: P. confusa

Binomial name
- Partulina confusa (Sykes, 1900)

Synonyms
- Achatinella (Partulina) confusa Sykes, 1900 superseded combination; Partulina (Baldwinia) confusa (Sykes, 1900) alternative representation; Partulina (Baldwinia) physa var. phaeostoma Ancey, 1904 alternative representation; Partulina physa var. phaeostoma Ancey, 1904 junior subjective synonym

= Partulina confusa =

Species of gastropod

Partulina confusa is a species of tropical air-breathing land snail, a terrestrial pulmonate gastropod mollusk in the family Achatinellidae.

== Distribution ==
This species is endemic to Hawaii, in the United States.
