= Partulina fasciata =

- Shell of Partulina fasciata (original image)

Scientific classification
- Kingdom: Animalia
- Phylum: Mollusca
- Class: Gastropoda
- Order: Stylommatophora
- Family: Achatinellidae
- Genus: Partulina
- Species: P. fasciata

Binomial name
- Partulina fasciata (Gulick, 1856)

Synonyms
- Achatinella fasciata Gulick, 1856 superseded combination; Partulina (Partulina) fasciata (Gulick, 1856) alternative representation; Partulina (Partulina) tappaniana fasciata (Gulick, 1856) alternative representation; Partulina tappaniana fasciata (Gulick, 1856) unaccepted > superseded rank

Species of gastropod

Partulina fasciata is a species of land snail in the family Achatinellidae.

Subspecies

- Partulina fasciata fasciata (Gulick, 1856)
- Partulina fasciata hauptmani Severns, 2011

== Description ==
The shell measures 0.87 inches (22 mm) in length and 0.45 inches (11.5 mm) in diameter, with the aperture itself reaching a length of 0.39 inches (10 mm).

(Original description) The solid shell is sinistral, sometimes perforate, ovate-conic and shining. It is finely striated and, under microscopic examination, very minutely and faintly decussated. The shell is white and bears brown bands. The apex is subacute and white, with a brown line above the suture. The spire is regularly conical.

The shell has six or seven convex, unmargined whorls. The last whorl is rounded and equals about five-sixths of the shell’s length. The columellar fold is white, superior, slightly developed, and moderately twisted.

The aperture is somewhat oblique and roundly oval, and is white within. The brown bands sometimes appear as pale brownish stripes on the inner surface. The peristome is white and slightly thickened, becoming subreflected anteriorly. The columellar margin is reflected and scarcely adnate, while the parietal margin is absent.

== Distribution ==
This species is endemic to Maui Island, Hawaii in the United States.
