= Partulina subpolita =

- Shell of Partulina subpolita (original image)

Scientific classification
- Kingdom: Animalia
- Phylum: Mollusca
- Class: Gastropoda
- Order: Stylommatophora
- Family: Achatinellidae
- Genus: Partulina
- Species: P. subpolita

Binomial name
- Partulina subpolita Pilsbry & C. M. Cooke, 1912

Synonyms
- Partulina (Partulina) subpolita Pilsbry & C. M. Cooke, 1912 alternative representation (basionym)

Species of gastropod

Partulina subpolita is a species of tropical air-breathing land snail, a terrestrial pulmonate gastropod mollusk in the family Achatinellidae.

== Description ==
The length of the shell attains 17 mm, its diameter 11 mm.

(Original description) The sinistral shell is imperforate, ovate-conic, and rather solid. The embryonic whorls are white, with a broad chocolate band above the suture, and bear exceedingly faint spiral striae or none at all. The subsequent whorls are light chrome ("pinard yellow"), either uniform in color or marked with one or several faint whitish lines at or below the middle.

The surface is glossy, with distinct growth wrinkles but only faint traces of spiral striae. The body whorl is somewhat compressed at the periphery. The aperture is white, and the outer lip is expanded below and slightly thickened internally. The columella is white and bears a moderately developed fold

== Distribution ==
This species is endemic to Hawaii and occurs on Molokai.
