= Partulina horneri =

- Shell of Partulina horneri (specimen at the BMSM Bailey-Matthews National Shell Museum)

Scientific classification
- Kingdom: Animalia
- Phylum: Mollusca
- Class: Gastropoda
- Order: Stylommatophora
- Family: Achatinellidae
- Genus: Partulina
- Species: P. horneri

Binomial name
- Partulina horneri (Baldwin, 1895)

Synonyms
- Achatinella (Partulina) horneri D. D. Baldwin, 1895 superseded combination; Partulina (Baldwinia) horneri D. D. Baldwin, 1895 ·alternative representation; Partulina (Baldwinia) horneri var. candida Pilsbry & C. M. Cooke, 1914 junior subjective synonym; Partulina (Baldwinia) horneri var. fuscospira Pilsbry & C. M. Cooke, 1914 junior subjective synonym; Partulina (Baldwinia) horneri var. fuscozonata Pilsbry & C. M. Cooke, 1914 junior subjective synonym

Species of gastropod

Partulina horneri is a species of tropical air-breathing land snail, a terrestrial pulmonate gastropod mollusk in the family Achatinellidae.

Subspecies

- Partulina horneri kapuana J. J. Gouveia & A. Gouveia, 1920

Variety

- Partulina horneri var. kapuana J. J. Gouveia & A. Gouveia, 1920: synonym of Partulina horneri kapuana J. J. Gouveia & A. Gouveia, 1920 (superseded rank)

== Description ==
The length of the shell attains 24 mm, its diameter 18 mm.

(Original description) The shell is sinistral, minutely perforate, and thin, with a globose form and a short, acutely conical spire; the apex is acute. Its surface is shining and striated by fine incremental lines; under a lens, it exhibits very close, delicate, decussating spiral striae. The whorls of the protoconch are faintly cross-lined.

The shell is dull white and is encircled at the periphery by a faint brown zone, which continues onto the suture. A very small patch of the same colour also surrounds the umbilicus.

There are six whorls. The upper five are slightly convex, whereas the body whorl is very greatly inflated and forms the greater part of the shell. The suture is distinctly impressed.

The aperture is oblique, subrotund, and very large. It is white internally and distinctly shows the external peripheral band. The peristome is margined with light brown, is rather thin, and is very slightly thickened internally; it is expanded, with narrowly reflexed basal and columellar margins. Its extremities converge slightly and are united by a thin callus. The columella is light brown, very slightly developed, plain, and smooth.

When in motion, the animal is longer than its shell. The mantle is black and margined with grey. The foot is grey on both its upper and lower surfaces, and its superior portions are lightly granulated. The tentacles are light grey.

There is also a pure white form of the shell that lacks the peripheral band, as well as a form that is white with a light chestnut-coloured band on the apical whorls. The animals of these varieties differ only slightly from those of the typical form.

== Distribution ==
This species is endemic to Hawaii, in the United States.
