= Partulina ustulata =

- Shell of Partulina ustulata

Conservation status
- Data Deficient (IUCN 2.3)

- Critically Imperiled (NatureServe)

Scientific classification
- Kingdom: Animalia
- Phylum: Mollusca
- Class: Gastropoda
- Order: Stylommatophora
- Family: Achatinellidae
- Genus: Partulina
- Species: P. ustulata

Binomial name
- Partulina ustulata (Gulick, 1856)

Synonyms
- Achatinella ustulata Gulick, 1856 superseded combination; Partulina (Partulina) ustulata (Gulick, 1856) alternative representation

Species of gastropod

Partulina ustulata is a species of tropical air-breathing land snail, a terrestrial pulmonate gastropod mollusk in the family Achatinellidae.

== Description ==
The shell measures 1 inches (25.4 mm) in length and 0.57 inches (14.5 mm) in diameter, with the aperture itself reaching a length of 0.52 inches (13.5 mm).

(Original description) The sinistral shell is perforate, ovate-conic, and obliquely produced at the base. It is solid, scarcely shining, striated, and, under microscopic examination, distinctly decussated. Its color is brown, with a whitish band encircling the base. The apex is subacute and tessellated with white and brown. The spire is conical and somewhat curvilinear.

The suture is simple, lightly impressed, and marked by a narrow white line. The shell contains six and a half moderately convex whorls; the body whorl is large and equals about seven-tenths of the shell’s total length. The columellar fold is strong, white, and oblique.

The aperture is very oblique and sinuously oval. The peristome is thickened within and reflected anteriorly. The columellar margin is dilated, white, and unattached, while the parietal margin is absent.

== Distribution ==
This species is endemic to Hawaii in the United States.
