= Partulina theodorei =

- Shell of Partulina theodorei (original image)

Scientific classification
- Kingdom: Animalia
- Phylum: Mollusca
- Class: Gastropoda
- Order: Stylommatophora
- Family: Achatinellidae
- Genus: Partulina
- Species: P. theodorei

Binomial name
- Partulina theodorei (Baldwin, 1895)

Synonyms
- Achatinella theodorei superseded combination; Partulina (Partulina) theodorei (D. D. Baldwin, 1895) · alternative representation

Species of gastropod

Partulina theodorei is a species of tropical air-breathing land snail, a terrestrial pulmonate gastropod mollusk in the family Achatinellidae.

== Description ==
The length of the shell attains 18.5 mm, its diameter 9 mm.

(Original description) The shell is sinistral, subperforate, and rather thin, with an elongately conical form and a subacute apex. Its surface is shining and sculptured with somewhat irregular incremental striae; under a lens, it exhibits extremely close, minute, decussating spiral striae. The whorls of the protoconch are smooth.

The shell is dingy white and is irregularly striped and mottled with longitudinal dark-brown streaks.

There are seven slightly convex whorls, which are lightly marginate above and separated by a moderately impressed suture.

The aperture is oblique and oval, and is purplish brown internally. The peristome is acute and margined with brown; it is very lightly thickened internally, while the columellar margin is slightly reflexed. The columella terminates in a slight, flexuous, brown fold.

== Distribution ==
This species is endemic to the island of Molokai, Hawaii, in the United States.
