= Partulina mutabilis =

Scientific classification
- Kingdom: Animalia
- Phylum: Mollusca
- Class: Gastropoda
- Order: Stylommatophora
- Family: Achatinellidae
- Genus: Partulina
- Species: P. mutabilis

Binomial name
- Partulina mutabilis D. D. Baldwin, 1908

Synonyms
- Partulina (Eburnella) mutabilis D. D. Baldwin, 1908 alternative representation

Species of gastropod

Partulina mutabilis is a species of tropical air-breathing land snail, a terrestrial pulmonate gastropod mollusk in the family Achatinellidae.

== Description ==
The shell measures 16 mm in length and 10 mm in diameter.

(Original description) The shell is dextral or sinistral, minutely perforated, somewhat solid, and acuminately conical, with a subacute apex. Its surface is shining and marked with delicate incremental striae; under a lens, it exhibits very close, decussating spiral striae. The apical whorls are smooth.

The color varies from pure white to dark fulvous. The shell is often variously striped with brown lines and bands, some of which occur on the base and others spiral around the whorls.

The shell has six convex whorls, which are margined above, and the suture is well impressed. The aperture is oblique and oval, and appears white within. The columellar margin is reflexed. The peristome is acute and thickened within. The columella terminates in a well-developed, flexuous white fold.

== Distribution ==
This species is endemic to Hawaii and found on Maui Island
