= Partulina rufa =

- Shell of Partulina rufa (syntype at the Paleontological Research Institution)

Scientific classification
- Kingdom: Animalia
- Phylum: Mollusca
- Class: Gastropoda
- Order: Stylommatophora
- Family: Achatinellidae
- Genus: Partulina
- Species: P. rufa

Binomial name
- Partulina rufa (Newcombe, 1853)

Synonyms
- Achatinella rufa Newcomb, 1853 superseded combination; Partulina (Partulina) rufa (Newcomb, 1853) alternative representation

Species of gastropod

Partulina rufa is a species of tropical air-breathing land snail, a terrestrial pulmonate gastropod mollusk in the family Achatinellidae.

Subspecies

- Partulina rufa idae Borcherding, 1901

== Description ==
(Original description) The sinistral shell is conically ovate, and solid, with decussating striae. Its ground colour is brownish red both externally and internally, and it is covered by a mottled brown-and-white epidermis. On the central whorls, the white markings form fine zigzag patterns, which are lost on the body whorl, where the colour becomes uniform greyish umber.

The lower half of the body whorl is encircled by a broad white band. There are six flatly convex whorls, separated by a plain, moderately impressed suture. The columella is strongly calloused. The umbilicus is small and open. The lip is expanded and reflected below.

The length of the shell attains 22.9 mm; its diameter 12.7 mm.

== Distribution ==
This species is endemic to Hawaii and occurs on Molokai
