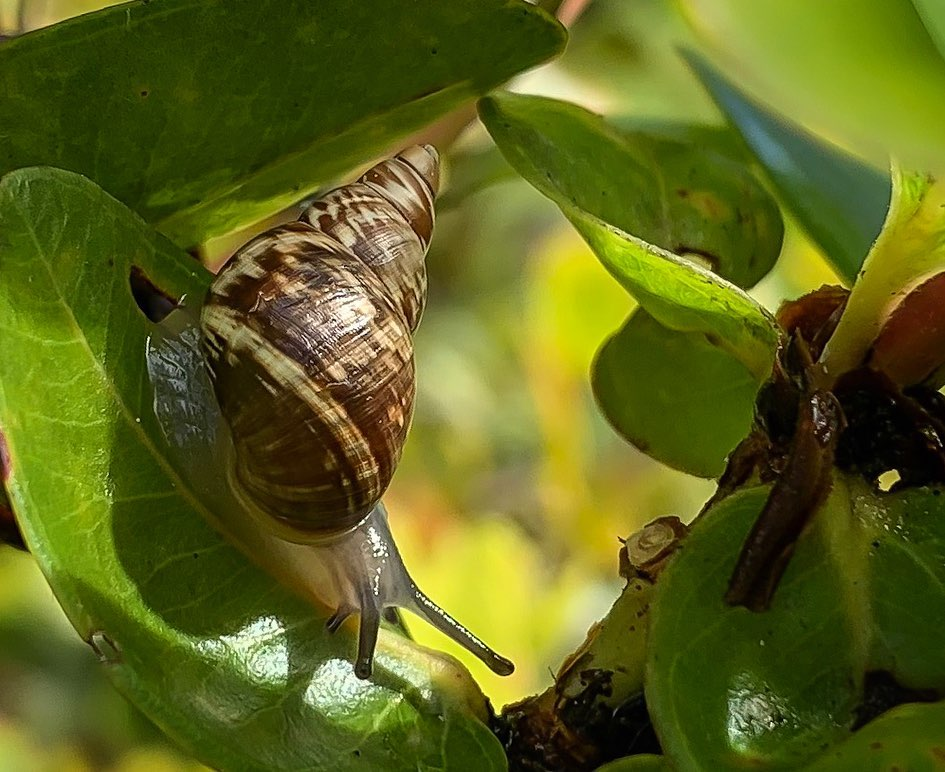

Conservation status
- Endangered (IUCN 2.3)

- Critically Imperiled (NatureServe)

Scientific classification
- Kingdom: Animalia
- Phylum: Mollusca
- Class: Gastropoda
- Order: Stylommatophora
- Family: Achatinellidae
- Genus: Partulina
- Species: P. physa

Binomial name
- Partulina physa (Newcomb, 1853)

Synonyms
- Achatinella (Partulina) hawaiiensis D. D. Baldwin, 1895 junior subjective synonym; Achatinella hawaiiensis D. D. Baldwin, 1895 junior subjective synonym; Achatinella physa Newcomb, 1854 superseded combination; Partulina (Baldwinia) physa (Newcomb, 1854) alternative representation

= Partulina physa =

Species of gastropod

Partulina physa is a species of tropical air-breathing land snail, a terrestrial pulmonate gastropod mollusk in the family Achatinellidae.

Sunspecies

- Partulina physa errans Pilsbry & C. M. Cooke, 1913
- Partulina physa konana Pilsbry & C. M. Cooke, 1914

== Description ==
(Original description in Latin) The shell is sinistral, inflated below, and has an acuminate apex. There are six rounded, non-marginate whorls. The aperture is ovate. The columella is short, flat, and slightly plicate. The outer lip is expanded and thickened internally. The suture is well impressed, and the umbilicus is somewhat open.

The shell is greyish white above, faintly spotted with brown, and grey below. The body whorl is encircled by a narrow, whitish band.

== Distribution ==
This species is endemic to Hawaii and occurs on Mouna Kea
