= Partulina anceyana =

- Shell of Partulina anceyana (original image)

Scientific classification
- Kingdom: Animalia
- Phylum: Mollusca
- Class: Gastropoda
- Order: Stylommatophora
- Family: Achatinellidae
- Genus: Partulina
- Species: P. anceyana

Binomial name
- Partulina anceyana (D. D. Baldwin, 1895)

Synonyms
- Achatinella (Partulina) anceyana D. D. Baldwin, 1895 superseded combination; Partulina (Eburnella) anceyana (D. D. Baldwin, 1895) alternative representation

Species of gastropod

Partulina anceyana is a species of tropical air-breathing land snail, a terrestrial pulmonate gastropod mollusk in the family Achatinellidae.

== Description ==
The length of the shell attains 14.5 mm, its diameter 9 mm.

(Original description) The shell is dextral, imperforate, and rather thin. It has an ovately conical form and an obtuse apex. Its surface is shining and striated by fine growth lines; under a lens, it exhibits a beautiful pattern of close, delicate, decussating spiral striae, which extend to the very apex.

The shell is reddish brown, becoming paler towards the summit. It bears two yellow bands: a broad band encircling the umbilical region and a narrow band at the periphery. The latter is margined above by a delicate white line, which continues onto the spire just above the suture and becomes lost on the third whorl. A narrow white spiral line also runs below the suture to the very tip of the apex.

There are five convex, non-marginate whorls, separated by a distinctly impressed suture.

The aperture is slightly oblique and oval, and is white internally, distinctly showing the dark colouration of the exterior. The peristome is acute and slightly thickened internally; the external colouration appears along its inner edge. The columella is brown and terminates in a well-developed, flexuous fold.

When extended during locomotion, the animal is longer than its shell. The mantle is light brown and mottled with black; its outer edge is encircled by an interrupted orange band.

The foot is very light brown on both its upper and lower surfaces. Its superior portion has a slate-coloured tinge, while the posterior portion tapers and is sometimes tinged with yellow. The tentacles are long and light slate in colour. The upper surface of the head is minutely granulated.

== Distribution ==
This species is endemic to Hawaii and occurs on the island Maui.

It has the peculiar habit of living on the foliage near the tops of trees.
