= Partulina plumbea =

- Shell of Partulina plumbea

Scientific classification
- Kingdom: Animalia
- Phylum: Mollusca
- Class: Gastropoda
- Order: Stylommatophora
- Family: Achatinellidae
- Genus: Partulina
- Species: P. plumbea

Binomial name
- Partulina plumbea (Gulick, 1856)

Synonyms
- Achatinella plumbea Gulick, 1856 superseded combination; Partulina (Partulina) plumbea (Gulick, 1856) alternative representation

Species of gastropod

Partulina plumbea is a species of tropical air-breathing land snail, a terrestrial pulmonate gastropod mollusk in the family Achatinellidae.

== Description ==
The shell measures 0.90 inch (28 mm) in length and 0.50 inch (18 mm) in breadth. The body whorl measures 0.64 inch (16.3 mm) in length.

(Original description) The shell is dextral, sometimes perforate, ovate-conic, and solid. It is shining, irregularly striated, and very finely decussated. Its color is lead-colored, with a white band on the periphery of the body whorl. The apex is subacute, and the spire is conical. The suture is marginate and well impressed.

The shell has six and a half very convex whorls. The columellar fold is central, white, and strong. The aperture is slightly oblique and sinuately oval, appearing bluish-white within. The peristome is brown and thickened within. The dextral margin is arcuate and scarcely reflected, while the columellar margin is dilated, white, and sometimes slightly detached. The parietal margin is absent.

== Distribution ==
This species is endemic to Hawaii and occurs on Maui.
