= Partulina arnemanni =

Scientific classification
- Kingdom: Animalia
- Phylum: Mollusca
- Class: Gastropoda
- Order: Stylommatophora
- Family: Achatinellidae
- Genus: Partulina
- Species: P. arnemanni

Binomial name
- Partulina arnemanni C. M. Cooke & Y. Kondo, 1952

Synonyms
- Partulina (Partulina) arnemanni C. M. Cooke & Y. Kondo, 1952 alternative representation

Species of gastropod

Partulina arnemanni is a species of tropical air-breathing land snail, a terrestrial pulmonate gastropod mollusk in the family Achatinellidae.

== Description ==
The length of the shell attains 22.4 mm, its diameter is 14.3 mm.

== Distribution ==
This species is endemic to Hawaii and a fossil was found near Kahuku.
