= Partulina aptycha =

- Shell of Partulina aptycha (original image)

Scientific classification
- Kingdom: Animalia
- Phylum: Mollusca
- Class: Gastropoda
- Order: Stylommatophora
- Family: Achatinellidae
- Genus: Partulina
- Species: P. aptycha

Binomial name
- Partulina aptycha (L. Pfeiffer, 1855) sensu Cowie et al., 1995

Synonyms
- Partulina (Partulina) aptycha (L. Pfeiffer, 1855) sensu Cowie et al., 1995 · alternative representation

Species of gastropod

Partulina aptycha is a species of tropical air-breathing land snail, a terrestrial pulmonate gastropod mollusk in the family Achatinellidae.

== Description ==
The length of the shell attains 21.5 mm, its diameter 10 mm.

(Original description in Latin) The shell is imperforate, dextral, oblong-conical, and rather thin. It is finely striated, somewhat shining, and white, ornamented with punctate, chestnut-coloured bands.

The spire is elongately conical, with a somewhat obtuse apex. The suture is subsimple. There are 6½ slightly convex whorls; the body whorl is almost equal to half the length of the shell and is rounded at the base.

The aperture is oblique and truncately oval, and is milky white internally. The columellar plica is obsolete, and the shell is slightly twisted. The peristome is simple and very slightly thickened internally; the right margin is straight, while the columellar margin is narrow and adnate.

== Distribution ==
This species is endemic to Hawaii.
