= Partulina kapuana =

- Shell of Partulina kapuana (original image)

Scientific classification
- Kingdom: Animalia
- Phylum: Mollusca
- Class: Gastropoda
- Order: Stylommatophora
- Family: Achatinellidae
- Genus: Partulina
- Species: P. kapuana

Binomial name
- Partulina kapuana Baldwin, 1906

Synonyms
- Partulina (Baldwinia) kapuana J. J. Gouveia & A. Gouveia, 1920 alternative representation

Species of gastropod

Partulina kapuana is a species of tropical air-breathing land snail, a terrestrial pulmonate gastropod mollusk in the family Achatinellidae.

== Description ==
The shell measures 24 mm in length and 14 mm in diameter.

(Original description) The sinistral shell is translucent. It has an acute apex and a slightly concave spire. Its surface is shining. In adult specimens, the first two whorls are nearly uniformly light brown, while the third, fourth, fifth, and sixth whorls are brown and marked obliquely with white zigzag lines.

The body whorl is lighter in color than the upper whorls. It gradually becomes lighter and nearly pure white just behind the lip. A white band lies just below the periphery, and its upper margin is bordered by a slightly darker shade of brown.

The shell has seven whorls. The first five are slightly convex, whereas the last is very much inflated, rounded at the periphery, and forms a little more than half of the shell. The suture is simple and slightly impressed.

The white columella is simple and nearly straight. It is slightly convex below and broader above, where it covers a deep circular umbilicus. The aperture is large and semi-ovate, and appears white within. The margin of the lip is thin and edged externally with a very narrow dark line; it is slightly thickened within.

== Distribution ==
This species is endemic to Kona, Hawaii.
