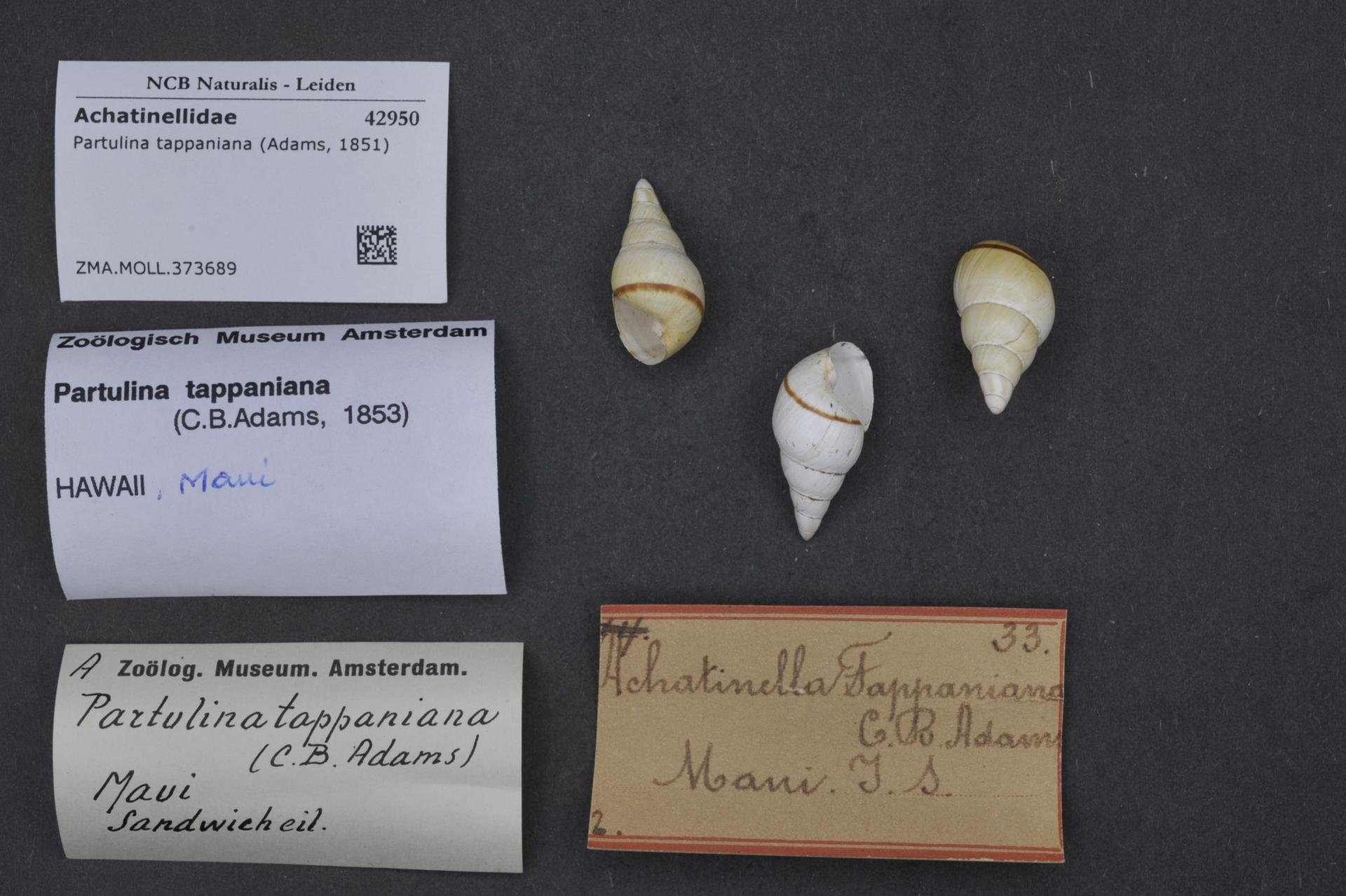
- Shell of Partulina tappaniana (specimen at Naturalis_Biodiversity_Center)

Conservation status
- Endangered (IUCN 2.3)

- Critically Imperiled (NatureServe)

Scientific classification
- Kingdom: Animalia
- Phylum: Mollusca
- Class: Gastropoda
- Order: Stylommatophora
- Family: Achatinellidae
- Genus: Partulina
- Species: P. tappaniana

Binomial name
- Partulina tappaniana (C. B. Adams, 1851)

Synonyms
- Achatinella lutea L. Pfeiffer, 1876 nomen nudum; Achatinella tappaniana C. B. Adams, 1851 superseded combination; Partulina (Partulina) tappaniana (C. B. Adams, 1851) alternative representation

= Partulina tappaniana =

- Shell of Partulina tappaniana carnicolor (specimen at the Bailey-Matthews National Shell Museum )

Species of gastropod

Partulina tappaniana is a species of tropical air-breathing land snail, a terrestrial pulmonate gastropod mollusk in the family Achatinellidae.

Subspecies

- Partulina tappaniana ampulla (Gulick, 1856)
- Partulina tappaniana carnicolor D. D. Baldwin, 1906
- Partulina tappaniana tappaniana (C. B. Adams, 1851)

== Description ==
(Original description) The shell is reversed and elongate-ovate-conic. It is pure white and shows a single narrow brown spiral band encircling the periphery of the body whorl. Its surface bears very unequal and irregular transverse striae, together with numerous excessively minute, wrinkled, spiral impressed lines. The apex is subacute, and the spire is elongate, with slightly curvilinear outlines. The shell contains nearly seven whorls; they are moderately convex and more or less subangular, margined above by a well-impressed suture. The aperture is ovate; the lip is well thickened within its margin, expanded considerably anteriorly but not above, and the columellar fold is strong.

The mean divergence is 43°; the length of he shell is 1.06 inch (26.9 mm); its diameter 0.55 inch (14.0 mm); the length of the aperture is 0.44 inch (11.2 mm).

== Distribution ==
This species is endemic to Hawaii in the United States.
