= Tubuaia =

Scientific classification
- Kingdom: Animalia
- Phylum: Mollusca
- Class: Gastropoda
- Order: Stylommatophora
- Family: Achatinellidae
- Genus: Tubuaia; Cooke & Kondo, 1960

Genus of gastropods

Tubuaia is a genus of air-breathing land snails, terrestrial pulmonate gastropod mollusks in the family Achatinellidae.

== Species ==
There are 18 species plus several subspecies. The 18 species are as follows:

- Tubuaia affinis
- Tubuaia amoebodonta
- Tubuaia bakerorum
- Tubuaia coprophora
- Tubuaia cremnobates
- Tubuaia cylindrata
- Tubuaia fosbergi
- Tubuaia garrettiana
- Tubuaia gouldi
- Tubuaia hendersoni
- Tubuaia hygrobia
- Tubuaia inconstans
- Tubuaia myojinae
- Tubuaia perplexa
- Tubuaia raoulensis
- Tubuaia saintjohni
- Tubuaia saproderma
- Tubuaia voyana
