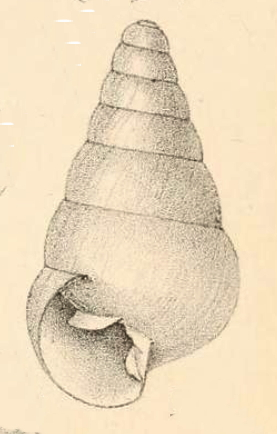
- Shell of Gulickia alexandri (holotype)

Conservation status
- Critically Endangered (IUCN 2.3)

- Critically Imperiled (NatureServe)

Scientific classification
- Kingdom: Animalia
- Phylum: Mollusca
- Class: Gastropoda
- Order: Stylommatophora
- Family: Achatinellidae
- Genus: Gulickia; Cooke, 1915
- Species: G. alexandri

Binomial name
- Gulickia alexandri Cooke, 1915

= Gulickia =

Monotypic genus of snails endemic to Hawaii

Gulickia is a monotypic genus of land snails in the family Achatinellidae.

Its sole species, Gulickia alexandri, is a critically endangered species endemic to the island of Maui in Hawaii.

== Description of Gulickia alexandri ==
The shell measures 3.5 mm in length and 1.7 mm in diameter, with the axis of the aperture reaching 1.3 mm. The parietal lamella stands 0.22 mm in height. The shell is sinistral and minutely perforate, characterized by an acutely conical, turreted form. It is composed of a thin, corneous, and subdiaphanous material that possesses a shining luster. The surface is nearly smooth, though it is marked by minute striae following the lines of growth. The spire is conical, terminating in a somewhat obtuse apex, while the whorls of the protoconch exhibit a very fine spiral striation. The suture is simple and only slightly impressed. The 6 3/4 whorls are slightly convex and increase slowly in size; they appear somewhat compressed, with the upper whorls being convex and the body whorl becoming more rotund. This body whorl is slightly angular at its commencement but remains convex at the base. The aperture is somewhat oblique and ovate in shape. Within, the parietal lamella is quite strong, very oblique, and arcuate, featuring a minutely and irregularly serrate edge. The columella is nearly straight—though it appears slightly sigmoid in immature specimens—and narrowly triangular, equipped with two well-developed, oblique lamellae. The peristome is simple, thin, and unexpanded, while the outer margin is gracefully arcuate.

== Distribution ==
This species occurs off Maui island, Hawaii.
