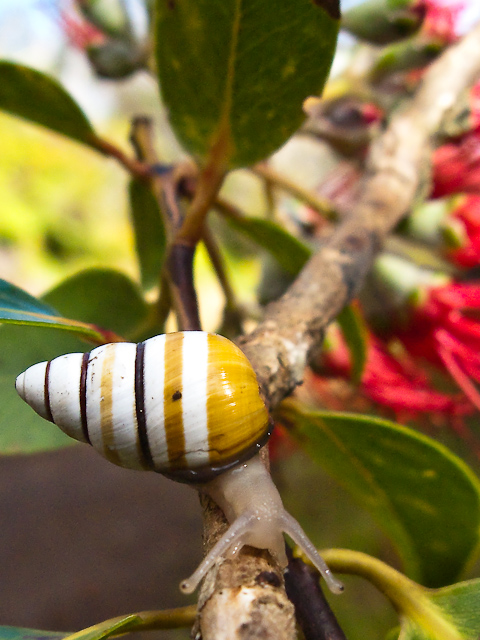

Conservation status
- Endangered (IUCN 2.3)

- Critically Imperiled (NatureServe)

Scientific classification
- Kingdom: Animalia
- Phylum: Mollusca
- Class: Gastropoda
- Order: Stylommatophora
- Family: Achatinellidae
- Genus: Partulina
- Species: P. mighelsiana

Binomial name
- Partulina mighelsiana (Pfeiffer, 1847)

= Partulina mighelsiana =

Species of gastropod

Partulina mighelsiana is a species of tropical air-breathing land snail, a terrestrial pulmonate gastropod mollusk in the family Achatinellidae. This species is endemic to Moloka'i, Hawaii in the United States.

== Description ==
This snail species has a striped shell that consists of different shades of brown, black, and white. Their body is a transparent brown color.

== Habitat ==
Partulina mighelsiana is found in very small and fragmented populations. Although it is not considered to be endangered, it is seriously threatened, similar to many other Hawaiian tree snails in the subfamily Achatinellinae. It is terrestrial and is found in trees, trunks, stems, and leaves that have fungi. They are threatened by habitat destruction, over-collecting, and predation by introduced rats, Oxychilus, and possibly Euglandina.
