= Snail extinction prevention program =

Wildlife conservation program in Hawaii

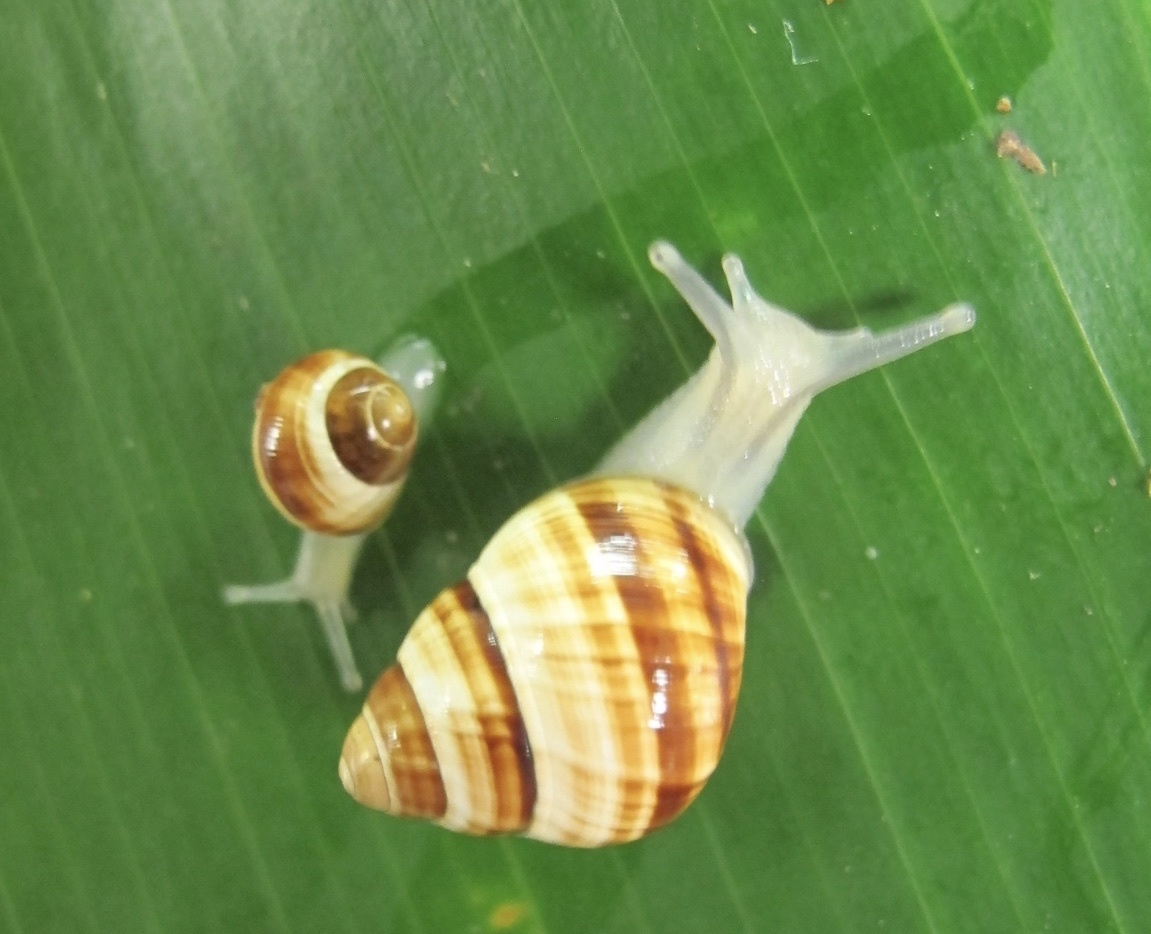
Achatinella fuscobasis

The snail extinction prevention program (SEPP) or Hawai’i snail extinction prevention program, is a partnership between US Fish and Wildlife Service, the Hawai’i Department of Land and Natural Resources-Division of Forestry and Wildlife and the University of Hawai’i founded in 2012 and currently directed by David R. Sischo (Note: For staff list see https://dlnr.hawaii.gov/ecosystems/sepp/.) that is trying to prevent the extinction of Hawai’i’s many rare snails such as Achatinella and Amastrids.

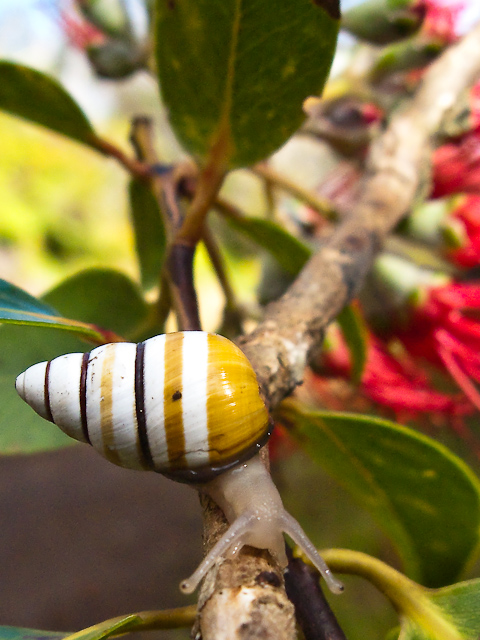
Partulina mighelsiana

== Actions taken ==
=== Snail enclosures ===
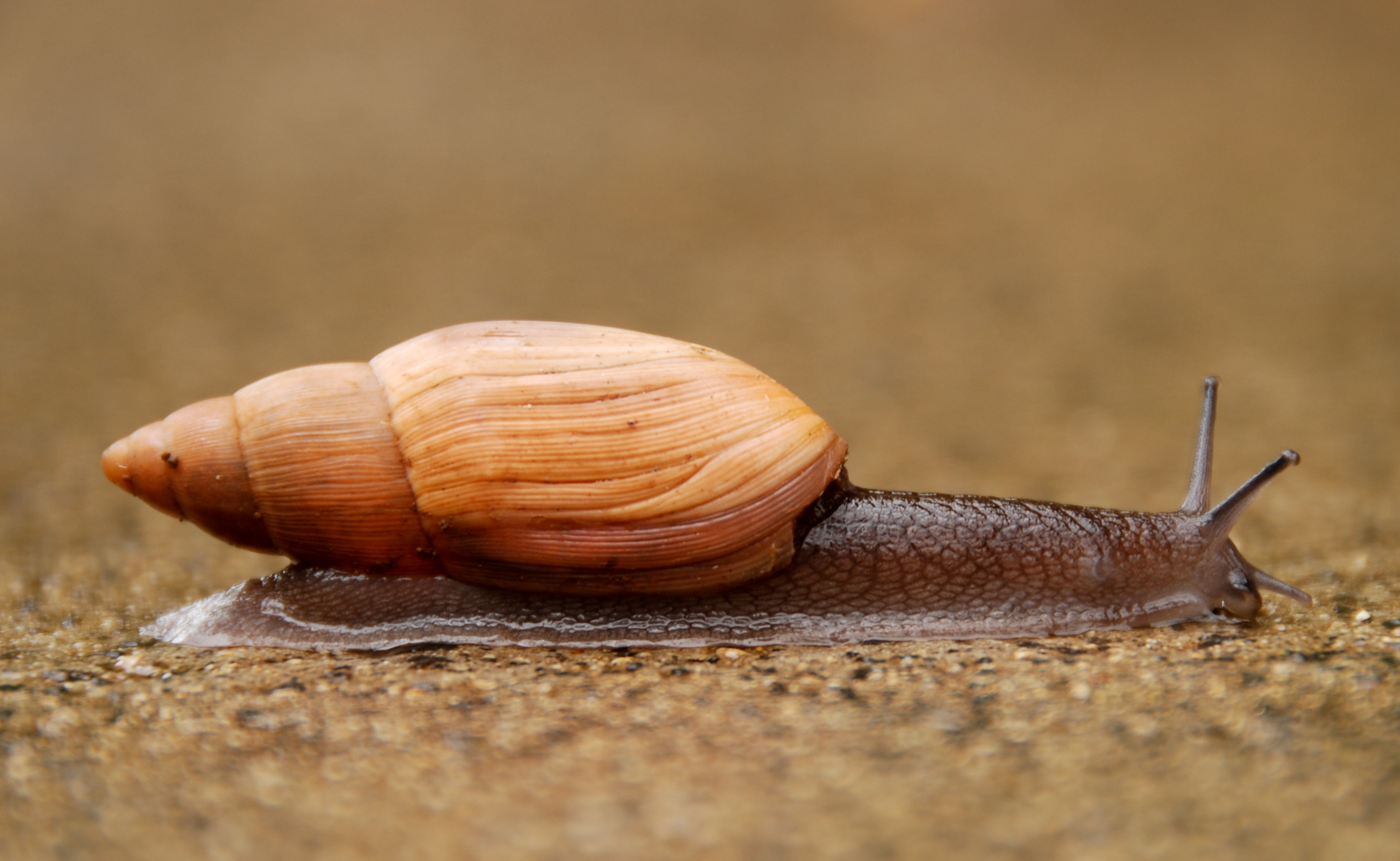
The Rosy Wolfsnail (Euglandina rosea), one of the main causes of Hawaiian snail extinction

One of the ways the SEPP tries to save those rare snails is by keeping them in an fenced and constantly monitored enclosure in the Hawaiian forest that keeps them away from invasive snails, such as the Rosy Wolfsnail (Note: Rosy Wolfsnails are the main threat to native snails) and other introduced predators, such as the Jackson's chameleon, the land flatworm Platydemus manokwari, other invasive snails, and various types of rat.

==== Enclosure walls ====
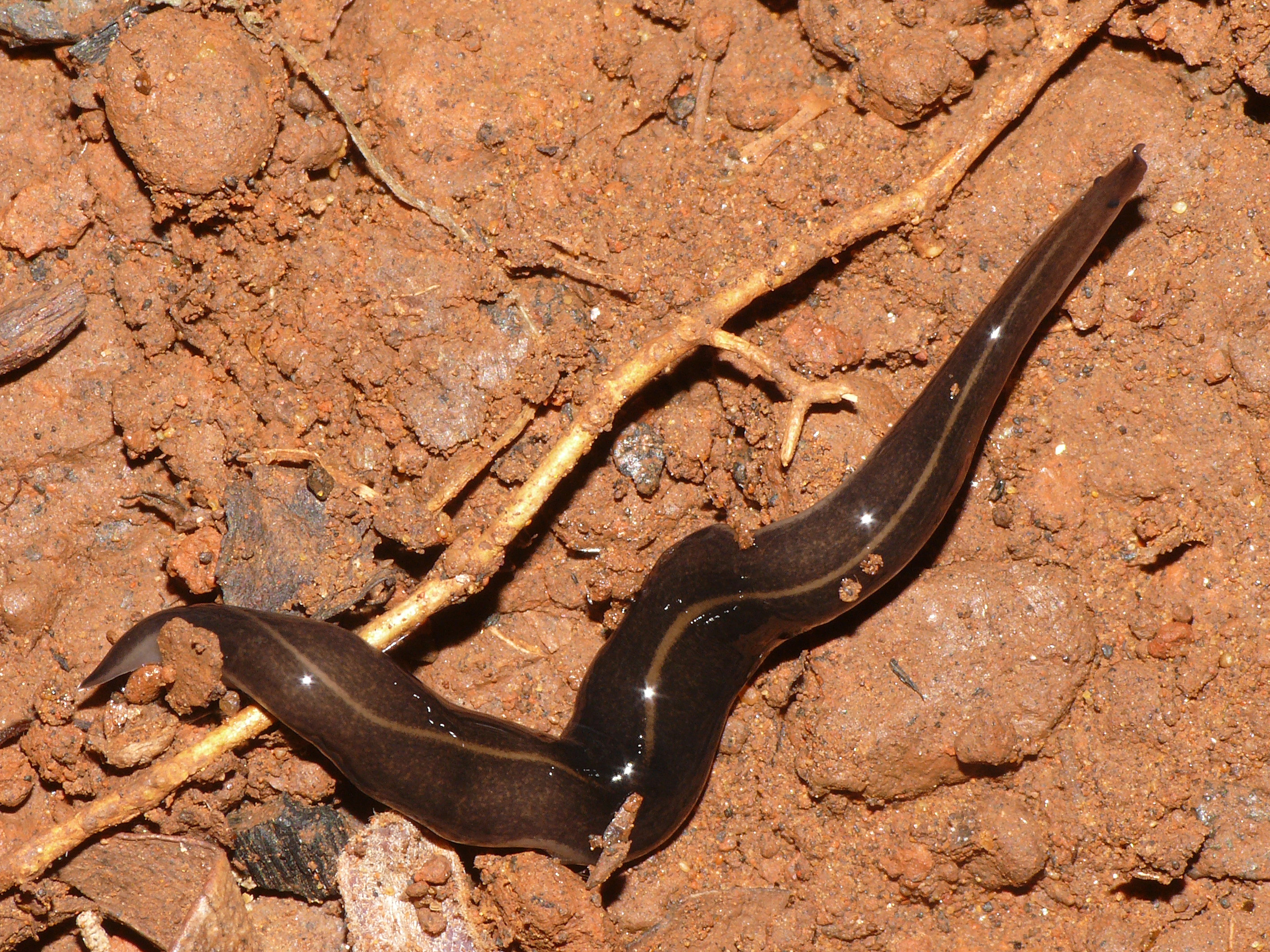
Platydemus manokwari, a predatory flatworm that poses a threat to Hawaiian snails

The walls of the SEPP snail enclosures includes a smooth lined wall to prevent chameleons, a steel fence, protected with a rim and salt to ensure that Rosy Wolfsnails do not climb over the fence. Behind the steel fence, there are electric wires and copper mesh to prevent any wolfsnails that do get in from swallowing the native snails whole.

=== Lab snails ===
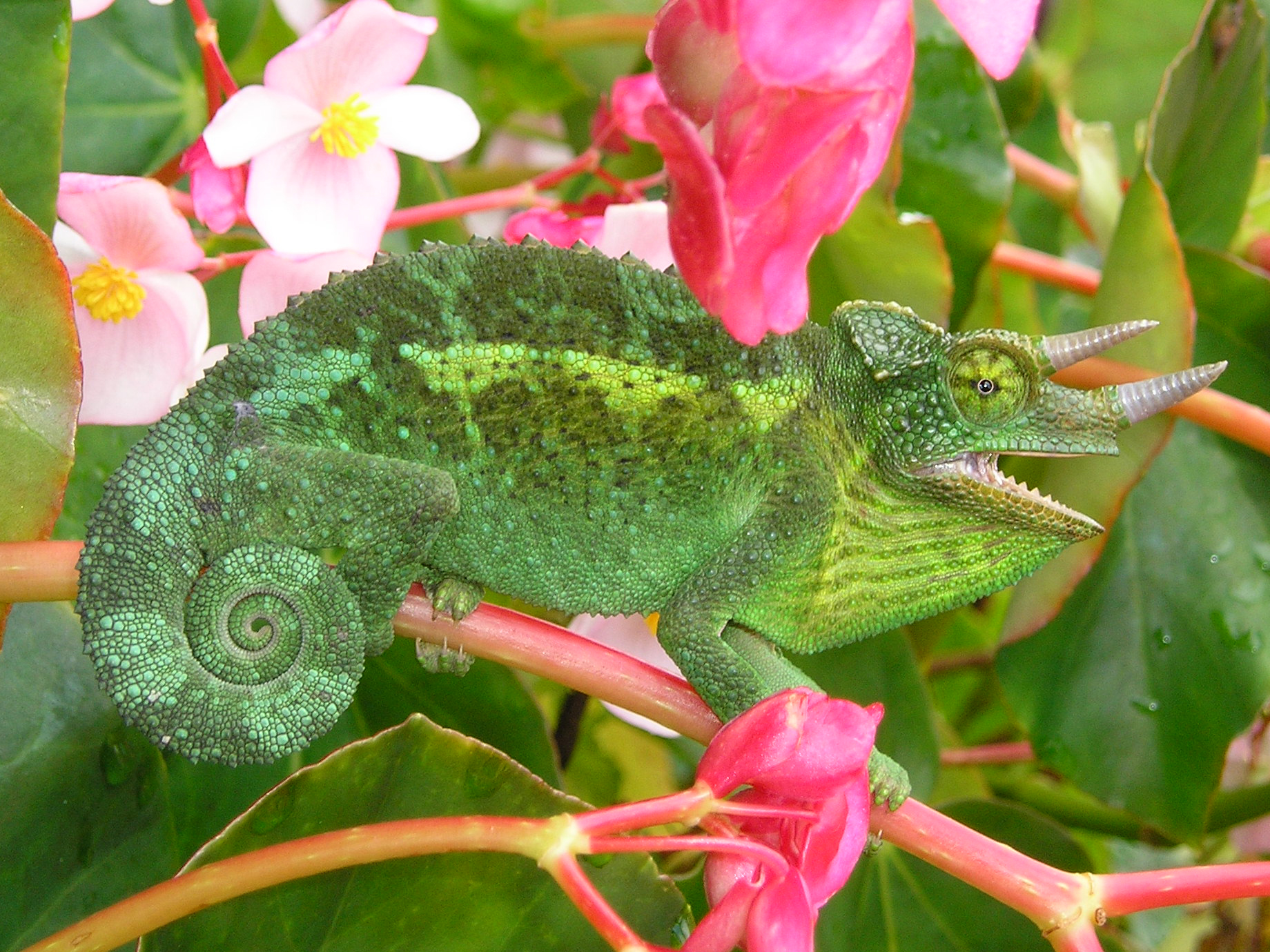
The Jackson's Chameleon, one of the invasive species that eat Hawaiian tree snails

The SEPP also keeps snails in a laboratory in Kawainui Marsh, Oahu, Hawaii.

=== Evacuation ===
In 2018 Hurricane Lane approached the lab and the snails that lived in the lab had to be evacuated. There are ongoing concerns about future evacuation problems since as of 2022 there are over five thousand snails living in the lab, while there were fewer snails living in the lab in 2018. (Note: In 2020, when Hurricane Douglas approached the area the snails also had to be evacuated.)

=== Achatinella pupukanioe ===
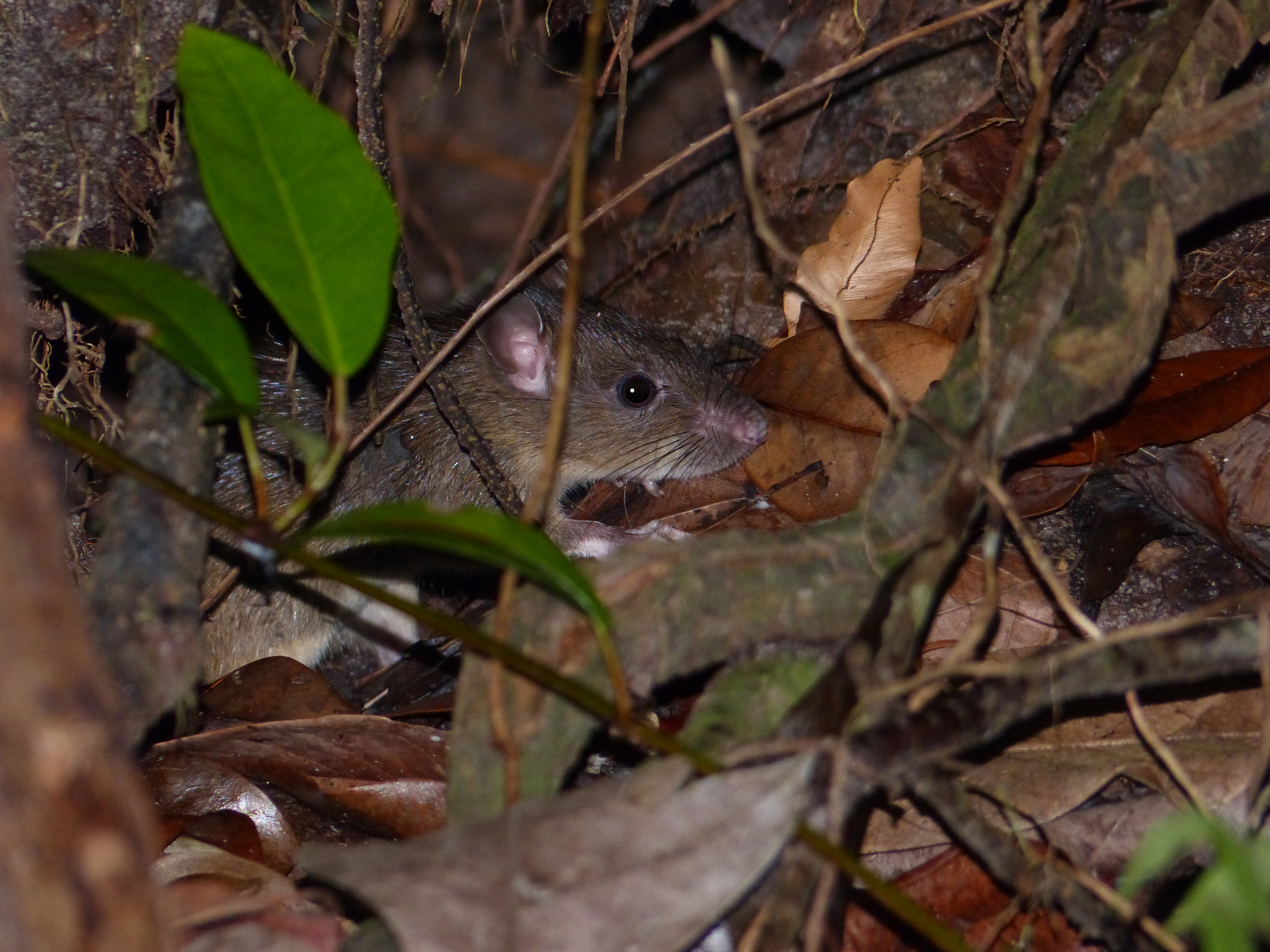
The Black rat, one of the invasive species that eat native snails.

In 2015, the SEPP team found a tree full of Achatinella pupukanioe, (Note: Image of live Achatinella pupukanioe, Flickr.com) a species thought to be extinct since the 1980s. The SEPP decided to leave them alone, but a few years later when they went to collect the snails for the lab they were gone, possibly swallowed whole by rosy wolfsnails.

== See also ==
- Achatinella
- Partulina
- Achatinella pupukanioe
- Euglandina rosea
- Amastridae
