= Tekoulina =

Scientific classification
- Kingdom: Animalia
- Phylum: Mollusca
- Class: Gastropoda
- Order: Stylommatophora
- Family: Achatinellidae
- Subfamily: Tekoulininae; Solem, 1972
- Genus: Tekoulina; Solem, 1972

Genus of gastropods

Tekoulina is a genus of gastropod in the family Achatinellidae, and the only member of the subfamily Tekoulininae. It was formerly allocated to the family Veronicellidae - the leatherleaf slugs.

It contains only one species Tekoulina pricei and is known to be viviparous. It is endemic to Rarotonga in the Cook Islands.
