= Turbonilla varicosa =

Scientific classification
- Kingdom: Animalia
- Phylum: Mollusca
- Class: Gastropoda
- Family: Pyramidellidae
- Genus: Turbonilla
- Species: T. varicosa

Binomial name
- Turbonilla varicosa (A. Adams, 1855)

Synonyms
- Chemnitzia coppingeri E.A. Smith, 1884; Chemnitzia varicosa A. Adams, 1855; Proto cornelliana Newcomb, 1870; Turbonilla bella Dall & Bartsch, 1906; Turbonilla cornelliana (Newcomb, 1870); Turbonilla decussata Pease, 1861; Turbonilla vitiensis Pilsbry, 1917

Species of gastropod

Turbonilla varicosa is a species of sea snail, a marine gastropod mollusk in the family Pyramidellidae, the pyrams and their allies.
