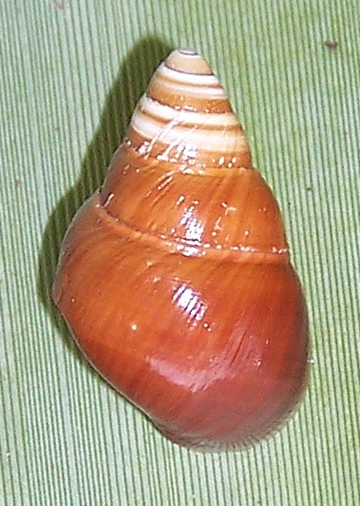
- Partulina variabilis

Scientific classification
- Kingdom: Animalia
- Phylum: Mollusca
- Class: Gastropoda
- Order: Stylommatophora
- Family: Achatinellidae
- Genus: Partulina; Pfeiffer, 1854

Synonyms
- Achatinella (Baldwinia) Ancey, 1899; Achatinella (Eburnella) Pease, 1870 junior subjective synonym; Achatinella (Partulina) L. Pfeiffer, 1854 superseded rank; Eburnella Pease, 1870 superseded combination; Partulina (Baldwinia) Ancey, 1899 alternative representation; Partulina (Eburnella) Pease, 1870 alternative representation; Partulina (Partulina) L. Pfeiffer, 1854 alternative representation; Partulina (Partulinella) Hyatt, 1914 junior subjective synonym; Rugosella Coen, 1945 (unavailable name - no description, no type species originally designated) ·

= Partulina =

Genus of gastropods

Partulina is a genus of tropical air-breathing land snails, terrestrial pulmonate gastropod mollusks in the family Achatinellidae.

== Description ==
(Original description in German) The shell is typically perforated or slightly umbilicated, featuring an outer lip that is notably expanded. The columellar fold is situated high within the aperture, though it remains more or less indistinct.

(Described in Latin as Partulina (Baldwinia) ) The shell is closely related to Partulina, but it differs in several key aspects. It is generally thinner in structure, featuring a peristome that is only slightly thickened and somewhat expanded. Most notably, it is distinguished by the complete absence of a twisted columellar fold.

== Species ==
Species within the genus Partulina include:

- Partulina anceyana (D. D. Baldwin, 1895)
- Partulina aptycha L. Pfeiffer, 1855 sensu Cowie et al., 1995
- Partulina arnemanni C. M. Cooke & Y. Kondo, 1952
- Partulina confusa (Sykes, 1900)
- †Partulina crassa (Newcomb, 1854)
- Partulina dolei (D. D. Baldwin, 1895)
- Partulina dubia (Newcomb, 1853)
- Partulina dubiosa (C. B. Adams, 1851)
- Partulina dwightii (Newcomb, 1855)
- Partulina errans Pilsbry & C. M. Cooke, 1913
- Partulina fasciata (Gulick, 1856)
- Partulina fusoidea (Newcomb, 1855): synonym of Partulina terebra fusoidea (Newcomb, 1855) (superseded rank)
- Partulina germana (Newcomb, 1854)
- Partulina grisea (Newcomb, 1854)
- Partulina hobdyi Severns, 2011
- Partulina horneri (D. D. Baldwin, 1895)
- Partulina induta (Gulick, 1856)
- Partulina kapuana J. J. Gouveia & A. Gouveia, 1920
- Partulina lignaria (Gulick, 1856)
- Partulina marmorata (A. A. Gould, 1847)
- Partulina mighelsiana (L. Pfeiffer, 1848)
- Partulina montagui Pilsbry, 1913
- Partulina mutabilis D. D. Baldwin, 1908
- Partulina nattii (Hartman, 1888)
- Partulina perdix (Reeve, 1850)
- Partulina physa (Newcomb, 1854)
- Partulina plumbea (Gulick, 1856)
- Partulina porcellana (Newcomb, 1854)
- Partulina proxima (Pease, 1862)
- Partulina puupiliensis Severns, 2011
- Partulina radiata (A. A. Gould, 1845)
- Partulina redfieldi (Newcomb, 1853)
- Partulina rufa (Newcomb, 1853)
- Partulina semicarinata (Newcomb, 1854)
- Partulina splendida (Newcomb, 1853)
- Partulina subpolita Pilsbry & C. M. Cooke, 1912
- Partulina talpina Gulick, 1856: synonym of Partulina splendida (Newcomb, 1853)
- Partulina tappaniana (C. B. Adams, 1851)
- Partulina terebra (Newcomb, 1854)
- Partulina tessellata (Newcomb, 1853)
- Partulina thaanumiana Pilsbry, 1913
- Partulina theodorei (D. D. Baldwin, 1895)
- Partulina ustulata (Gulick, 1856)
- Partulina variabilis (Newcomb, 1854)
- Partulina virgulata (Mighels, 1845)

== Synonyms ==
- Partulina ampulla (Gulick, 1856): synonym of Partulina tappaniana ampulla (Gulick, 1856) (superseded rank)
- Partulina aptycha (L. Pfeiffer, 1855): synonym of Achatinella pulcherrima aptycha L. Pfeiffer, 1855 (superseded rank)
- Partulina carnicolor D. D. Baldwin, 1906: synonym of Partulina tappaniana carnicolor D. D. Baldwin, 1906 (superseded rank)
- Partulina compta Pease, 1869: synonym of Partulina dwightii compta Pease, 1869 (superseded rank)
- Partulina cooperi D. D. Baldwin, 1906: synonym of Achatinella wailuaensis Sykes, 1900: synonym of Partulina porcellana wailuaensis (Sykes, 1900) (junior subjective synonym)
- Partulina crocea (Gulick, 1856): synonym of Partulina lignaria crocea (Gulick, 1856) (superseded rank)
- Partulina denselineata (Reeve, 1850): synonym of Partulina radiata (A. A. Gould, 1845) (junior subjective synonym)
- Partulina flemingi D. D. Baldwin, 1906: synonym of Partulina porcellana flemingi D. D. Baldwin, 1906 (superseded combination)
- Partulina fulvicans D. D. Baldwin, 1906: synonym of Partulina porcellana fulvicans D. D. Baldwin, 1906 (superseded rank)
- Partulina fusoidea (Newcomb, 1855): synonym of Partulina terebra fusoidea (Newcomb, 1855) (superseded rank)
- Partulina gouldi Newcomb, 1853: synonym of Achatinella gouldii Newcomb, 1853: synonym of Achatinella talpina Gulick, 1856: synonym of Partulina splendida (Newcomb, 1853) (misspelling - incorrect subsequent spelling)
- Partulina hayseldeni D. D. Baldwin, 1896: synonym of Partulina semicarinata hayseldeni D. D. Baldwin, 1896 (superseded rank)
- Partulina idae Borcherding, 1901: synonym of Partulina rufa idae Borcherding, 1901 (superseded combination)
- Partulina kaaeana D. D. Baldwin, 1906: synonym of Partulina induta kaaeana D. D. Baldwin, 1906 (superseded rank)
- Partulina konana Pilsbry & C. M. Cooke, 1914: synonym of Partulina physa konana Pilsbry & C. M. Cooke, 1914 (superseded rank)
- Partulina lemmoni D. D. Baldwin, 1906: synonym of Partulina dolei (D. D. Baldwin, 1895) (junior subjective synonym)
- Partulina macrodon Borcherding, 1901: synonym of Partulina dwightii macrodon Borcherding, 1901 (superseded rank)
- Partulina meyeri Borcherding, 1901: synonym of Partulina tessellata meyeri Borcherding, 1901 (superseded rank)
- Partulina nivea (D. D. Baldwin, 1895): synonym of Partulina tappaniana tappaniana (C. B. Adams, 1851)
- Partulina redfieldii [sic]: synonym of Partulina redfieldi (Newcomb, 1853) (misspelling - incorrect subsequent spelling)
- Partulina schauinslandi Borcherding, 1901: synonym of Partulina proxima schauinslandi Borcherding, 1901 (superseded rank)
- Partulina talpina (Gulick, 1856): synonym of Partulina splendida (Newcomb, 1853)
- Partulina winniei D. D. Baldwin, 1908: synonym of Partulina terebra winniei D. D. Baldwin, 1908 (superseded combination)
