= Wesley Newcomb =

American physician and malacologist

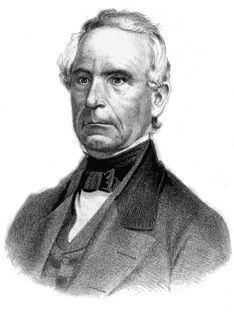
- Wesley Newcomb
- Born: 1808; New York City
- Died: January 26, 1892 (aged 83–84); Ithaca, New York
- Scientific career
- Fields: malacology

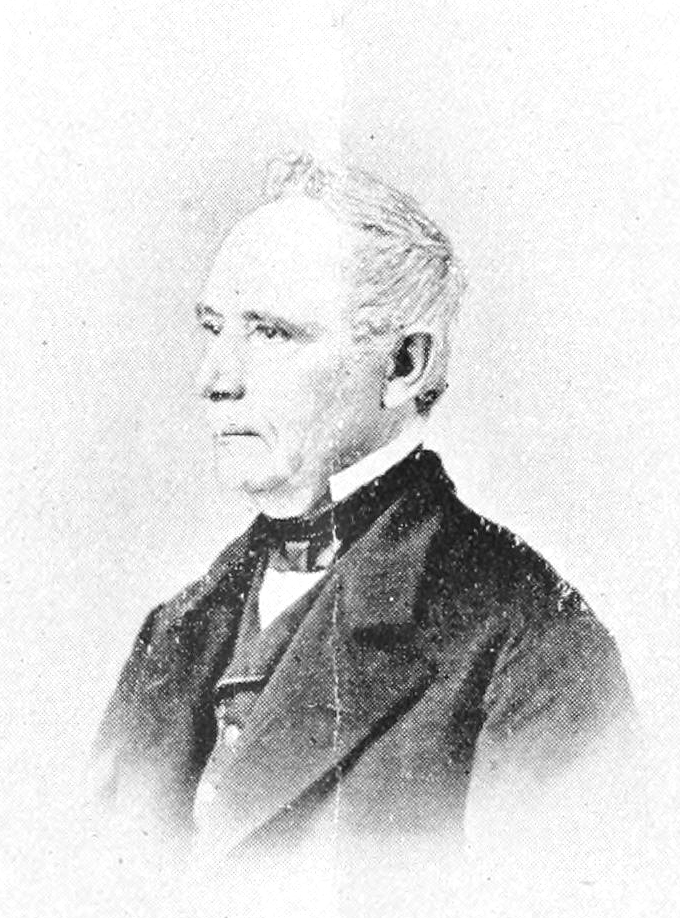
Wesley Newcomb

Wesley Newcomb (1808–January 26, 1892) was an American physician and a malacologist who specialized in land snails.

== Life ==
Wesley Newcomb was born in New York in 1818. His father was physician Simon Newcomb. He studied medicine at the Jefferson Medical College (now Thomas Jefferson University) and Castleton Medical College in Vermont. He traveled to San Francisco in 1849, and Honolulu, Hawaii in 1850. He went into practice with Dr. William Hillebrand, who married his stepdaughter Anna Post on November 16, 1852. He identified over a hundred new species of snails.

In 1856 he returned to New York, before visiting Europe in 1857. In 1858 he practiced in Oakland, California. In 1867 his collection was bought by Ezra Cornell, and he moved to Cornell University. From 1870 to 1888 he was curator of the Cornell Museum. He died in Ithaca, New York on January 26, 1892.

== Some species named by Newcomb ==
- Modiola peasei Newcomb, 1870 is a synonym of Amygdalum peasei (Newcomb, 1870)
- Mya hemphilli Newcomb, 1874 is a synonym of Mya arenaria Linnaeus, 1758
- Proto cornelliana Newcomb, 1870 is a synonym of Turbonilla varicosa (A. Adams, 1855)
