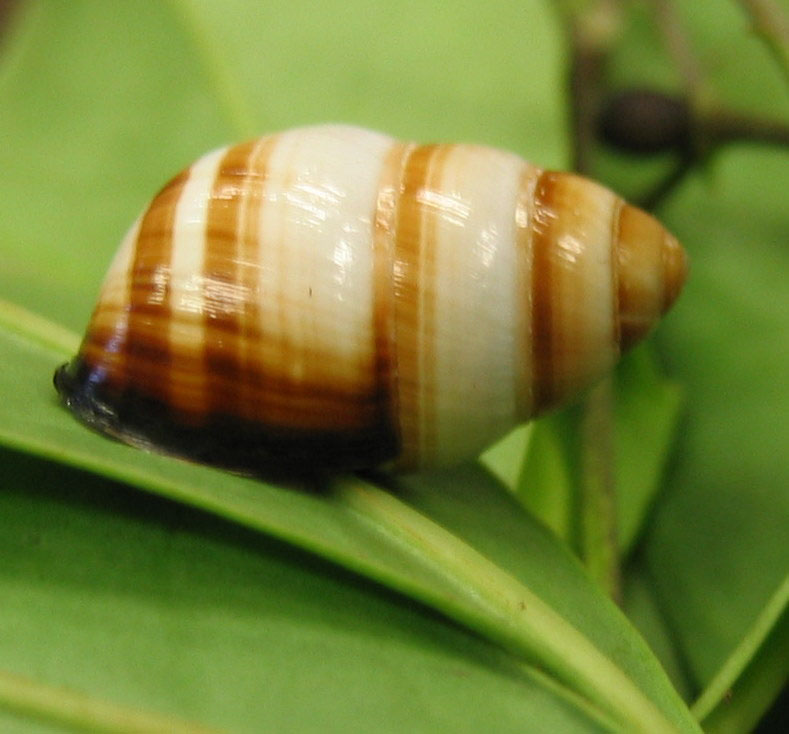
- A live individual of A. bulimoides
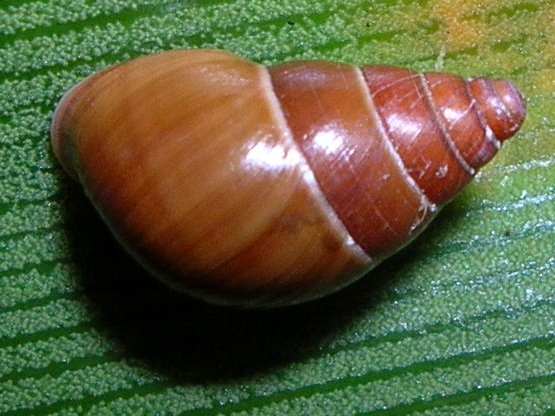
- An unidentified species of Auriculella

Scientific classification
- Kingdom: Animalia
- Phylum: Mollusca
- Class: Gastropoda
- Order: Stylommatophora
- Superfamily: Pupilloidea; Gulick, 1873
- Family: Achatinellidae; Gulick, 1873

= Achatinellidae =

Family of gastropods

Achatinellidae is a family of tropical air-breathing land snails, terrestrial pulmonate gastropod mollusks in the superfamily Pupilloidea.

== Taxonomy ==
It was previously the only family in the superfamily Achatinelloidea (according to the taxonomy of the Gastropoda by Bouchet & Rocroi, 2005). It is now classified under the superfamily Pupilloidea.

The family Achatinellidae represents a diverse adaptive radiation. All species of tree-snail in Hawaii are believed to have come from a single ancestral snail. How that ancestral snail made the 3,800-kilometre (2,400 mi) trip across the ocean is unknown. A longstanding theory is that a bird carried a notably smaller ancestor across the ocean and dropped it on the islands, as bird mediated dispersal has been documented in other snail species. Alternative theories include that it floating across the ocean on a mat of debris, or that it island hopped across the Pacific in a combination of the theories.

Subfamilies in the family Achatinellidae include:

- Achatinellinae Gulick, 1873 - synonym: Helicterinae Pease, 1870 (inv.)
- Auriculellinae Odhner, 1921
- Elasmatininae Iredale, 1937
  - tribe Elasmatinini Iredale, 1937 - synonyms: Strobilidae Zilch, 1959 (n.a.); Pitysinae Cooke & Kondo, 1961
  - tribe Antonellini Cooke & Kondo, 1961
  - tribe Tubuaiini Cooke & Kondo, 1961
- Pacificellinae Steenberg, 1925
  - tribe Pacificellini Steenberg, 1925 - synonym: Tornatellinoptini Cooke & Kondo, 1961
  - tribe Lamellideini Cooke & Kondo, 1961
- Tekoulininae Solem, 1972
- Tornatellidinae Cooke & Kondo, 1961
  - tribe Tornatellidini Cooke & Kondo, 1961
  - tribe Tornatellariini Cooke & Kondo, 1961
- Tornatellininae Sykes, 1900
  - tribe Tornatellinini Sykes, 1900
  - tribe Elasmiatini Kuroda & Habe, 1949

== Anatomy ==
In this family, the number of haploid chromosomes lies between 16 and 25 (according to the values in the table).

== Distribution ==
This family of snails occurs widely in the Pacific islands. They are at their most diverse in the Hawaiian group.

== Genera ==
Genera in the family Achatinellidae include:

Achatinellinae

- Achatinella Swainson, 1828 - type genus of the subfamily Achatinellinae
- Partulina Pfeiffer, 1854
- Perdicella Pease, 1870
- Newcombia Pfeiffer, 1854

Auriculellinae

- Auriculella Pfeiffer, 1854 - type genus of the subfamily Auriculellinae

Elasmatininae

- tribe Elasmatinini
- tribe Antonellini
- tribe Tubuaiini
  - Tubuaia

Pacificellinae

- tribe Pacificellini
  - Tornatellinops Pilsbry & Cooke, 1915
- tribe Lamellideini
  - Lamellidea Pilsbry, 1910

Tekoulininae

  - Tekoulina Solem, 1972

Tornatellidinae

- tribe Tornatellidini
  - Tornatellides Pilsbry, 1910 - type genus of the tribe Tornatellidini
- tribe Tornatellariini
  - Tornatellaria Pilsbry, 1910 - type genus of the tribe Tornatellariini

Tornatellininae

- tribe Tornatellinini
  - Tornatellina L. Pfeiffer, 1842 - type genus the tribe Tornatellinini
- tribe Elasmiatini
  - Elasmias Pilsbry, 1910 - type genus of the tribe Elasmiatini

unsorted

- Gulickia Cooke, 1915
- † Hotumatua Kirch, Christensen & Steadman, 2009 - Hotumatua anakenana Kirch, Christensen & Steadman, 2009
- Tornatellinops Pilsbry, 1915
- Tornelasmias Iredale, 1944
