= List of European species extinct in the Holocene =

Map of Europe

This is a list of European species extinct in the Holocene that covers extinctions from the Holocene epoch, a geologic epoch that began about 11,650 years before present (about 9700 BCE) (Note: The source gives "11,700 calendar yr b2k (before CE 2000)". But "BP" means "before CE 1950". Therefore, the Holocene began 11,650 BP. Doing the math, that is c. 9700 BCE.) and continues to the present day.

This list includes the European continent and its surrounding islands. All large islands in the Mediterranean Sea are included except for Cyprus, which is in the List of Asian species extinct in the Holocene. The recently extinct species of the Macaronesian islands in the North Atlantic are listed separately. The three Caucasian republics of Georgia, Azerbaijan, and Armenia are included, even though their territory may fall partially or fully in Asia depending on the definition of Europe considered.

Overseas territories, departments, and constituent countries of European countries are not included here; they are found on the lists pertaining to their respective regions. For example, French Polynesia is grouped with Oceania, Martinique is grouped with the West Indies, and Réunion is grouped with Madagascar and the Indian Ocean islands, despite all of them being politically part of France.

Many extinction dates are unknown due to a lack of relevant information.

== Mammals (class Mammalia) ==
=== Elephant-like mammals (order Proboscidea) ===
==== Elephants and mammoths (family Elephantidae) ====
Common name	Scientific name	Range	Comments	Pictures
Woolly mammoth	Mammuthus primigenius	Northern Eurasia and North America	Most recent remains in the Southern Urals dated to 9650 BCE, and in Cherepovets, Russia to 9290-9180 BCE.	
Tilos dwarf elephant	Palaeoloxodon tiliensis	Tilos, Greece	Most recent remains dated to 3040-1840 BCE, but this dating is regarded as tentative.	

=== Lagomorphs (order Lagomorpha) ===
==== Rabbits and hares (family Leporidae) ====
Common name	Scientific name	Range	Comments
Don hare	Lepus timidus tanaiticus	Russia	Gradually replaced by the extant mountain hare south to north until becoming extinct during the Subboreal, 3050-550 BCE.

==== Pikas (family Ochotonidae) ====
Common name	Scientific name	Range	Comments	Pictures
	Ochotona transcaucasica	Georgia and Azerbaijan	Similar to the Afghan pika. It probably became extinct in the early Holocene.	
Sardinian pika	Prolagus sardus	Corsica and Sardinia	Most recent remains dated to 348 BCE - 283 CE. Though hunted by the original human inhabitants of the islands, it likely became extinct due to Roman agricultural practices, the introduction of predators (dogs, cats, and small mustelids) and ecological competitors (rodents, rabbits, and hares). Transmission of pathogens by rabbits and hares could have been another factor. Survival into modern history, even as late as 1774 on the smaller island of Tavolara, has been hypothesised from the description of unknown mammals by later Sardinian authors; however, this interpretation remains dubious owing to anatomical discrepancies.	

===== Locally extinct =====
Common name	Scientific name	Range	Comments	Pictures
Steppe pika	Ochotona pusilla	Western Europe to Kazakhstan	Most recent remains dated to 9650 BCE in the Ponto-Caspian region, 9550 BCE in Boreal Europe, 9450 BCE in the British Isles, 8850 BCE in Northwestern Germany, 8750 BCE in northern Central Europe, 6050 BCE in the Carpathian Basin, the Middle Holocene in the Middle Urals, and 1220 BCE in the Southern Urals. This species avoids human disturbance strictly and is considered an excellent indicator of the health of steppe ecosystems, as a result.	

=== Rodents (order Rodentia) ===
==== Hamsters, voles, lemmings, muskrats, and New World rats and mice (family Cricetidae) ====
Common name	Scientific name	Range	Comments
Armathia hamster	Mesocricetus rathgeberi	Armathia, Greece	Known from subfossil remains associated with anthropogenically introduced mammalian species, such as black rats, house mice, and rabbits. It was a large species comparable to the Ciscaucasian hamster, but believed to have acquired its size by convergent evolution. Nevertheless, its endemism has been questioned, raising the possibility that it was introduced to the island by humans.
	Microtus brecciensis	Iberian Peninsula	Most recent remains dated to 8450 BCE.
Maltese vole	Microtus melitensis	Malta	Known from the Pleistocene, but might have survived into the Holocene due to humans arriving in the islands later.
	Pliomys coronensis	Western Europe	Most recent remains in Green Spain dated to the Holocene.
	Stenocranius anglicus	Europe	Closely related to the living narrow-headed vole, but endemic to Europe. Most recent remains dated to 9650 BCE in the Ponto-Caspian Region, 9550 BCE in Boreal Europe, 8750 BCE in northern Central Europe, 8250 BCE in the Franco-Cantabrian region, 6050 BCE in Northwestern Germany, 5850 BCE in the Carpathian Basin, and Late Holocene in the Urals.
Tyrrhenian vole	Tyrrhenicola henseli	Corsica and Sardinia	Most recent remains dated to 348 BCE - 283 CE.

==== Old World rats and mice (family Muridae) ====
Common name	Scientific name	Range	Comments	Pictures
	Apodemus sp.	Naxos, Greece	Known from the Pleistocene, but might have survived into the Holocene due to humans not arriving to the island until later.	
	Meriones malatestae	Lampedusa, Italy	Known from the Pleistocene, but might have survived into the Holocene due to humans not arriving to the island until later.	
	Mus minotaurus	Crete, Greece	Most recent remains at Mochlos dated to the Bronze Age. It was outcompeted and replaced by the house mouse accidentally introduced by sailors from the eastern Mediterranean.	
St. Kilda house mouse	Mus musculus muralis	St Kilda, Scotland	A commensal species, it became extinct after the removal of all human inhabitants from the island in 1930.	
Tyrrhenian field rat	Rhagamys orthodon	Corsica and Sardinia	Most recent remains dated to 348 BCE - 283 CE.	

==== Dormice (family Gliridae) ====
Common name	Scientific name	Range	Comments	Pictures
Majorcan giant dormouse	Hypnomys morpheus	Gymnesian Islands, Spain	Most recent remains at Escorca, Mallorca dated to 4840-4690 BCE, coinciding with the period of initial human settlement in the island. It could have succumbed to diseases carried by introduced commensal mammals.	
Maltese giant dormouse	Maltamys wiedincitensis	Sicily and Malta	Known from the Pleistocene, but possibly reached the Holocene in Malta due to humans arriving there later.	

==== Squirrels (family Sciuridae) ====
Common name	Scientific name	Range	Comments	Pictures
Pannonian souslik	Spermophilus citelloides	Central Europe to Dobruja	Most recent remains dated to the early Holocene.	
	Spermophilus severskensis	Desna River region	Highly specialised for grazing, with the narrowest range of all Pleistocene ground quirrels. The latest possible date is the Atlantic, and its extinction was probably related to the local collapse of the mammoth steppe.	
	Spermophilus superciliosus	North Central Europe and the British Isles to Crimea and the Middle Urals	Most recent remains in north Central Europe are dated to 8750 BCE. The species was recorded even later in Ukraine, being found in Mesolithic sites of Crimea and in Holocene levels of Kostianets, on the middle Dnieper River. There is a tentative identification with unidentified "red-cheeked" squirrels recorded in the Dnieper area, the last time at the beginning of the 20th century in Dnipro.	

=== True insectivores (order Eulipotyphla) ===
==== True shrews (family Soricidae) ====
Common name	Scientific name	Range	Comments	Pictures
Sardinian giant shrew	Asoriculus similis	Corsica and Sardinia	Most recent remains dated to 348 BCE - 283 CE. (Note: A. corsicanus was originally applied to remains from Corsica and A. similis to Sardinia. It was later recognized that A. corsicanus existed in the early Pleistocene of both islands, and A. similis in the late Pleistocene-Holocene, as seen in Moncunill-Sole et al. (2016).)	
Balearic giant shrew	Nesiotites hidalgo	Gymnesian Islands, Spain	Most recent remains at Alcúdia dated to 3030-2690 BCE, coinciding with the period of initial human settlement in the island. It could have succumbed to diseases carried by introduced commensal mammals.	Top, compared to Neomys below.

=== Carnivorans (order Carnivora) ===
==== Cats (family Felidae) ====
Common name	Scientific name	Range	Comments	Pictures
Eurasian cave lion	Panthera spelaea	Northern Eurasia and Beringia	Most recent remains at Bois Ragot near Gouex, France dated to 9892-9404. Other lion remains from Italy and northern Spain could indicate that a small form survived in mountain areas until the Preboreal and Boreal, respectively.	

===== Locally extinct =====
Common name	Scientific name	Range	Comments	Pictures
Cheetah	Acinonyx jubatus	Africa, western Asia, and India	Remains were found in Shengavit and Urartu, Armenia dating to the 4th-3rd millennium BCE. It is also depicted in rock art of the 4th-1st millennium BCE, where it can be differentiated from the leopard by the shape of its paws and unretracted claws. Possibly survived in Armenia until the Middle Ages before disappearing due to hunting.	
Lion	Panthera leo	Africa, western Asia, northern India, and southern Europe	According to the alternate hypothesis, the Asiatic lion expanded into southern Europe and replaced the cave lion already in the Late Glacial, surviving in Italy and northern Spain until the Preboreal or Boreal. The most recent remains at Mount Vingiolo, Calabria were dated to 8293-7064 BCE. A possible second colonization event took place in the Balkans during the Atlantic and Subboreal periods, reaching as far as Hungary, southwestern Ukraine, and Greece. The lion declined strongly in Europe during the Iron Age, possibly because of sports hunting and habitat loss caused by increasing human population and livestock rearing. In 370 CE the Greco-Roman orator Themistius mentioned that lions had disappeared from Thessaly, their last Balkan stronghold. (Note: "...and we are displeased because elephants have been removed from Libya, because lions have disappeared from Thessaly, because hippopotamoi have been gotten rid from the marshes of the Nile.") Lions were also hunted across Transcaucasia and were reportedly common in the ungulate-rich Kura-Aras lowland and Mughan plain, up to the Absheron Peninsula, until 900 CE. In Ukraine, the youngest lion remains are 2000 to 2500 years old. A "shaggy" and "fierce beast" mentioned in The Instruction of Vladimir Monomakh (c. 1117), that leaped and injured a rider and his horse, has been interpreted sometimes as a wild lion in the Chernihiv-Turov area during the Middle Ages. However, this observation is well outside the temporal and geographic range of the lion remains in southwestern coastal Ukraine.	
Leopard	Panthera pardus	Tropical and temperate Eurasia and Africa	A cold-adapted subspecies of the leopard, Panthera pardus spelaea, was widespread in Europe during the Pleniglacial and Late Glacial. A 8850 BCE record from the Franco-Cantabrian region, another from the Preboreal or Boreal of Greece, and two from the Sub-Atlantic of western and southern Ukraine could indicate that leopards survived or recolonized the continent in the Holocene. However, later remains from Hellenistic and Roman sites are attributed to importation from Asia and Africa. In the Caucasus, the leopard was hunted to extinction from most of the region by the 1950s or 1960s, but still survives in small areas of the North Caucasus, southern Armenia, and Azerbaijan. These leopards belong to the Persian subspecies Panthera pardus tulliana, which also occurs in Anatolia. An Anatolian leopard was killed in the Greek island of Samos after swimming from Asia in 1889. Local folklore suggests that similar events have happened in the island at different times in history.	
Tiger	Panthera tigris	Tropical and temperate Asia to the Black Sea	Present permanently in the Caucasus region and along the Caspian and eastern Azov coasts, the Terek and Kuban rivers, and the estuary of the Don river during the 10th-12th centuries CE. Vladimir Monomakh's "fierce beast" has been interpreted sometimes as a vagrant tiger, but tigers are absent from Medieval Slavic art and folklore, unlike lions. Tigers were last recorded in Mingrelia and Imeretia at the beginning of the 17th century, Armenia in the early 19th century, eastern Georgia in 1936, and Azerbaijan's Talysh Mountains in 1966. The last three were all vagrants intruding after tigers stopped breeding in the respective area.	

==== Hyenas (family Hyaenidae) ====
Common name	Scientific name	Range	Comments	Pictures
Cave hyena	Crocuta spelaea	Europe, Central Asia, and the Middle East	Most recent remains dated to 9650 BCE in the Franco-Cantabrian region and to 8950 BCE in the British Isles. Coprolites last dated in Cueva de las Ventanas, Granada, Spain to 5030 BCE.	

==== Dogs (family Canidae) ====
Common name	Scientific name	Range	Comments	Pictures
Sicilian wolf	Canis lupus cristaldii	Sicily, Italy	Exterminated by livestock farmers. The last confirmed individual was killed in 1924 near Bellolampo; unconfirmed killings near Palermo were reported between 1935 and 1938, and unconfirmed sightings between 1960 and 1970.	
European dhole	Cuon alpinus europaeus	Central, Southern Europe and the Caucasus	Most recent remains dated to 7050-6550 BCE in Riparo Fredian, Italy (with doubts) and Les Coves de Santa Maira, Spain. Claims of 21st century presence of dhole in the Caucasus are erroneous.	
Sardinian dhole	Cynotherium sardous	Corsica and Sardinia	Most recent remains in Corsica dated to 9910-9710 BCE and Sardinia to 9531-9196 BCE, roughly coinciding with modern human colonization of the islands.	

==== Martens, polecats, otters, badgers, and weasels (family Mustelidae) ====
Common name	Scientific name	Range	Comments	Pictures
Sardinian giant otter	Megalenhydris barbaricina	Sardinia, Italy	Known from a single skeleton found in a cave with no stratigraphical context but estimated to be Late Pleistocene or early Holocene, 68050-8050 BCE.	

=== Odd-toed ungulates (order Perissodactyla) ===
==== Horses, asses, and zebras (family Equidae) ====
Common name	Scientific name	Range	Comments	Pictures
Tarpan	Equus ferus ferus	Western Europe to western Siberia, Anatolia?	Historical sources record wild horses living until the 12th century in Denmark, 13th in Germany, 14th in Portugal, 16th in Spain (zebros), the Vosges, East Prussia, and Lithuania; 18th in the northern Carpathians and southern Urals, and 19th in Poland and Ukraine. The last in the wild was killed in Askania-Nova in 1879, and the last in captivity died in Russia in 1918. Some historical sources treat them as wild, untameable animals of different nature to horses, and others as feral horses or hybrids, placing the moment when pure wild horses became extinct in the continent in doubt. In spite of this, the IUCN considers the subspecies E. f. ferus valid. The Tatar-Cossack name "tarpan" was popularized for European wild horses in the 19th century, though today is sometimes limited to horses from central and eastern Europe. Paleogenomics suggest that horses were domesticated independently in the Ponto-Caspian steppe and expanded to the rest of Europe by the Bronze Age. Early nomadic pastoralists likely released their horses to graze freely at night, resulting in feral populations and hybridization with wild horses. Wild mares were also captured to replenish domestic herds, breaking down the social order of wild herds and diminishing their reproduction. Around 600-1100 CE, the original high genetic diversity of domestic horses dropped to current levels. In historical times European wild horses were hunted for their meat, hide, traditional medicine, sport, and to protect crops and livestock hay deposits during the winter. Several horse breeds have been claimed to have recent tarpan ancestry including the Dülmener, Konik, Sorraia, Exmoor pony, Hucul pony, Bosnian Mountain Horse, Estonian Native, and Gotland pony. However, genetic and historical evidence indicate that all are typical domestic horses.	Tarpan drawn by Charles Hamilton Smith from eyewitness testimonies (1841). A claimed 1884 photograph of a tarpan hybrid in captivity (Lovász et al., 2021).
Hydruntine	Equus hemionus hydruntinus	Southern Europe to northern Iran	Remains dated to 8050 BCE in Western Europe, 3550 BCE in Italy, 3300-2700 BCE in Karanovo, Bulgaria; 3200-2500 BCE in Los Millares, Spain; 2050 BCE in southern Central Europe, and 1500-500 BCE in Keti, Armenia. Questionable remains in Didi-gora, Georgia dated to 1075 BCE. The hydruntine inhabited open steppe habitat that became rarer and fragmented in the Holocene, making it more vulnerable to human exploitation.	

===== Locally extinct =====
Common name	Scientific name	Range	Comments	Pictures
Turkmenian kulan	Equus hemionus kulan	Ukraine to Central Asia	Probably present in the deserts between the Volga and Ural rivers until the 18th or 19th century, when it was extirpated due to increasing hunting with firearms and seizure of waterholes for livestock use. 18th century records from Voronezh, Russia are considered unreliable. It was first reintroduced to Askania-Nova, Ukraine in 1950. In 2020 Rewilding Europe released kulan in the Tarutyns'kyj steppe near the Danube Delta. It has also announced plans to release kulan in Spain as proxy for the hydruntine.	
Persian onager	Equus hemionus onager	Iran and the eastern Caucasus	Most recent remains at the Baku fortress dated to the 13th century.	

==== Rhinoceroses (family Rhinocerotidae) ====
Common name	Scientific name	Range	Comments	Pictures
Woolly rhinoceros	Coelodonta antiquitatis	Northern Eurasia	Most recent remains in the Southern Urals dated to 9450 BCE.	

=== Even-toed ungulates (order Artiodactyla) ===
==== Right and bowhead whales (family Balaenidae) ====
===== Locally extinct =====
Common name	Scientific name	Range	Comments	Pictures
North Atlantic right whale	Eubalaena glacialis	North Atlantic and western Mediterranean Sea	Possibly calved in the Mediterranean in ancient times. All few confirmed individuals in Europe since 1999 were identified as vagrants from the North American population, and known calving areas in Africa appear to be depleted. This slow-moving species was the most common target for European whaling ships historically.	

==== Gray whales (family Eschrichtiidae) ====
===== Locally extinct =====
Common name	Scientific name	Range	Comments	Pictures
Gray whale	Eschrichtius robustus	North Atlantic, Mediterranean, and northern Pacific Ocean	Commonly targeted by whalers in ancient and medieval times. The most recent remains at Cudillero, Spain were directly dated to 1036-1291, and remains from Bornais, Scotland were dated indirectly through their archaeological context, to 1200–1450. A vagrant from the Pacific population dispersed over the Arctic Ocean and was seen in Europe in 2010.	

==== True deer (family Cervidae) ====
Common name	Scientific name	Range	Comments	Pictures
Caucasian moose	Alces alces caucasicus	North Caucasus and the Transcaucasian coast of the Black Sea	Hunted to extinction by the beginning of the 20th century. The subspecies' validity is questioned because moose from Russia later colonized the North Caucasus naturally over the 20th century.	
Irish elk (giant deer)	Megaloceros giganteus	Europe and Southern Siberia	Most recent remains in Maloarkhangelsk, Russia dated to 5766-5643 BCE, and in the South Urals dated to 2320 BCE. Alleged Holocene remains from Great Britain, Ireland, Schleswig-Holstein, and Ukraine are poorly dated or erroneous. Scythian engravings from 600-500 BCE that appear to depict Megaloceros could have been based on fossil remains.	
	Praemegaceros cazioti	Corsica and Sardinia	Most recently dated to 8718 BCE in Teppa u Lupinu, Corsica and 5641–5075 BCE in Grotta Juntu, Sardinia. It survived the first human colonization of the islands, but became extinct when Neolithic peoples arrived.	

===== Locally extinct =====
Common name	Scientific name	Range	Comments	Pictures
Wapiti	Cervus canadensis	Northern Eurasia and North America	Survived into the early Holocene of Scania and (as the subspecies C. c. palmidactyloceros) in northern Italy, Switzerland, and possibly the French Alps while the temperate forest-adapted red deer replaced it in the rest of Europe. The dwarf subspecies C. c. tyrrhenicus existed in Capri after the post-glacial sea level rise.	

==== Cattle, goats, antelopes, and others (family Bovidae) ====
Common name	Scientific name	Range	Comments	Pictures
Caucasian wisent	Bison bonasus caucasicus	Caucasus, Kurdistan, and possibly northern Iran	Declined after the Russian conquest of the Caucasus as a result of increased hunting, deforestation, and domestic cattle rearing. The subspecies was protected in the 1890s when it was limited to 442 animals in the area between the Belaya and Laba rivers. However an epizootic outbreak in 1919 reduced the animals to just 50, and the last individuals were poached in 1927. The only captive animal, a male, lived in Germany between 1908 and 1925 and bred with females of the lowland wisent subspecies. As a result, several wisent populations carry its genes today.	
Carpathian wisent	Bison bonasus hungarorum	Carpathian Mountains	Claimed subspecies disappeared in either 1762 or 1790, but there is a lack of differences to justify it. It was described from a single neurocranium in the Hungarian National Museum that was subsequently lost in the Hungarian Revolution of 1956.	
Steppe bison	Bison priscus	Northern Eurasia and North America	Most recent remains dated to 1130-1060 BCE near the Oyat river in Western Russia. However this date was not calibrated and the remains could be older. Recent calibrated dates include 9450 BCE in the Southern Urals, 8650 BCE in the Middle Urals, and 7550 BCE in Boreal Europe.	
Eurasian aurochs	Bos primigenius primigenius	Europe and Western Asia	Declined as a result of hunting, deforestation for agriculture, competition with livestock for pastures, and diseases transmitted by domestic cattle. The last individual in the Jaktorow forest of Mazovia, Poland died in 1627, and the last in Sofia, Bulgaria in the late 17th or early 18th century. There are different active projects to breed aurochs-like cattle and release them in the wild as proxy for the aurochs.	
European water buffalo	Bubalus murrensis	Central, eastern, and southeastern Europe	Most recent confirmed remains in Kolomna, Russia dated to 10811 BCE, during the Last Glacial Period. However, unique genetic introgression into European domestic water buffaloes and possible remains from the Neolithic of southeastern Europe (9000-7000 BCE) and Atlantic of Austria (7000-4000 BCE) suggest that the native European species of water buffalo survived into the Holocene. In 2019, Rewilding Europe released domestic buffaloes in the Danube Delta as proxy for the European water buffalo.	
Portuguese ibex	Capra pyrenaica lusitanica	Portuguese-Galician border	Hunted to extinction around 1890. A different subspecies of Spanish ibex naturally colonized the Peneda-Gerês National Park in the Portuguese ibex's former range during the 21st century.	
Pyrenean ibex	Capra pyrenaica pyrenaica	Pyrenees and possibly the Cantabrian Mountains	The last individual, a female, died at Ordesa National Park in 2000. A single cloned individual was born on July 30, 2003, but died several minutes later, making this the first case of animal taxon de-extinction as well as a taxon becoming extinct twice. In 2014, Spanish ibexes from the Guadarrama Mountains were released in the French Pyrenees as proxy for the Pyrenean ibex.	
Cèdres tahr	Hemitragus cedrensis	Eastern Spain to Provence	Most recent remains in the Iberian Peninsula dated to 9600 BCE.	
Balearic Islands cave goat	Myotragus balearicus	Gymnesian Islands, Spain	Most recent remains dated to 3969-3759 BCE in Menorca, 3649-3379 BCE in Cabrera, and 2830-2470 BCE in Mallorca. The timeframe allows to confidently exclude climate change as a reason for the extinction and blame it solely on the first human settlers to the islands.	

===== Extinct in the wild =====
Common name	Scientific name	Range	Comments	Pictures
Lowland wisent	Bison bonasus bonasus	Western Europe to Southern Siberia	The last wild population in Poland's Białowieża Forest was hunted to extinction during World War I. A captive herd was returned to Bialowieza in 1929; it was made of zoo animals, some of which were hybridized with other subspecies or species of bison. Individuals with American bison ancestry were removed from Bialowieza in 1936, and with Caucasian wisent ancestry in 1950. The Bialowieza herd was fully returned to the wild in 1952 and subsequently used as stock for pure lowland herds in Poland, Lithuania, and Belarus. The Caucasian-lowland hybrid line was introduced to the Kavkazsky Nature Reserve in 1940, in the Caucasian wisent's former range, and allowed to roam free from 1946. Other hybrid wisent herds were later established in the Carpathians, Ukraine, and Russia.	

===== Locally extinct =====
Common name	Scientific name	Range	Comments	Pictures
Wild water buffalo	Bubalus arnee	Southern Asia	Most recent remains at Kosi Choter, Armenia dated to the Bronze Age.	
Muskox	Ovibos moschatus	Northern Eurasia and North America	Most recent remains in Sweden were dated to 7050 BCE. The first reintroduction attempt was made at Gurskøya, Norway in 1925, but all animals died because of the unfavorable climate or poaching. Another herd was released at Hjerkinn in the Dovrefjell mountains in Dovre Municipality in 1932. These animals are presumed to have been exterminated during World War II, though there were unconfirmed sightings of muskoxen at Tafjord in 1942 and 1951. The definitive successful reintroduction in Dovre was made in 1947. In 1971 a herd left Dovre after being harassed by tourists and established itself in Harjedalen, Sweden. Norwegians also introduced muskoxen to Svalbard in 1929, outside of the muskox's natural range, but this population died out by the 1970s.	

== Birds (class Aves) ==
=== Rails and cranes (order Gruiformes) ===
==== Rails (family Rallidae) ====
Common name	Scientific name	Range	Comments
Ibiza rail	Rallus eivissensis	Ibiza, Spain	Most recent remains dated to 5295-4848 BCE.

=== Shorebirds (order Charadriiformes) ===
==== Sandpipers (family Scolopacidae) ====
Common name	Scientific name	Range	Comments	Pictures
Slender-billed curlew	Numenius tenuirostris	Western Eurasia and North Africa	The species bred in Kazakhstan and southern Siberia and wintered in western Morocco and Tunisia, being present in Europe during migration or as a vagrant. It likely disappeared as a result of habitat alteration in Asia and overhunting in Africa. The last confirmed record worldwide was in Hungary, in 2001.	

==== Auks (family Alcidae) ====
Common name	Scientific name	Range	Comments	Pictures
Great auk	Pinguinus impennis	Northern Atlantic and western Mediterranean Sea	Originally hunted for its feathers, meat, fat, and oil; as it grew rare, also to supply collectionists. The last pair on the eastern Atlantic was killed on Eldey Island, off Iceland in 1844.	

==== Buttonquails (family Turnicidae) ====
===== Locally extinct =====
Common name	Scientific name	Range	Comments	Pictures
Common buttonquail	Turnix sylvaticus	Africa, South Asia, southwestern Iberian Peninsula, and Sicily	Last confirmed individual in Spain was killed in Doñana National Park in 1981.	

=== Pelicans, herons, and ibises (order Pelecaniformes) ===
==== Ibises and spoonbills (family Threskiornithidae) ====
===== Locally extinct =====
Common name	Scientific name	Range	Comments	Pictures
Northern bald ibis	Geronticus eremita	Mediterranean region	Extirpated from Europe before 1650 as a result of habitat loss, climate change, and direct persecution. A 1738 painting made in England by Eleazar Albin was based on a stuffed specimen or an older depiction. In 1991 a gradual reintroduction project using handreared chicks began at Alpenzoo Innsbruck in Austria, and in 2011 a migratory population was established between southern Germany, Austria, and Tuscany. A second reintroduction project started in southern Spain in 2004.	

=== Hawks and relatives (order Accipitriformes) ===
==== Hawks, eagles, kites, harriers and Old World vultures (family Accipitridae) ====
Scientific name	Range	Comments
Aquila nipaloides	Corsica and Sardinia	Similar to the steppe eagle. Most recent remains at Teppa di U Lupinu, Corsica dated to 8718-8300 BCE.

=== Owls (order Strigiformes) ===
==== True owls (family Strigidae) ====
Common name	Scientific name	Range	Comments
Mediterranean brown fish owl	Ketupa zeylonensis lamarmorae	Corsica, Sardinia, southern Italy, Crete, and Israel	Described as different separated species including Bubo insularis, before being recognized as a subspecies of the Asian brown fish owl. The most recent remains in Corsica date to 7433-7035 BCE. In Corsica-Sardinia it could have been locally adapted to prey on the Sardinian pika, disappearing after human arrival with it.

===== Locally extinct =====
Common name	Scientific name	Range	Comments	Images
Marsh owl	Asio capensis	Africa and southwestern Iberia	Occasional winter visitor to southwest Andalusia until the end of the 19th century, with a single later record of a bird shot in Jerez de la Frontera in 1998.	

=== Perching birds (order Passeriformes) ===
==== Crows and relatives (family Corvidae) ====
Common name	Scientific name	Range	Comments	Pictures
Pied raven	Corvus corax varius morpha leucophaeus	Faroe Islands	Last confirmed individual shot in Mykines in 1902.	

== Reptiles (class Reptilia) ==
=== Squamates (order Squamata) ===
==== Wall lizards (family Lacertidae) ====
Common name	Scientific name	Range	Comments	Pictures
Ratas Island lizard	Podarcis lilfordi rodriquezi	Ratas Island off Mahón, Spain	Exterminated in 1935 when the island was exploded as part of remodeling works in Mahón harbor.	
Santo Stefano lizard	Podarcis siculus sanctistephani	Santo Stefano Island, Italy	Extinct around 1965 as a result of an epidemic and predation by introduced snakes and feral cats.	

==== Vipers (family Viperidae) ====
Common name	Scientific name	Range	Comments
Ibizan dwarf viper	Vipera latastei ebusitana	Ibiza, Spain	Most recent remains dated to 5295 BCE. The causes of extinction are presumed human-induced due to the lack of climatic changes at the time, such as the introduction of exotic predators like feral dogs, pigs, and garden dormice by the first human settlers.

===== Locally extinct =====
Common name	Scientific name	Range	Comments
Columbretes Islands viper	Population of Vipera latastei	Columbretes Islands, Spain	Only modern island population of V. latastei, deliberately exterminated during the construction of a lighthouse in 1856-1859.

== Ray-finned fish (class Actinopterygii) ==
=== Sturgeons and paddlefishes (order Acipenseriformes) ===
==== Sturgeons (family Acipenseridae) ====
===== Locally extinct =====
Common name	Scientific name	Range	Comments	Pictures
Atlantic sturgeon	Acipenser oxyrinchus oxyrinchus	Eastern coast of North America and the Baltic region	Last known Baltic specimen was caught in 1996 near Muhumaa, Estonia. It was reintroduced to the Oder river in 2009, and to the Narva in 2013.	

=== Carps, barbs, minnows, and allies (order Cypriniformes) ===
==== Carps, barbs, and barbels (family Cyprinidae) ====
Common name	Scientific name	Range	Comments
Skadar nase	Chondrostoma scodrense	Lake Skadar	Described in 1987 from specimens preserved in the 1900s. Surveys of the lake failed to find any living animals.

==== True minnows (family Leuciscidae) ====
Common name	Scientific name	Range	Comments
Bogardilla	Squalius palaciosi	Jándula and Rumblar rivers, Andalusia, Spain	Last recorded in 1999. Probably extinct due to damming since the 1930s, introduction of exotic fish and crustaceans, and pollution from agriculture and mining.

=== Salmon, trout and relatives (order Salmoniformes) ===
==== Salmon, trout and relatives (family Salmonidae) ====
Common name	Scientific name	Range	Comments	Pictures
Savoy whitefish	Coregonus bezola	Lac du Bourget, France	Last recorded in the 1960s. Disappeared due to eutrophication of the lake caused by pollution.	
True fera	Coregonus fera	Lake Geneva	Last recorded in 1920. Became extinct due to eutrophication and overfishing.	
Lake Constance whitefish	Coregonus gutturosus	Lake Constance	Not recorded since eutrophication of the lake peaked in the early 1970s, killing all eggs.	
Gravenche	Coregonus hiemalis	Lake Geneva	Not recorded since the early 1900s. Likely disappeared due to eutrophication and overfishing.	
	Coregonus restrictus	Lake Morat, Switzerland	Last recorded in 1890, likely because of eutrophication.	
	Salvelinus neocomensis	Lake Neuchâtel, Switzerland	Last recorded in 1904.	

===== Extinct in the wild =====
Common name	Scientific name	Range	Comments	Pictures
Beloribitsa	Stenodus leucichthys	Caspian Sea, Volga, Ural and Terek river drainages	Last recorded in the Ural in the 1960s. All spawning grounds were lost after dams were built in the Volga, Ural, and Terek river drainages. The species continues to exist in captivity, from which it is released periodically in its native range. However, illegal fishing and hybridization with the introduced nelma remain threats to its survival.	

===== Locally extinct =====
Common name	Scientific name	Range	Comments	Pictures
Houting	Coregonus oxyrinchus	Southern North Sea, Scheldt, Meuse and Rhine Basins up to Cologne, and southeastern England	Disappeared around 1940 as a result of water pollution. Though treated as a different species since about 1700, a genetic study in 2023 found the houting indistinguishable from the lavaret (Coregonus lavaretus) still extant in Great Britain, the Alpine area, and waterways it was introduced to.	

=== Lionfishes and sculpins (order Scorpaeniformes) ===
==== Sticklebacks (family Gasterosteidae) ====
Common name	Scientific name	Range	Comments
Techirghiol stickleback	Gasterosteus crenobiontus	Lake Techirghiol, Romania	Last recorded in the 1960s. Extinct as a result of hybridization with the three-spined stickleback; the springs it inhabited were separated from the latter's habitat by a hypersaline lake acting as barrier between the species, until irrigation works transformed the lake into a brackish one that was invaded by migratory three-spined sticklebacks.

== Cartilaginous fish (class Chondrichthyes) ==
=== Shovelnose rays and allies (order Rhinopristiformes) ===
==== Sawfishes (family Pristidae) ====
===== Locally extinct =====
Common name	Scientific name	Range	Comments	Pictures
Smalltooth sawfish	Pristis pectinata	Mid-Atlantic Ocean and Mediterranean Sea	Last caught in Vis, Croatia in 1902, and broadly in the Mediterranean before 1956.	
Largetooth sawfish	Pristis pristis	Circumtropical	Last caught in Embiez, France before 1966.	

== Lampreys and relatives (class Hyperoartia) ==
=== Lampreys (order Petromyzontiformes) ===
==== Northern lampreys (family Petromyzontidae) ====
Common name	Scientific name	Range	Comments
Ukrainian migratory lamprey	Eudontomyzon sp. nov. 'migratory'	Dniestr, Dniepr, and Don River drainages	Disappeared in the late 19th century for unknown reasons.

== Insects (class Insecta) ==
=== Praying mantises (order Mantodea) ===
==== Family Amelidae ====
Common name	Scientific name	Range	Comments
Spined dwarf mantis	Ameles fasciipennis	Probably near Tolentino, Italy	Known only from the holotype, probably collected around 1871.
	Pseudoyersinia brevipennis	Hyères, France	Only known from the holotype collected in 1860.

=== Bark lice, book lice and parasitic lice (order Psocodea) ===
==== Mammal lice (family Trichodectidae) ====
===== Possibly extinct =====
Common name	Scientific name	Range	Comments
Iberian lynx louse	Felicola isidoroi	Andújar, Spain	Only known from a male adult and a nymph found on a dead Iberian lynx in 1997, itself a critically endangered species with low population density and disjunct distribution at the time. Besides difficulties in mixing and exchanging populations, the lice was threatened by the fact that lynxes taken to captive breeding centers were systematically deloused.

=== Beetles (order Coleoptera) ===
==== Predaceous diving beetles (family Dytiscidae) ====
Common name	Scientific name	Range
Perrin's cave beetle	Siettitia balsetensis	France

=== Butterflies and moths (order Lepidoptera) ===
==== Metalmark butterflies (family Riodinidae) ====
Common name	Scientific name	Range	Comments	Pictures
British large copper	Lycaena dispar dispar	England	Last recorded in 1864.	
Moss-land silver-studded blue	Plebejus argus masseyi	Lancashire and Cumbria, England	Last recorded in 1942.	
Dutch alcon blue	Phengaris alcon arenaria	Utrecht and Holland, Netherlands	Last recorded in 1980.	
British large blue	Phengaris arion eutyphron	Southern Britain	Last recorded in 1979. The subspecies P. a. arion was later introduced from Sweden to replace it.	

==== Cosmet moths (family Cosmopterigidae) ====
Common name	Scientific name	Range	Comments	Pictures
Manchester moth	Euclemensia woodiella	Kersal Moor, England	Last recorded in the 1820s. Only three museum specimens remain.	

=== Caddisflies (order Trichoptera) ===
==== Net-spinning caddisflies (family Hydropsychidae) ====
Common name	Scientific name	Range	Comments
Tobias' caddisfly	Hydropsyche tobiasi	The Main River and the Rhine up to Cologne, Germany	Last collected in 1938. Both the Main and the Rhine were heavily polluted around that time and all local caddisfly species disappeared. Although other caddisflies returned after water quality improved, this species has not been recorded since.

=== Flies and mosquitos (order Diptera) ===
==== Long-legged flies (family Dolichopodidae) ====
Scientific name	Range	Comments
Poecilobothrus majesticus	Walton-on-the-Naze, Essex, England	Last recorded in 1907. The causes of extinction are unknown.

== Slugs and snails (class Gastropoda) ==
=== Order Littorinimorpha ===
==== Mud snails (family Hydrobiidae) ====
Scientific name	Range	Comments	Pictures
Graecoanatolica macedonica	Doiran Lake on the Greece-North Macedonia border	Last recorded before the peak water substraction in the lake in 1988. However, fresh shells collected in 2009 may hint to its continued survival.	
Ohridohauffenia drimica	Upper Drin River in North Macedonia	Last recorded before 1983. Disappeared when the river was drained.	

===== Possibly extinct =====
Scientific name	Range	Comments
Belgrandia varica	Var River Delta, France	Not seen since 1870. The documented area of distribution was greatly urbanized, degraded, and polluted afterward.
Belgrandiella boetersi	Tiefsteinschlucht, Austria	Not seen in surveys since at least 1968. It likely declined due to groundwater abstraction and habitat degradation.

=== Order Stylommatophora ===
==== True glass snails (family Zonitidae) ====
Scientific name	Range	Comments
Zonites santoriniensis	Santorini, Greece	Wiped out by the Minoan eruption.
Zonites siphnicus	Sifnos, Sikinos, and Folegandros, Greece	Only known from subfossil remains collected in 1933-1935.

===== Possibly extinct =====
Scientific name	Range	Comments
Zonites embolium	Islets of Dyo Adelfoi, Megali Zafrano, Karavonisi, and Divounia, inbetween Astypalaia and Karpathos, Greece	Known only from subfossil shells in three islets and last recorded in the fourth in 1985. Likely declined due to habitat alteration caused by fire, tourism, and military construction.

==== Family Parmacellidae ====
Scientific name	Range	Comments
Parmacella gervaisii	La Crau, Provence, France	Not seen since its description in 1874. The species has been suggested to be the same as, or related to Drusia deshayesii from northern Morocco and Algeria, as well as an introduced species.

== Sea anemones, corals, and zoanthids (class Hexacorallia) ==
=== Sea anemones (order Actiniaria) ===
==== Family Edwardsiidae ====
===== Possibly extinct =====
Common name	Scientific name	Range	Comments	Pictures
Ivell's sea anemone	Edwardsia ivelli	Widewater Lagoon, West Sussex, England	Not recorded since 1983, possibly because of water pollution.	

== Plants (kingdom Plantae) ==
=== Lycopods (class Lycopodiopsida) ===
==== Quillworts (family Isoetaceae) ====
===== Possibly extinct =====
Common name	Scientific name	Range	Comments
Pindus quillwort	Isoetes heldreichii	Southern Pindus Mountains, Greece	Last recorded in 1885.

=== Flowering plants (clade Angiospermae) ===
==== Sunflowers (family Asteraceae) ====
Common name	Scientific name	Range	Comments
	Centaurea pseudoleucolepis	Kammenye Mogily, Donetsk, Ukraine	Last recorded in the 1930s. It is possible that it was a hybrid rather than a valid species.
Llanfairfechan hawkweed	Hieracium cambricogothicum	Gwynedd, Wales	Last collected in 1970. Extinct due to herbicide use and road construction.
York groundsel	Senecio eboracensis	York, England	Last individuals died in captivity around 1991. Seeds preserved at the Millennium Seed Bank in Sussex were later used to produce new plants and reintroduce them in 2023.

==== Broomrapes (family Orobanchaceae) ====
Scientific name	Range	Comments
Euphrasia mendoncae	Bragança, Portugal	Only known from the holotype collected in 1932, though it could be the same as E. minima.

==== True grasses (family Poaceae) ====
===== Extinct in the wild =====
Common name	Scientific name	Range	Comments	Pictures
Brome of the Ardennes	Bromus bromoideus	Ardennes; possibly introduced to Germany, Netherlands, and the United Kingdom	Last recorded in the wild in 1930. Grew in cultivated fields of spelt, and disappeared due to the use of herbicides and the abandonment of spelt agriculture. Survives in cutivation in Brest, France and the Botanic Garden of Liege, Belgium.	
Interrupted brome	Bromus interruptus	Wash to Severn estuaries, England	Disappeared from the wild in 1972, probably due to crop sprays and improved seed screening. Reintroduced in 2001.	

==== Primroses (family Primulaceae) ====
===== Extinct in the wild =====
Scientific name	Range	Comments	Pictures
Lysimachia minoricensis	Barranc de Sa Vall, Minorca, Spain	Disappeared from the wild between 1926 and 1950. The causes are unknown.	

==== Violets and pansies (family Violaceae) ====
Common name	Scientific name	Range	Comments
Pensée de Cry	Viola cryana	Canal de Bourgogne, France	Last recorded in 1927. Presumably extinct due to overcollection by botanists and limestone quarrying.

== See also ==
- List of Asian animals extinct in the Holocene
- Holocene extinction
- Lists of extinct species
- List of extinct bird species since 1500
- Extinct in the wild
- Lazarus taxon
