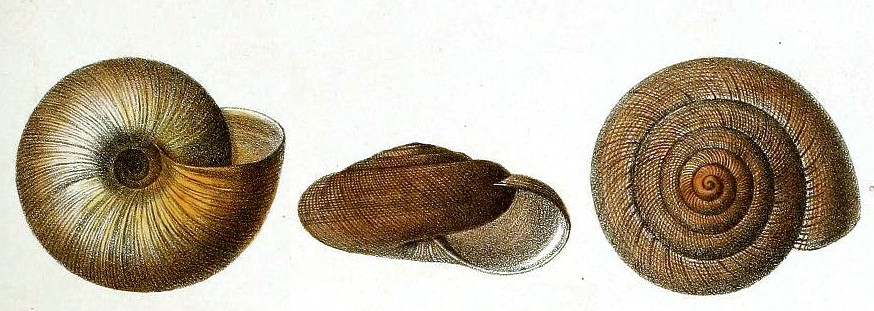
- Shell of Zonites kobelti from different perspectives.

Scientific classification
- Kingdom: Animalia
- Phylum: Mollusca
- Class: Gastropoda
- Order: Stylommatophora
- Family: Zonitidae
- Genus: Zonites
- Species: Z. kobelti

Binomial name
- Zonites kobelti O. Boettger, 1898

Synonyms
- Zonites albanicus E. von Martens, 1873 (misidentification, not Helix albanica Rossmässler, 1836); Zonites albanicus var. graeca Kobelt, 1876 (invalid; not Zonites verticillus var. graeca Kobelt, 1876 having precedence by First Reviewer's Choice)

= Zonites kobelti =

Species of gastropod

Zonites kobelti is a species of air-breathing land snail, a terrestrial pulmonate gastropod mollusk in the family Zonitidae. Its synonym name is Zonites albanicus

== Description ==
The altitude of the shell varies between 20 mm and 25 mm; its diameter between 40 mm and 45 mm. The shell is brownish on the upper side of the shell that's very sharply granulated with whitish or green hue on the lower side that's striated. The suture is deep, 5.5-6.5 weakly convex whorls and the apex is flat and smooth with the first whorls having no prominent keel and the last one slightly angulated. Near the aperture is a rounded surface; Umbilicus wide and perspectival. The species is similar to Zonites graecus but flatter.

== Distribution ==
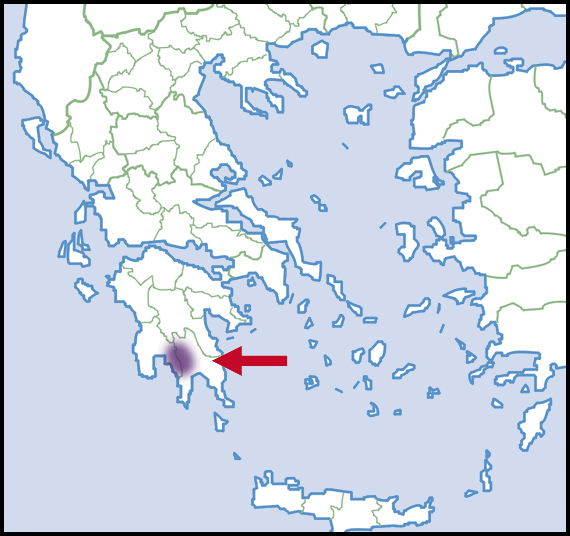
distribution

This species was found in the Peloponnese and in the Taigetos mountains up to 2400 m high in Greece.

=== Conservation status ===
The International Union for Conservation of Nature places Zonites kobelti as endangered due to being endemic to the Taigetos and habitat destruction. All species of the genus Zonites are endangered. Research is still needed to determine the population of this species.

=== Threats ===
The current threats for this species is climate change, agriculture/aquaculture and natural system modifications. Climate change impacts this species by slowly degrading the snail's environment. Agriculture and aquaculture also slowly degrades the environment, but it also decreases the mortality of the species. Natural system modifications increases the risk of wildfires that contribute to rapid decreases in the species' population as it decreases the mortality of the species and burns down their environment they live in.

== Habitat ==
This species is found to live in the rocky crevices of the upper parts of the Taigetos mountains; It also lives in shrublands of the Taigetos.
