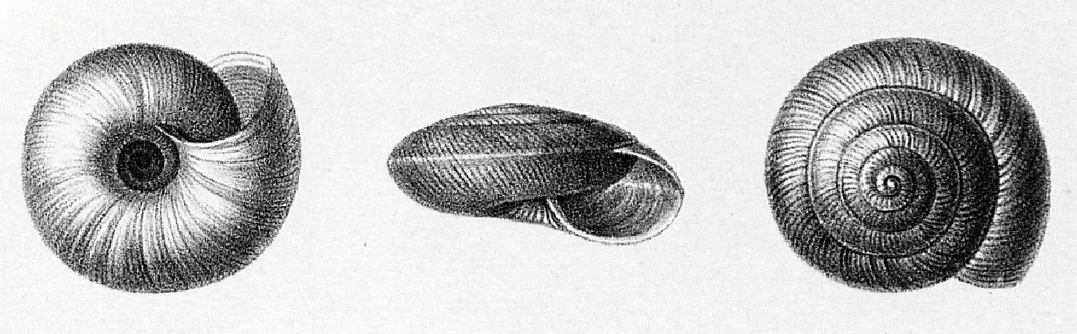
- Shell of Zonites oertzeni (holotype)

Scientific classification
- Kingdom: Animalia
- Phylum: Mollusca
- Class: Gastropoda
- Order: Stylommatophora
- Superfamily: Zonitoidea
- Family: Zonitidae
- Genus: Zonites
- Species: Z. oertzeni

Binomial name
- Zonites oertzeni E. von Martens, 1889

= Zonites oertzeni =

Species of gastropod

Zonites oertzeni is a species of air-breathing land snail, a terrestrial pulmonate gastropod mollusk in the family Zonitidae.

== Description ==
The altitude of the shell varies between 11 mm and 18 mm; its diameter between 22 mm and 35 mm.

The shell is broadly and openly umbilicated, featuring a convexly depressed shape that is obtusely angled. Its surface is marked by somewhat irregular striae and is lightly granulated on the upper side, displaying a reddish-tawny hue. In contrast, the underside is smooth, shiny, and paler in color.The spire is convex with a distinctly margined suture, composed of 6 1/2 whorls. The body whorl is clearly angled, though the angle remains obtuse; it is frequently somewhat compressed on both sides and does not descend at the front. The aperture is only slightly oblique and takes an ovate-round shape. The peristome is sharp, while the columellar margin is barely expanded.

== Distribution ==
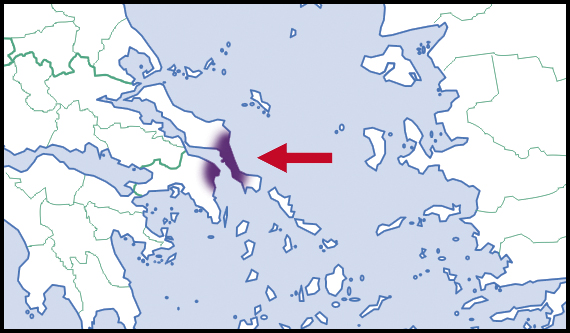
distribution

This species was found on the island in Euboea, Greece.
