= Carpathian wisent =

Conservation status
- Extinct (1852) (IUCN 3.1)

Scientific classification
- Kingdom: Animalia
- Phylum: Chordata
- Class: Mammalia
- Order: Artiodactyla
- Family: Bovidae
- Subfamily: Bovinae
- Genus: Bos
- Subgenus: Bison
- Species: B. bonasus
- Subspecies: †B. b. hungarorum

Trinomial name
- †Bison bonasus hungarorum (Kretzoi, 1946)

Extinct subspecies of bison

The Carpathian wisent (Bison bonasus hungarorum) is an extinct subspecies of the European bison that inhabited the Carpathian Mountains, Moldavia and Transylvania regions of Europe.

== Extinction ==
It began to die out about a hundred years earlier than its close relative, the Caucasian wisent (Bison bonasus caucasicus) and was hunted to extinction in the 19th century. The last known Carpathian wisent was shot in Máramaros County, Hungary in 1852.

== Trivia ==
Starting in 2014, wisents of the closely related lowland subspecies (Bison bonasus bonasus) were reintroduced into the southern Carpathians from Poland by Rewilding Europe and the World Wide Fund for Nature. The rewilding area hosted a population of 30 animals by the end of 2017.

== See also ==
- List of extinct animals of Europe
