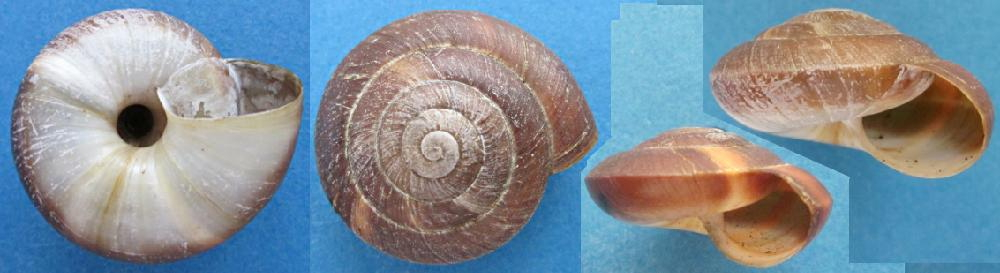
- Shell of Zonites euboeicus

Scientific classification
- Kingdom: Animalia
- Phylum: Mollusca
- Class: Gastropoda
- Order: Stylommatophora
- Superfamily: Zonitoidea
- Family: Zonitidae
- Genus: Zonites
- Species: Z. euboeicus

Binomial name
- Zonites euboeicus Kobelt, 1878

Synonyms
- Zonites verticillus var. euboeica Kobelt, 1878 superseded rank

= Zonites euboeicus =

Species of gastropod

Zonites euboeicus is a species of air-breathing land snail, a terrestrial pulmonate gastropod mollusk in the family Zonitidae.

== Description ==
The diameter of the shell attains 36 mm.

(Original description in Latin) It differs from the type in having a more distinctly carinate shell, with the keel persisting all the way to the aperture.

== Distribution ==
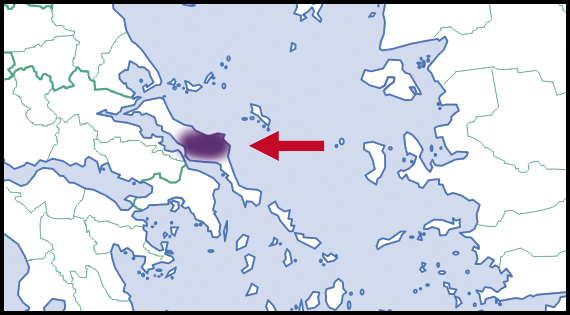
distribution

This species was found on the island Euboea, Greece.
