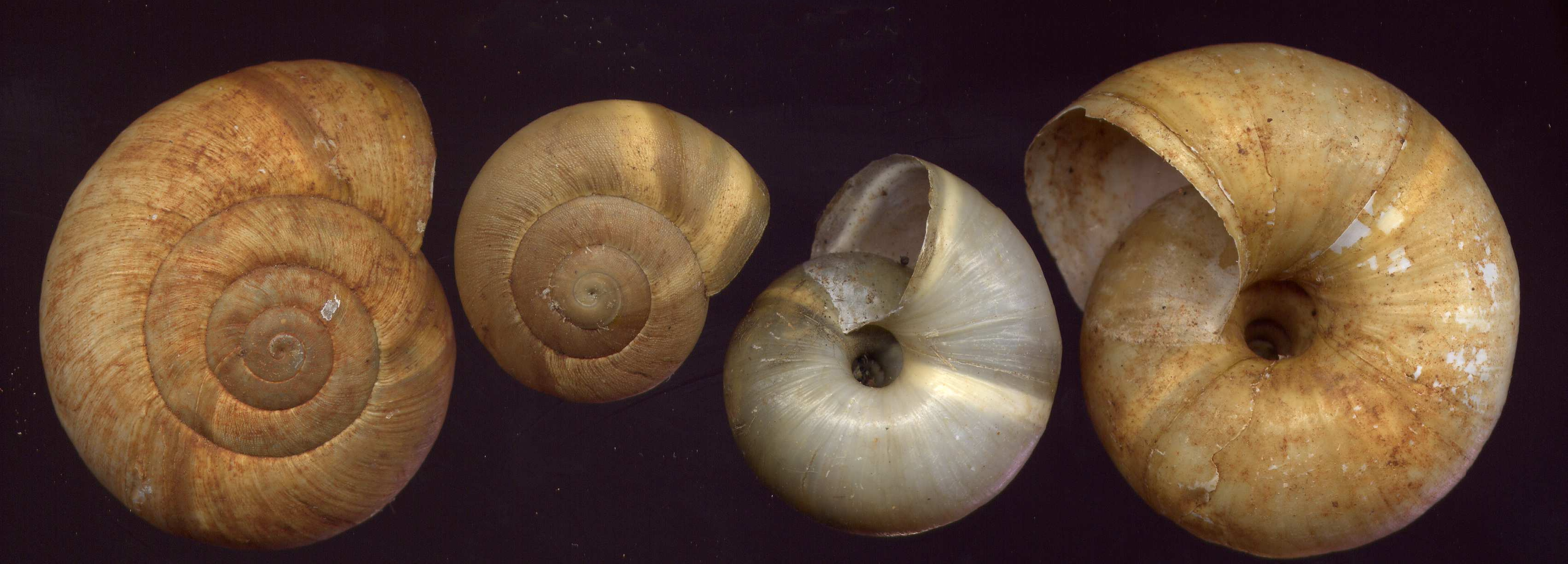
- Shell of Zonites caricus

Conservation status
- Vulnerable (IUCN 3.1)

Scientific classification
- Domain: Eukaryota
- Kingdom: Animalia
- Phylum: Mollusca
- Class: Gastropoda
- Order: Stylommatophora
- Superfamily: Zonitoidea
- Family: Zonitidae
- Genus: Zonites
- Species: Z. caricus

Binomial name
- Zonites caricus (J. R. Roth, 1839)

Synonyms
- Helix carica J. R. Roth, 1839 (original name); Zonites lycicus Kobelt & Rolle, 1895 junior subjective synonym; Zonites rollei Kobelt, 1895 junior subjective synonym (junior synonym)

= Zonites caricus =

Species of gastropod

Zonites caricus is a species of air-breathing land snail, a terrestrial pulmonate gastropod mollusk in the family Zonitidae.

== Distribution ==
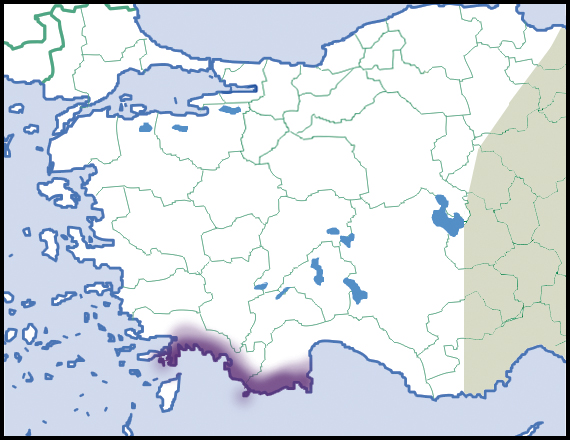
Distribution

The species is endemic to Turkey.
