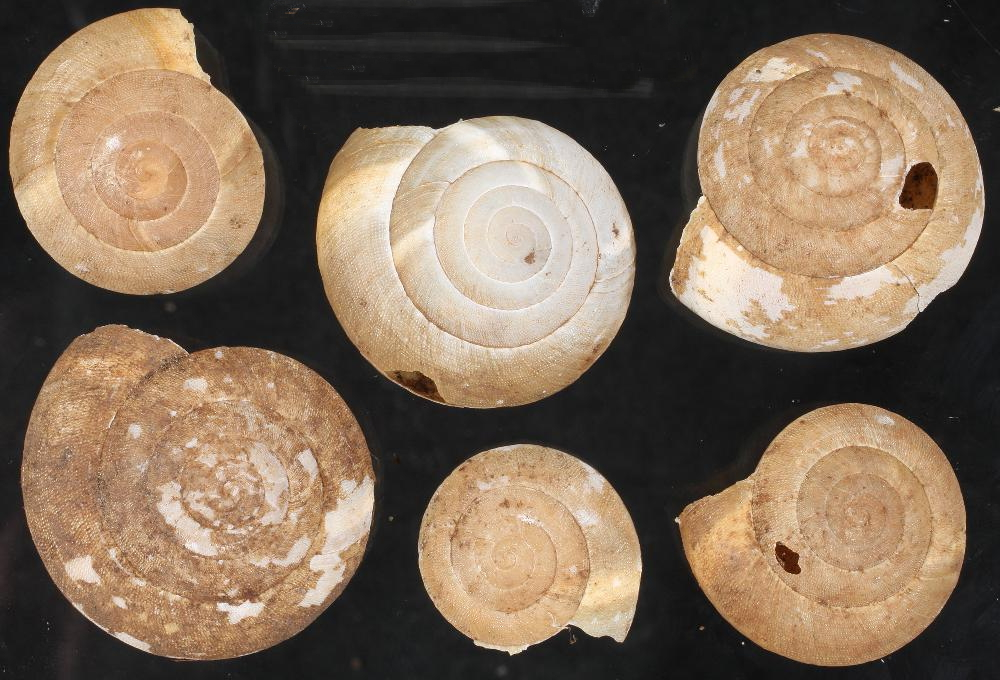
- Shell of Zonites humilis

Scientific classification
- Kingdom: Animalia
- Phylum: Mollusca
- Class: Gastropoda
- Order: Stylommatophora
- Superfamily: Zonitoidea
- Family: Zonitidae
- Genus: Zonites
- Species: Z. humilis

Binomial name
- Zonites humilis A. Riedel, 1982

= Zonites humilis =

Species of gastropod

Zonites humilis is a species of air-breathing land snail, a terrestrial pulmonate gastropod mollusk in the family Zonitidae.

== Description ==
The altitude of the shell varies between 12 mm and 20 mm; its diameter is between 18 mm and 30 mm.

== Distribution ==
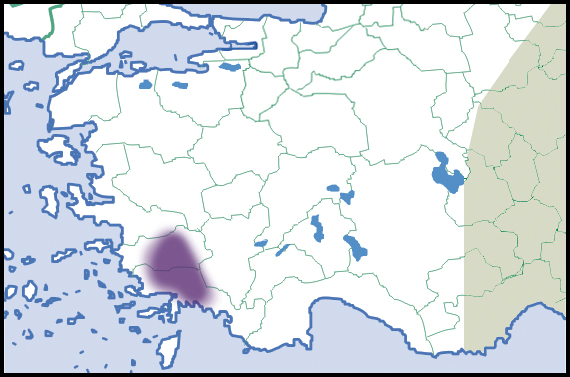
distribution

This species was found on the Mediterranean coast of Turkey.
