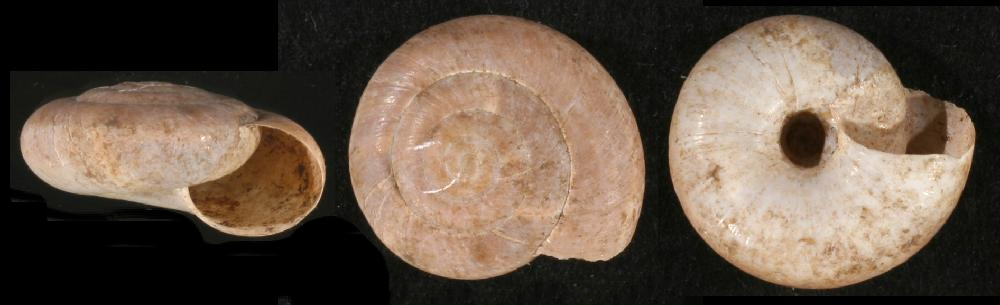
- Shell of Zonites rhodius

Scientific classification
- Kingdom: Animalia
- Phylum: Mollusca
- Class: Gastropoda
- Order: Stylommatophora
- Superfamily: Zonitoidea
- Family: Zonitidae
- Genus: Zonites
- Species: Z. rhodius

Binomial name
- Zonites rhodius E. von Martens, 1889

= Zonites rhodius =

Species of gastropod

Zonites rhodius is a species of air-breathing land snail, a terrestrial pulmonate gastropod mollusk in the family Zonitidae.

== Subspecies ==
- Zonites rhodius elatior E. von Martens, 1889
- Zonites rhodius martensi Pfeffer, 1930
- Zonites rhodius rhodius E. von Martens, 1889
- Zonites rhodius symius Pfeffer, 1930

== Description ==
The width of the shell varies between 12 mm and 20 mm; its diameter between 25 mm and 40 mm.

== Distribution ==
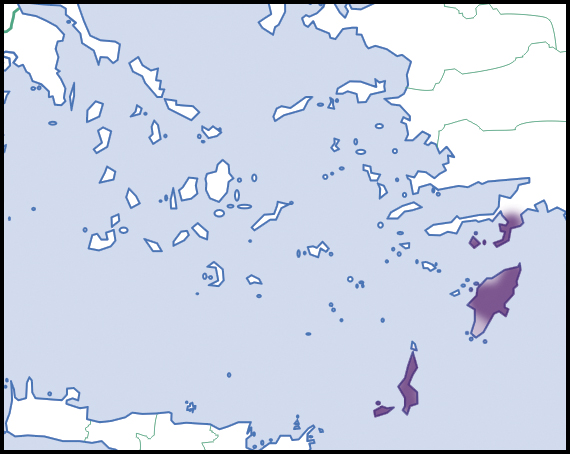
distribution

This species was found on the island Rhodos, Greece.
