= Perrin's cave beetle =

Conservation status
- Extinct (IUCN 3.1)

Scientific classification
- Domain: Eukaryota
- Kingdom: Animalia
- Phylum: Arthropoda
- Class: Insecta
- Order: Coleoptera
- Suborder: Adephaga
- Family: Dytiscidae
- Genus: Siettitia
- Species: †S. balsetensis

Binomial name
- †Siettitia balsetensis Abeille de Perrin, 1904

Species of beetle

Perrin's cave beetle, Siettitia balsetensis, is an extinct freshwater beetle from France. It and Siettitia ayenionensis are the only two species in the genus Siettitia.

This subterranean species was discoloured, its sensory silks were well developed and the eyes were extremely reduced yet probably functional. The tracheae of its wing-cases (elytra) were well developed and it absorbed dissolved oxygen through its cuticle.

== See also ==
- List of extinct animals of Europe
