= Zonites beydaglariensis =

Conservation status
- Vulnerable (IUCN 3.1)

Scientific classification
- Domain: Eukaryota
- Kingdom: Animalia
- Phylum: Mollusca
- Class: Gastropoda
- Order: Stylommatophora
- Superfamily: Zonitoidea
- Family: Zonitidae
- Genus: Zonites
- Species: Z. beydaglariensis

Binomial name
- Zonites beydaglariensis A. Riedel, 1982

Synonyms
- Zonites goldfussi P. Hesse, 1914

Species of gastropod

Zonites beydaglariensis is a species of air-breathing land snail, a terrestrial pulmonate gastropod mollusk in the family Zonitidae.

== Distribution ==
The species is endemic to Turkey.
