= Zonites anaphiensis =

Conservation status
- Vulnerable (IUCN 3.1)

Scientific classification
- Kingdom: Animalia
- Phylum: Mollusca
- Class: Gastropoda
- Order: Stylommatophora
- Family: Zonitidae
- Genus: Zonites
- Species: Z. anaphiensis

Binomial name
- Zonites anaphiensis Riedel & Mylonas, 1981

Species of gastropod

Zonites anaphiensis is a species of air-breathing land snail, a terrestrial pulmonate gastropod mollusk in the family Zonitidae. The species is endemic to the island of Anafi in Greece.

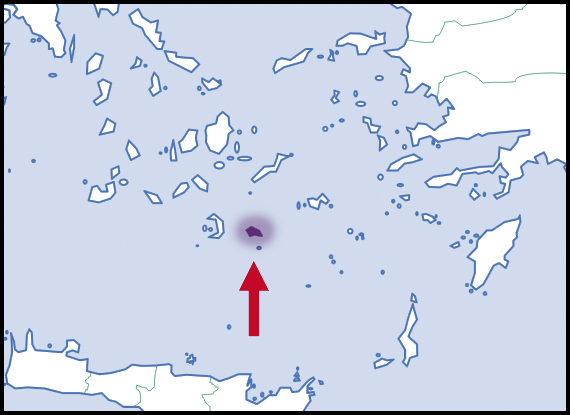
Distribution
