= Zonites goldfussi =

Scientific classification
- Kingdom: Animalia
- Phylum: Mollusca
- Class: Gastropoda
- Order: Stylommatophora
- Superfamily: Zonitoidea
- Family: Zonitidae
- Genus: Zonites
- Species: Z. goldfussi

Binomial name
- Zonites goldfussi Westerlund, 1890

Synonyms
- Zonites westerlundi Pfeffer, 1930 (junior synonym)

Species of gastropod

Zonites goldfussi is a species of air-breathing land snail, a terrestrial pulmonate gastropod mollusk in the family Zonitidae.

== Description ==
The diameter of the shell is 35 mm, the length attains 38 mm.

(Original description in Latin) The shell is openly umbilicated and orbicularly depressed, featuring a sculpture of coarse, somewhat irregular, and densely packed striae. These striae are transversely rugose, while the spiral sculpture is barely conspicuous.

The shell is reddish on the upper surface and olive-green beneath, encircled above the periphery by a narrow, poorly defined brown band.

The spire is only slightly elevated. It consists of 5 1/2 whorls that increase quite rapidly in size; these are somewhat convex and are separated by a well-impressed suture. The body whorl is nearly twice as wide as the penultimate; it is obsoletely angled above the middle and appears somewhat depressed at first, though it becomes more convex at the base. The aperture is large, broadly ovate, and lunate in shape. The peristome is simple, with the basal margin exhibiting a more pronounced curve.

== Distribution ==
This species was found in Anatolia, Turkey.
