= Zonites invitus =

Scientific classification
- Kingdom: Animalia
- Phylum: Mollusca
- Class: Gastropoda
- Order: Stylommatophora
- Superfamily: Zonitoidea
- Family: Zonitidae
- Genus: Zonites
- Species: Z. invitus

Binomial name
- Zonites invitus A. Riedel & Mylonas, 1995

Species of gastropod

Zonites invitus is a species of air-breathing land snail, a terrestrial pulmonate gastropod mollusk in the family Zonitidae.

== Description ==
The altitude of the shell varies between 8 mm and 14 mm; its diameter between 18 mm and 25 mm.

== Distribution ==
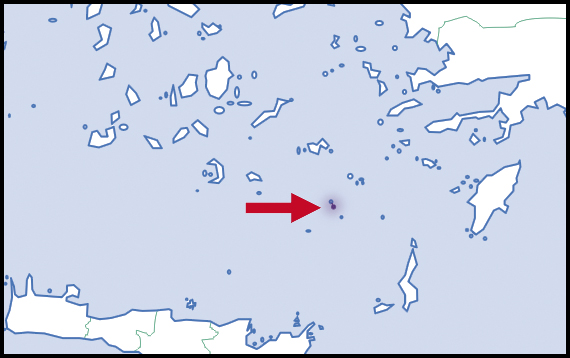
distribution

This species was found on southeast Aegean islands of Greece.
