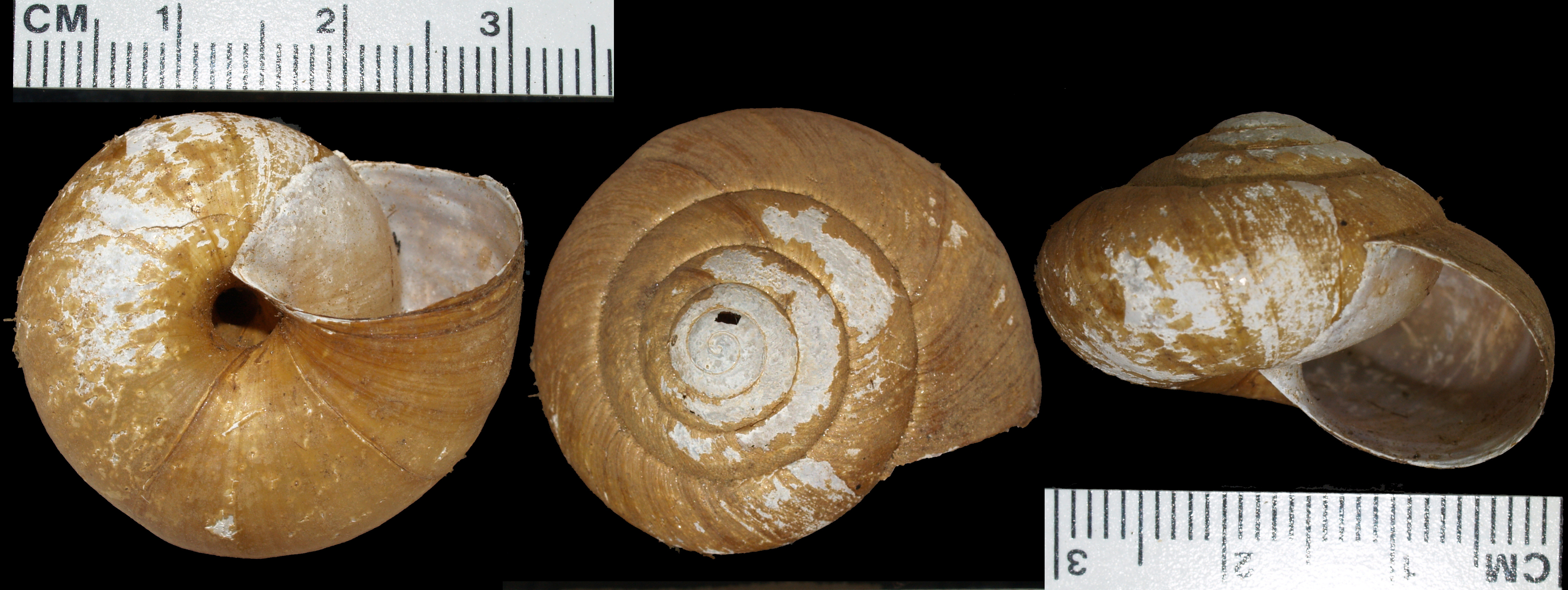
- Shell of Zonites chloroticus

Conservation status
- Vulnerable (IUCN 3.1)

Scientific classification
- Kingdom: Animalia
- Phylum: Mollusca
- Class: Gastropoda
- Order: Stylommatophora
- Superfamily: Zonitoidea
- Family: Zonitidae
- Genus: Zonites
- Species: Z. chloroticus

Binomial name
- Zonites chloroticus E. von Martens, 1889

Synonyms
- Helix chlorotica L. Pfeiffer, 1852 (original combination)

= Zonites chloroticus =

Species of gastropod

Zonites chloroticus is a species of air-breathing land snail, a terrestrial pulmonate gastropod mollusk in the family Zonitidae.

Subspecies

- Zonites chloroticus chloroticus (L. Pfeiffer, 1852)
- Zonites chloroticus polycrates E. von Martens, 1889

== Description ==
The diameter of the shell measures 27.05 mm, its height 16 mm.

(Original description in Latin) The shell is moderately umbilicated with an orbiculate-convex shape. It is relatively thin and possesses a greenish-yellow hue. The upper surface is densely and regularly granulated, while the body whorl features crowded longitudinal striations and more distant concentric lines, creating an oblong-granular texture. The spire is briefly conoid and convex, terminating in an obtuse apex.

There are 5 whorls in total; the uppermost whorls are scarcely convex, whereas the body whorl is more convex and subcarinate. The base is convex, uniform in color, smooth, and glossy. The aperture is large, only slightly oblique, and takes a lunate-rounded shape with a pearly (nacreous) interior.

The peristome is simple and straight, featuring a white internal lip. The margins of the peristome converge toward one another, and the columellar margin is slightly reflected at its upper portion.

== Distribution ==
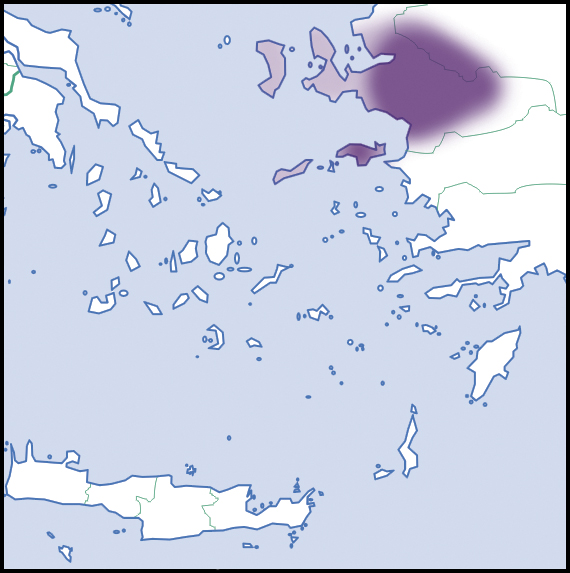
Distribution
