= Zonites astakidae =

Conservation status
- Vulnerable (IUCN 3.1)

Scientific classification
- Domain: Eukaryota
- Kingdom: Animalia
- Phylum: Mollusca
- Class: Gastropoda
- Order: Stylommatophora
- Superfamily: Zonitoidea
- Family: Zonitidae
- Genus: Zonites
- Species: Z. astakidae

Binomial name
- Zonites astakidae A. Riedel & Mylonas, 1981

Species of gastropod

Zonites astakidae is a species of air-breathing land snail, a terrestrial pulmonate gastropod mollusk in the family Zonitidae.

== Distribution ==
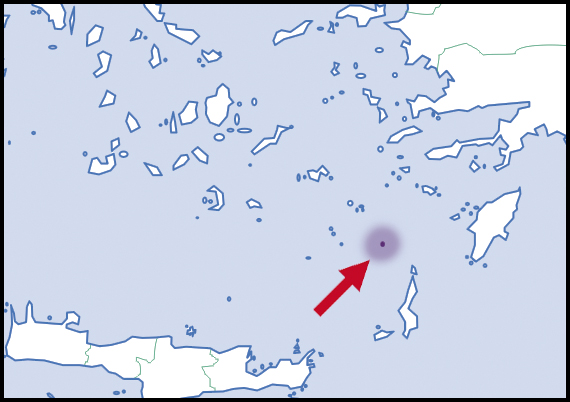
Distribution

The species is endemic to the island of Astakida in Greece.
