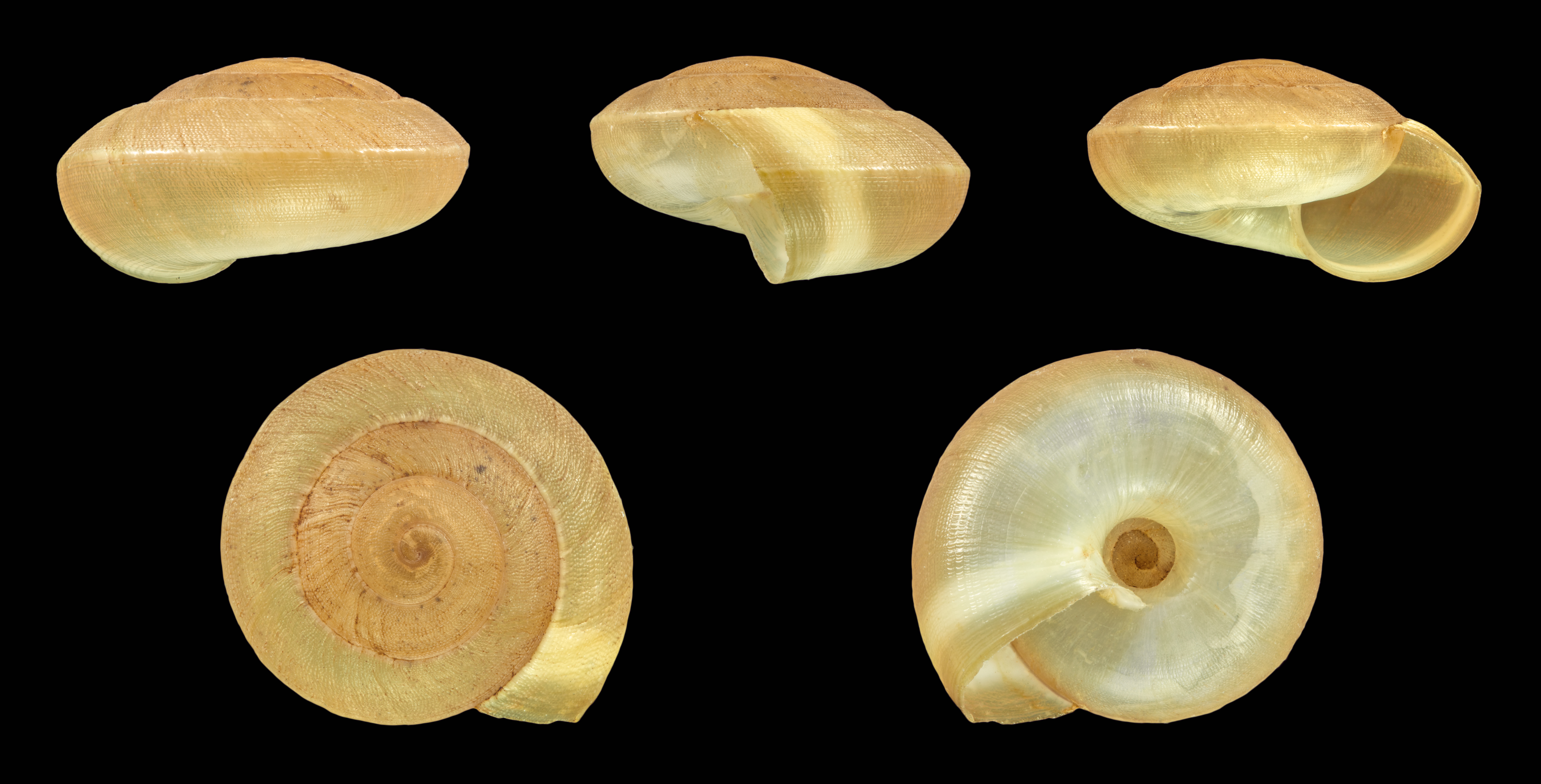
- Shell of Zonites messenicus

Scientific classification
- Kingdom: Animalia
- Phylum: Mollusca
- Class: Gastropoda
- Order: Stylommatophora
- Superfamily: Zonitoidea
- Family: Zonitidae
- Genus: Zonites
- Species: Z. messenicus

Binomial name
- Zonites messenicus Zilch, 1965

= Zonites messenicus =

Species of gastropod

Zonites messenicus is a species of air-breathing land snail, a terrestrial pulmonate gastropod mollusk in the family Zonitidae.

== Description ==
The altitude of the shell varies between 15 mm and 23 mm; its diameter between 25 mm and 40 mm.

== Distribution ==
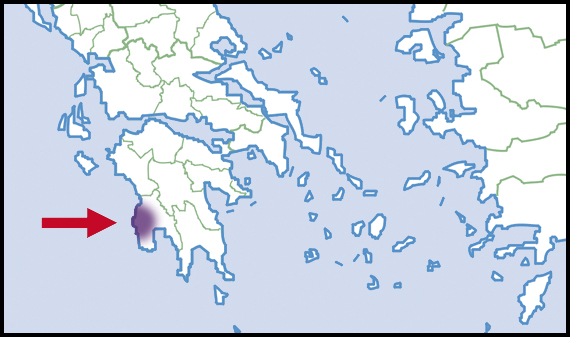
distribution

This species was found in the Peloponnese, Greece.
