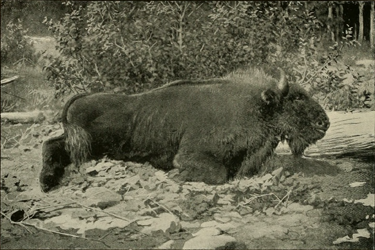
- An image of a killed Caucasian bison from E. Demidoff's book Hunting Trips in The Caucasus (1889)

Conservation status
- Extinct (1927) (IUCN 3.1)

Scientific classification
- Kingdom: Animalia
- Phylum: Chordata
- Class: Mammalia
- Order: Artiodactyla
- Family: Bovidae
- Subfamily: Bovinae
- Genus: Bison
- Species: B. bonasus
- Subspecies: †B. b. caucasicus

Trinomial name
- †Bison bonasus caucasicus (Turkin & Satunin, 1904)

= Caucasian wisent =

Extinct bison subspecies

The Caucasian wisent (Bison bonasus caucasicus), also known as the Eurasian bison or dombay (домбай) is an extinct subspecies of European bison that inhabited the Caucasus Mountains of Eastern Europe.

== Description ==
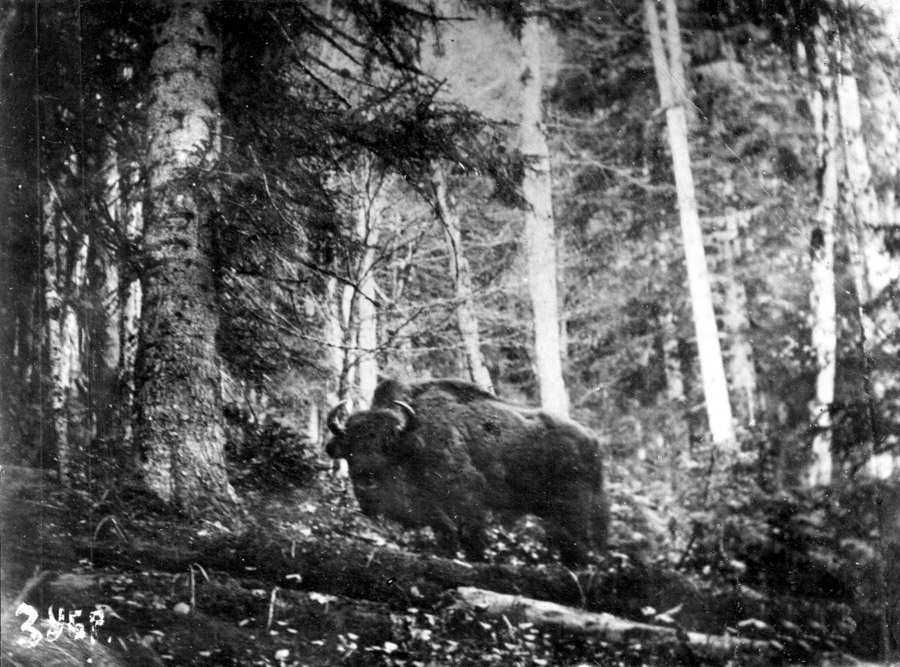
An alleged wild Caucasian bison in the 1900s

Little is known about the morphology of this subspecies, including its body size, as its extinction occurred in a time before the onset of many modern scientific approaches.

Compared to the extant lowland wisent, the Caucasian bison was more adapted to mountainous habitat. It is thought that the Caucasian bison was generally smaller, had shorter and rounder hooves, had more developed shoulder girdles, had significantly thicker and larger horns, less shaggy coats, and curly hairs on the rear of its head.

It was hunted by the Caspian tiger and the Asiatic lion, as well as by other predators such as steppe wolves and Syrian brown bears.

== Extinction and conservation ==
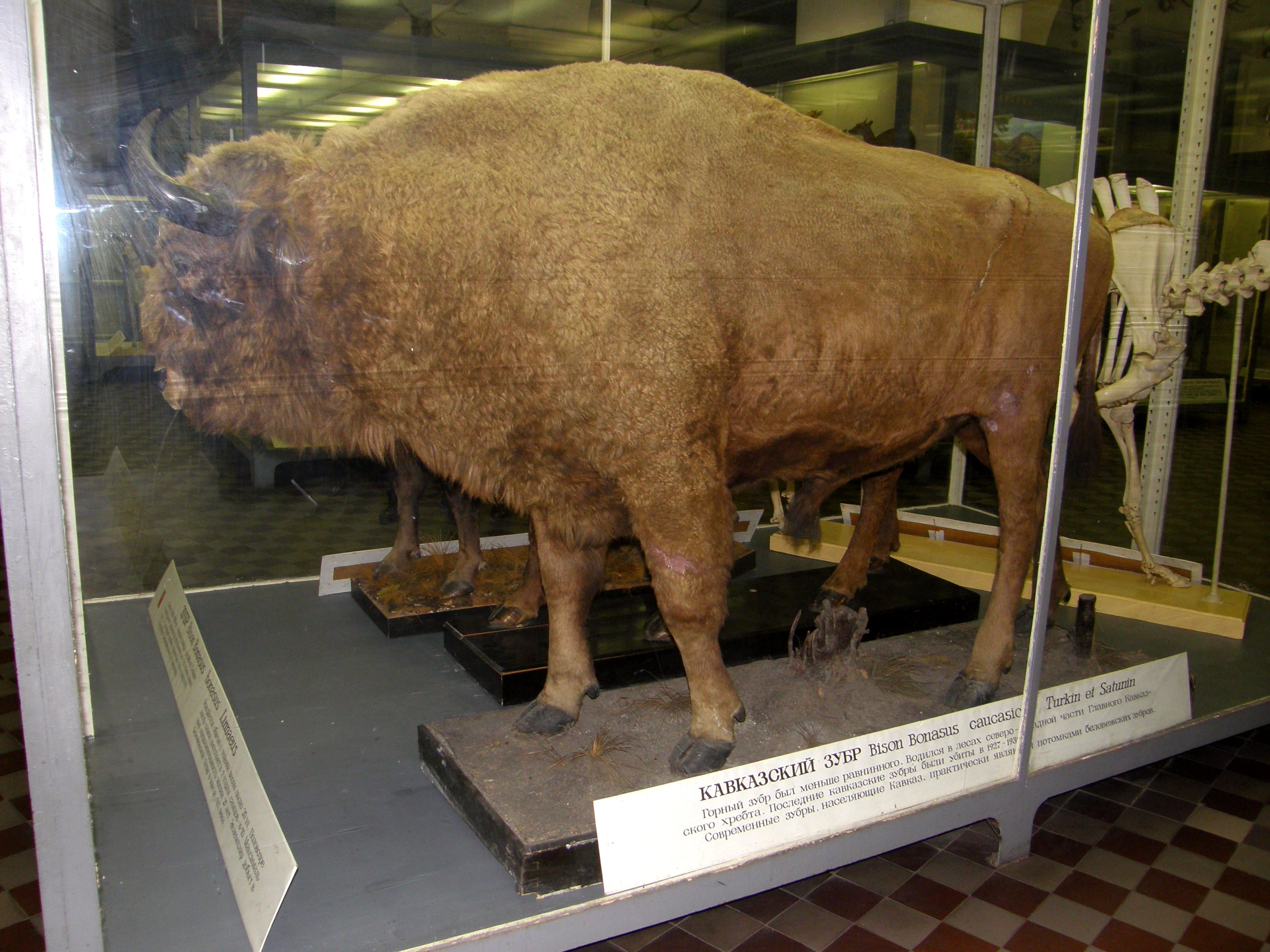
Taxidermied specimen, Museum of the Zoological Institute, Russia

In the 17th century, the Caucasian bison still populated a large area of the Western Caucasus. After that, human settlement in the mountains intensified and the range of the Caucasian wisent had become reduced to about one tenth of its original range by the end of the 19th century. In the 1860s, the population still numbered about 2,000, but had been reduced to only 500–600 by 1917 and to only 50 by 1921. Local poaching continued; finally, in 1927, the last three Caucasian wisent were killed.

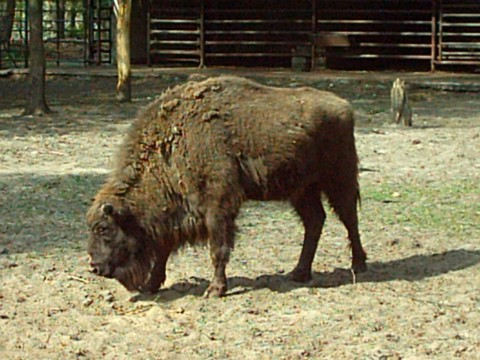
A hybrid in Poznań Zoo

Only one Caucasian bison bull is known to have been kept in captivity. This bull, named Kaukasus, was born in the Caucasus Mountains in 1907 and brought to Germany in 1908 where he lived until 26 February 1925. While in captivity, he bred with cows from the lowland subspecies Bison bonasus bonasus. Thus, he became one of the twelve ancestors of the present lowland-Caucasian breeding line of the European wisent pedigree book.

In 1940, a group of wisent-American bison hybrids were released into the Caucasian Biosphere Reserve and later in 1959 in the Nalchik Forestry Game Management Unit (Kabardino-Balkariya). Later some pure-blood wisent of the lowland-Caucasian breeding line were released there to form a single mixed herd together with the hybrids. In 2000, these hybrids were described as a different (without scientific basis) subspecies, the highland bison - Bison bonasus montanus (Polish).

== See also ==
- List of extinct animals of Europe
- Carpathian wisent
- Caucasian moose
