= Zonites pergranulatus =

Scientific classification
- Kingdom: Animalia
- Phylum: Mollusca
- Class: Gastropoda
- Order: Stylommatophora
- Superfamily: Zonitoidea
- Family: Zonitidae
- Genus: Zonites
- Species: Z. pergranulatus

Binomial name
- Zonites pergranulatus Kobelt, 1878

Species of gastropod

Zonites pergranulatus is a species of air-breathing land snail, a terrestrial pulmonate gastropod mollusk in the family Zonitidae.

== Subspecies ==
- Zonites pergranulatus cycladicus Pfeffer, 1930
- Zonites pergranulatus pergranulatus Kobelt, 1878

== Description ==
The altitude of the shell attains 17 mm; its diameter is 30 mm.

(Original description in Latin) The shell is widely and perspectively umbilicate, and is convex-depressed and keeled. It is somewhat irregularly finely striate and is covered on both upper and lower surfaces with extremely fine spiral lines that are granulate where they intersect. The coloration is brownish-fulvous, paler beneath, and is here and there marked with yellow and brown streaks. The spire is slightly elevated, and the suture is distinctly margined.

There are six regularly increasing whorls. The upper whorls are scarcely convex, whereas the body whorl is distinctly keeled and is compressed on both sides of the keel, being granulate above and below. Anteriorly, the body whorl does not descend.

The aperture is slightly oblique, ovate‑rounded, and angular at the keel, and it is strongly crescent-shaped. The peristome is simple, sharp, and deeply lipped, its margins being united by a very thin, translucent callus, with the columellar margin scarcely expanded.

== Distribution ==
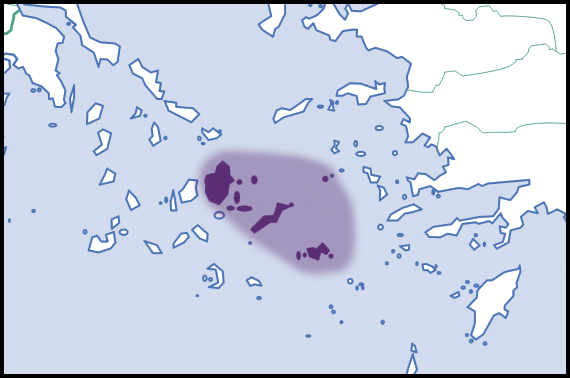
distribution

This species was found on the Cyclades, Greece.
