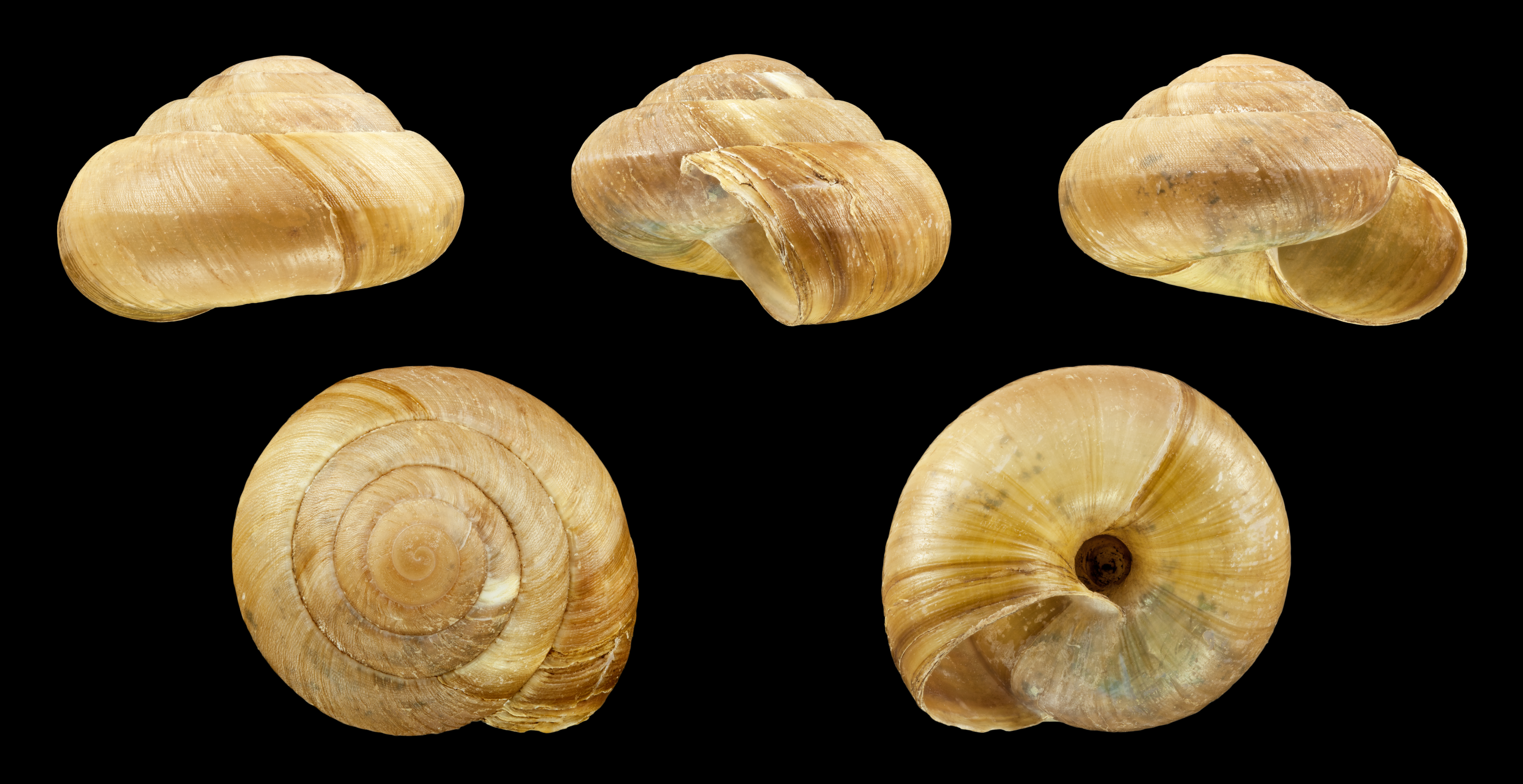
- Shell of Zonites graecus Kobelt, 1876

Scientific classification
- Kingdom: Animalia
- Phylum: Mollusca
- Class: Gastropoda
- Order: Stylommatophora
- Infraorder: Limacoidei
- Superfamily: Zonitoidea
- Family: Zonitidae
- Genus: Zonites; Montfort, 1810

Synonyms
- Helix (Zonites) Montfort, 1810 (considered a separate genus); Tonites auct. (incorrect subsequent spelling); Tragomma Held, 1838 junior objective synonym (junior objective synonym of Zonites, with the same type species); Verticillus Moquin-Tandon, 1848; Zonites (Aegophthalmus) P. Hesse, 1910; (Zonites) Montfort, 1810 · (no subgenera are recognized)

= Zonites =

Genus of gastropods

Zonites is a genus of mostly small, air-breathing land snails, terrestrial pulmonate gastropod mollusks in the family Zonitidae.

The genus Zonites, which includes 26 extant species, is distributed in the northeastern Mediterranean area and exhibits significant diversity and endemism.

== Description ==
The shell of species in this genus is more or less transparent, subdepressed and contains an umbilicus. The aperture is semilunar and usually lacks teeth. The outer lip is thin and sharp.

The animal is elongate and is able to retract completely within its shell. It has a more or less developed caudal mucous pit. The mantle lobes are small and not reflected on to the shell. The genital orifice is somewhat distant from the right tentacle. The jaw is marked by a median rostrum. The lateral teeth of the radula are bicuspidate, while the marginal teeth are sharp and narrowly unicuspidate.

== Species ==
Species within the genus Zonites include:

- Zonites algirus (Linnaeus, 1758) - type species
- Zonites anaphiensis Riedel & Mylonas, 1981
- Zonites astakidae Riedel, 1985
- † Zonites beckerplateni Schütt, 1985
- Zonites beydaglariensis A. Riedel, 1982
- † Zonites boisteli Depéret, 1895
- Zonites caricus (Roth, 1839)
- Zonites casius Martens, 1889
- Zonites chloroticus (Pfeiffer, 1851)
- Zonites embolium Fuchs & Käufel, 1936
  - Zonites embolium elevatus Riedel & Mylonas, 1997 - extinct
- Zonites euboeicus Kobelt, 1878
- Zonites festai Pollonera, 1916
- Zonites goldfussi Westerlund, 1890
- Zonites graecus Kobelt, 1876
- Zonites humilis Riedel, 1982
- Zonites invitus Riedel & Mylonas, 1995
- Zonites kobelti Boettger, 1898
- Zonites labiosus Westerlund, 1893
- Zonites messenicus Zilch, 1965
- Zonites nautarum Riedel & Mylonas, 1995
- Zonites nikariae Pfeffer, 1930
- Zonites nisyrius Riedel & Mylonas, 1997
- Zonites oertzeni Martens, 1889
- Zonites osmanicus Riedel, 1987
- Zonites parnonensis Riedel, 1985
- Zonites pergranulatus Kobelt, 1878
- Zonites rhodius Martens, 1889
- Zonites santoriniensis Riedel & Norris, 1987 - extinct
- Zonites sariae Riedel, 1985
- † Zonites siphnicus Fuchs & Käufel, 1936 - extinct
- Zonites smyrnensis (Roth, 1839)

In the course of time many species have been included in the genus Zonites that have become taxa inquirenda or synonyms that now belong to different other genera.
