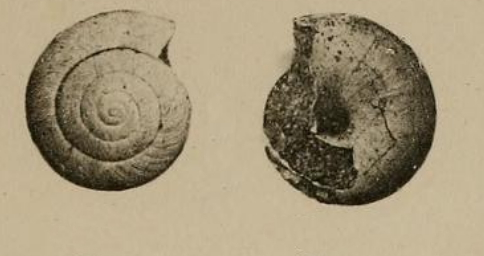
- Shell of † Zonites boisteli (holotype)

Conservation status
- Extinct (IUCN 3.1)

Scientific classification
- Kingdom: Animalia
- Phylum: Mollusca
- Class: Gastropoda
- Order: Stylommatophora
- Family: Zonitidae
- Genus: Zonites
- Species: †Z. boisteli

Binomial name
- †Zonites boisteli Depéret, 1895

= Zonites boisteli =

Species of mollusc

Zonites boisteli is an extinct species of air-breathing land snail, a terrestrial pulmonate gastropod mollusk in the family Zonitidae.

== Distribution ==
This extinct species was found in Tertiary strata in Bresse, France.
