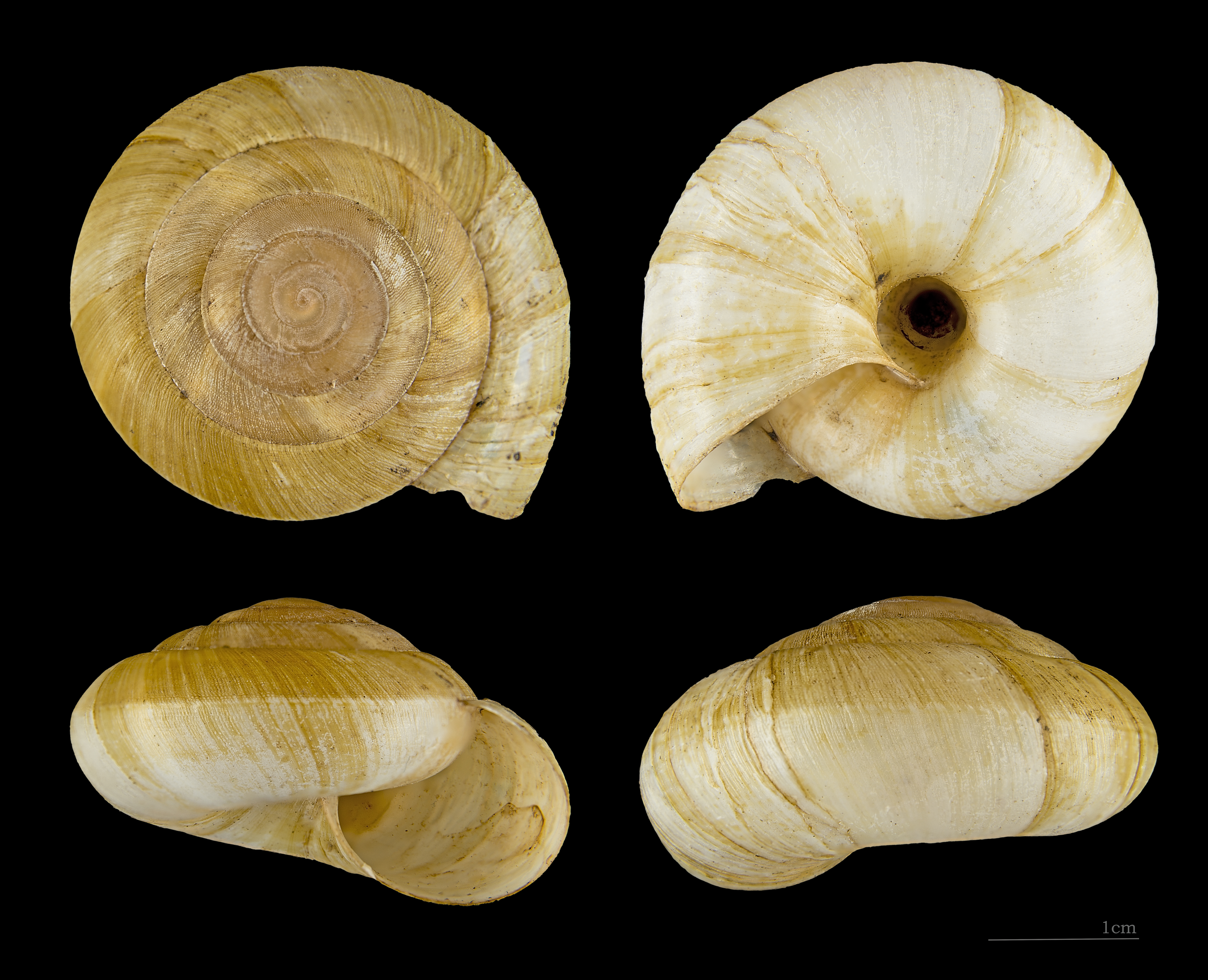
- shell of Zonites algirus

Scientific classification
- Kingdom: Animalia
- Phylum: Mollusca
- Class: Gastropoda
- Order: Stylommatophora
- Family: Zonitidae
- Genus: Zonites
- Species: Z. algirus

Binomial name
- Zonites algirus (Linnaeus, 1758)

Synonyms
- Helix algira Linnaeus, 1758; Zonites (Zonites) algirus (Linnaeus, 1758); Zonites anthesi Kobelt, 1903 junior subjective synonym; Zonites cytherae E. von Martens, 1891 (junior synonym)

= Zonites algirus =

Species of snail

Zonites algirus is a species of air-breathing land snail, a terrestrial pulmonate gastropod mollusc in the family Zonitidae.

== Distribution ==
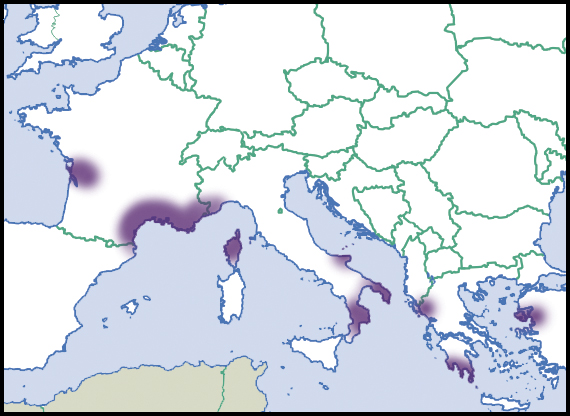
Distribution

This species occurs in Turkey, southern France and other areas.
