= Zonites sariae =

Conservation status
- Vulnerable (IUCN 3.1)

Scientific classification
- Kingdom: Animalia
- Phylum: Mollusca
- Class: Gastropoda
- Order: Stylommatophora
- Superfamily: Zonitoidea
- Family: Zonitidae
- Genus: Zonites
- Species: Z. sariae

Binomial name
- Zonites sariae A. Riedel, 1985

Species of gastropod

Zonites sariae is a species of air-breathing land snail, a terrestrial pulmonate gastropod mollusk in the family Zonitidae.

== Description ==
The length of the shell varies between 13 mm and 20 mm; its diameter is between 22 mm and 34 mm.

== Distribution ==
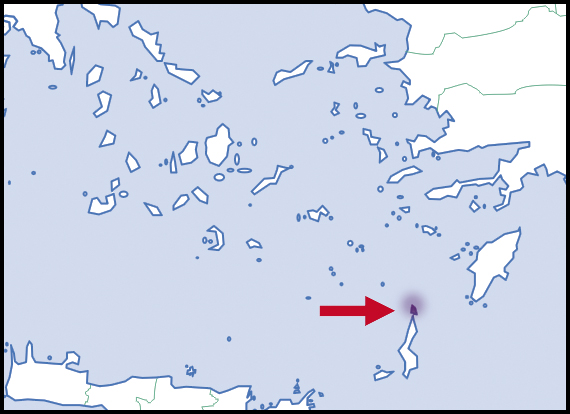
distribution

This species is endemic to the island Saria, Dodecanese, Greece. It's estimated Extent of occurrence is 12 km^{2}.
