= Zonites nisyrius =

Scientific classification
- Kingdom: Animalia
- Phylum: Mollusca
- Class: Gastropoda
- Order: Stylommatophora
- Superfamily: Zonitoidea
- Family: Zonitidae
- Genus: Zonites
- Species: Z. nisyrius

Binomial name
- Zonites nisyrius A. Riedel & Mylonas, 1997

Species of gastropod

Zonites nisyrius is a species of air-breathing land snail, a terrestrial pulmonate gastropod mollusk in the family Zonitidae.

== Description ==
The altitude of the shell varies between 20 mm and 25 mm; its diameter between 14 mm and 17 mm.

== Distribution ==
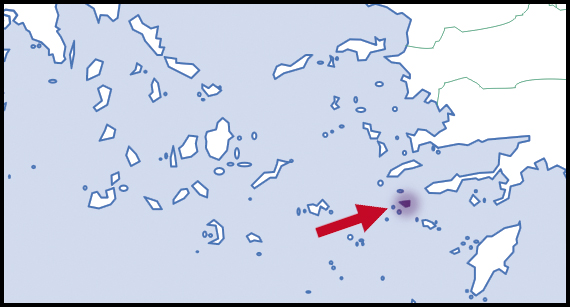
distribution

This species was found on island Nysiros, Greece.
