= Zonites nikariae =

Scientific classification
- Kingdom: Animalia
- Phylum: Mollusca
- Class: Gastropoda
- Order: Stylommatophora
- Superfamily: Zonitoidea
- Family: Zonitidae
- Genus: Zonites
- Species: Z. nikariae

Binomial name
- Zonites nikariae Pfeffer, 1930

Species of gastropod

Zonites nikariae is a species of air-breathing land snail, a terrestrial pulmonate gastropod mollusk in the family Zonitidae.

== Distribution ==
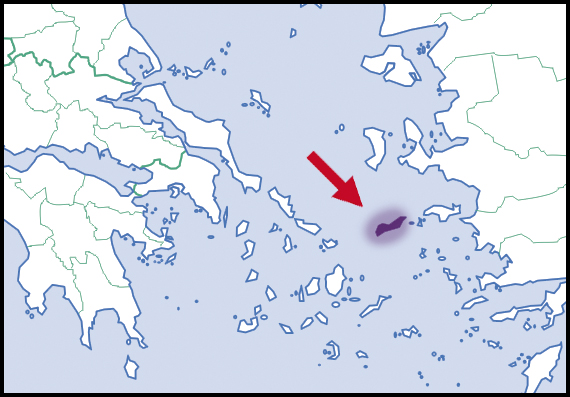
Distribution of Z. nikariae (Welter-Schultes 2012, the occurrence on Samos was not indicated there)

This species was found on islands Icaria, Samos and Delos, Greece.
