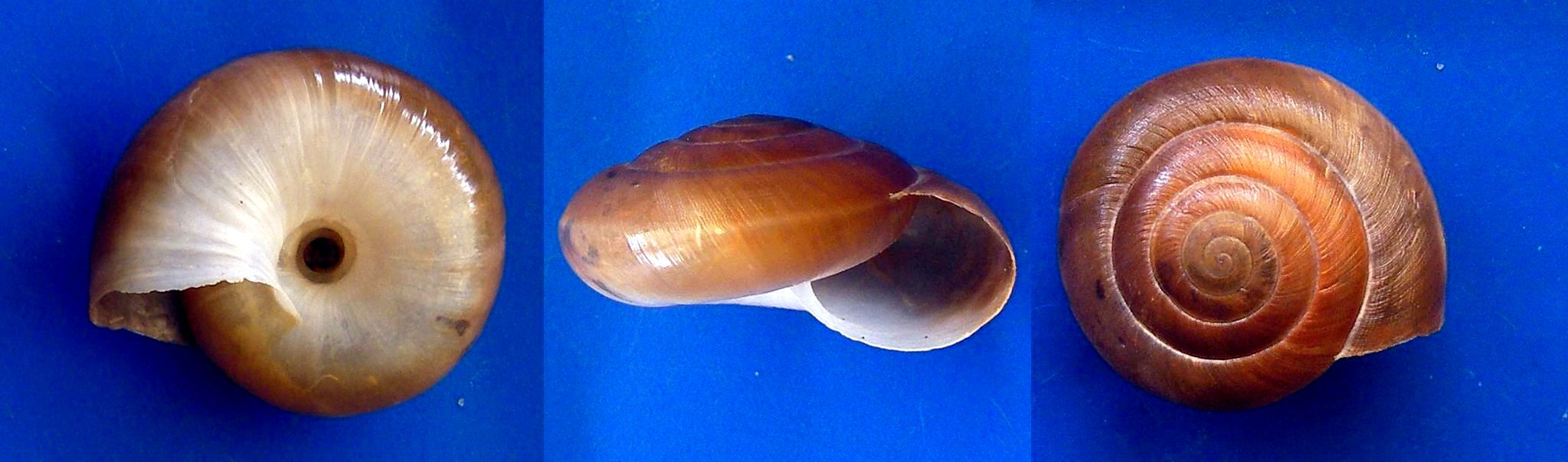
- Shell of Zonites parnonensis

Scientific classification
- Kingdom: Animalia
- Phylum: Mollusca
- Class: Gastropoda
- Order: Stylommatophora
- Superfamily: Zonitoidea
- Family: Zonitidae
- Genus: Zonites
- Species: Z. parnonensis

Binomial name
- Zonites parnonensis A. Riedel, 1985

= Zonites parnonensis =

Species of gastropod

Zonites parnonensis is a species of air-breathing land snail, a terrestrial pulmonate gastropod mollusk in the family Zonitidae.

Subspecies

- Zonites parnonensis fallax A. Riedel, 1985
- Zonites parnonensis parnonensis A. Riedel, 1985

== Description ==
The diameter of the shell attains 40 mm.

== Distribution ==
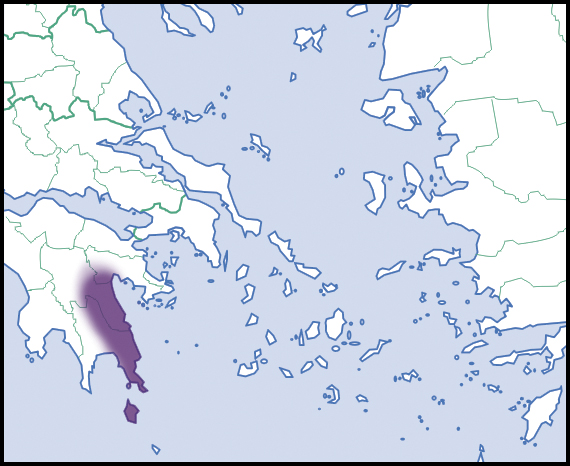
distribution

This species was found in the Peloponnese, Greece.
