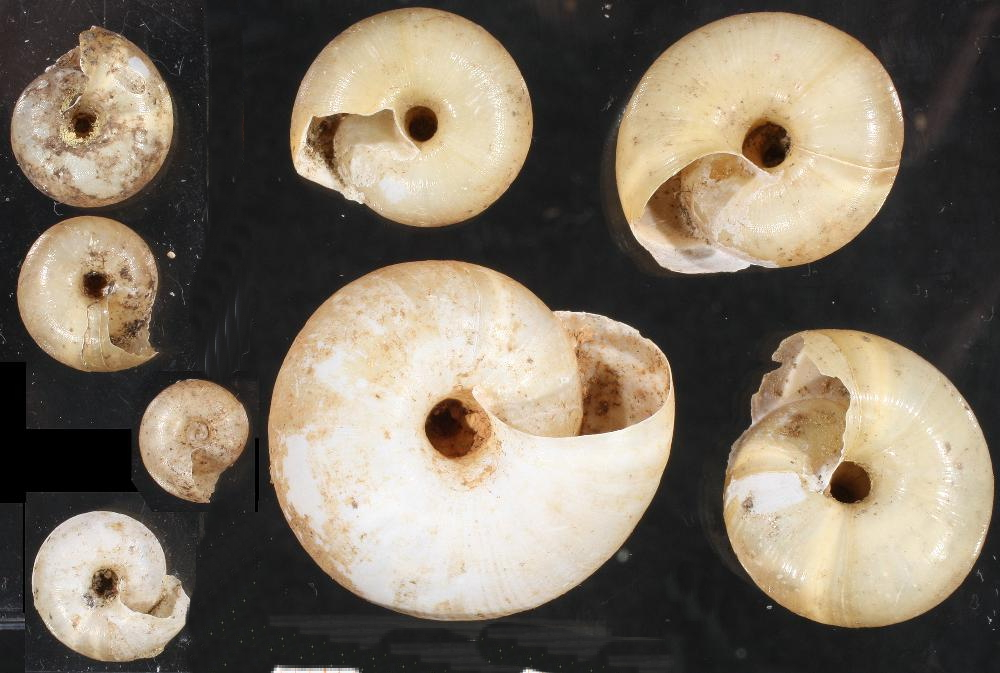
- Shell of Zonites festai

Scientific classification
- Kingdom: Animalia
- Phylum: Mollusca
- Class: Gastropoda
- Order: Stylommatophora
- Superfamily: Zonitoidea
- Family: Zonitidae
- Genus: Zonites
- Species: Z. festai

Binomial name
- Zonites festai Pollonera, 1916

= Zonites festai =

Species of gastropod

Zonites festai is a species of air-breathing land snail, a terrestrial pulmonate gastropod mollusk in the family Zonitidae.

== Subspecies ==
- Zonites festai anatolicus A. Riedel, 1982
- Zonites festai festai Pollonera, 1916

== Description ==
The altitude of the shell attains 12 mm to 20 mm; its diameter is 22 mm to 34 mm.

(Original description in Latin) The shell is globose-trochoid in form and rather narrowly umbilicate. It is distinctly granulated on both sides, with spiral grooves that surpass the striae; its color is horn-red, adorned with a few yellowish-tawny streaks. The spire is conical, with an obtuse apex. There are five somewhat flattened whorls, of which the body whorl is larger and slightly subangulate up to the aperture. The aperture is rounded and, on the inside, is adorned with a yellowish-tawny callus, while the right margin is very slightly subangulate.

== Distribution ==
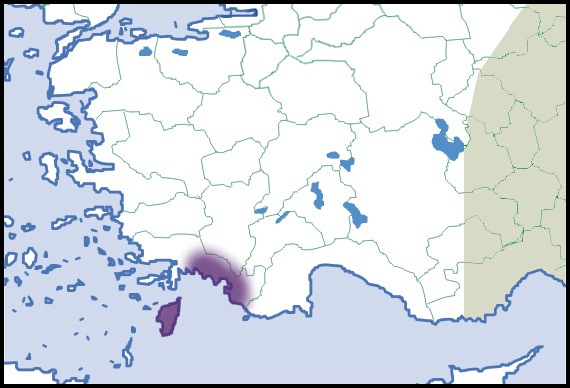
distribution

This species was found in Southwest Turkey.
