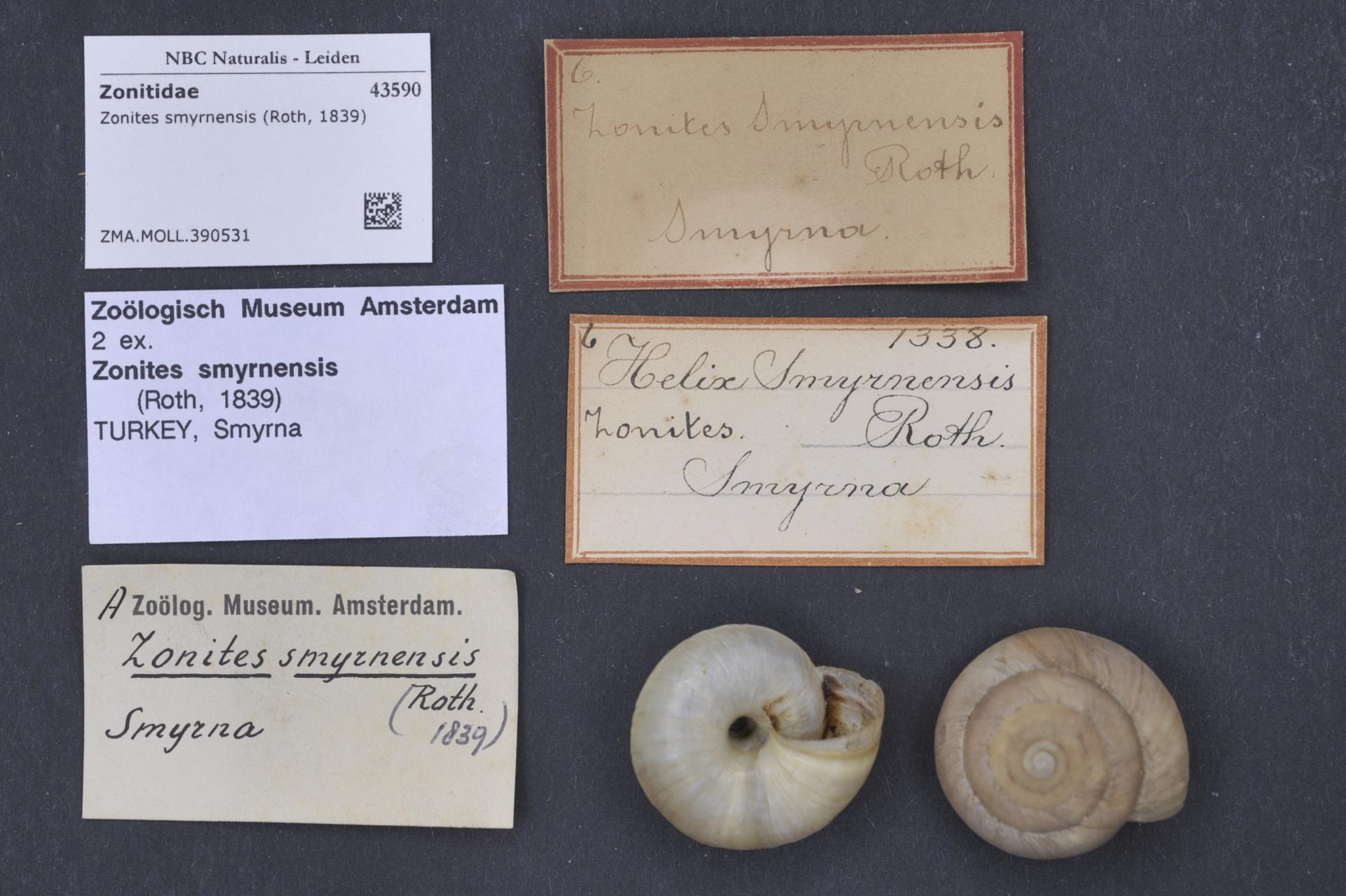
- Shell of Zonites smyrnensis (specimen at Naturalis Biodiversity Center)

Scientific classification
- Kingdom: Animalia
- Phylum: Mollusca
- Class: Gastropoda
- Order: Stylommatophora
- Superfamily: Zonitoidea
- Family: Zonitidae
- Genus: Zonites
- Species: Z. smyrnensis

Binomial name
- Zonites smyrnensis (J. R. Roth, 1839)

Synonyms
- Helix smyrnensis J. R. Roth, 1839 (original name)

= Zonites smyrnensis =

Species of gastropod

Zonites smyrnensis is a species of air-breathing land snail, a terrestrial pulmonate gastropod mollusk in the family Zonitidae.

== Description ==
The altitude of the shell varies between 10 mm and 16 mm; its diameter between 20 mm and 32 mm.

== Distribution ==
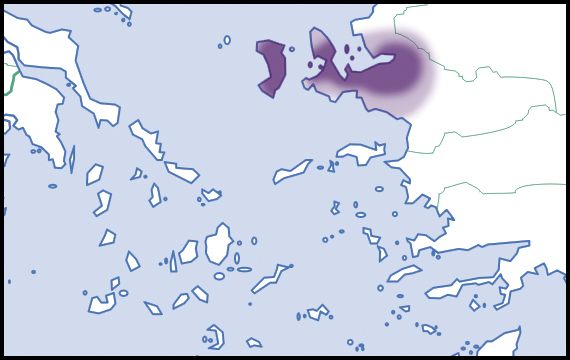
distribution

This species was found in Southwest Turkey.
