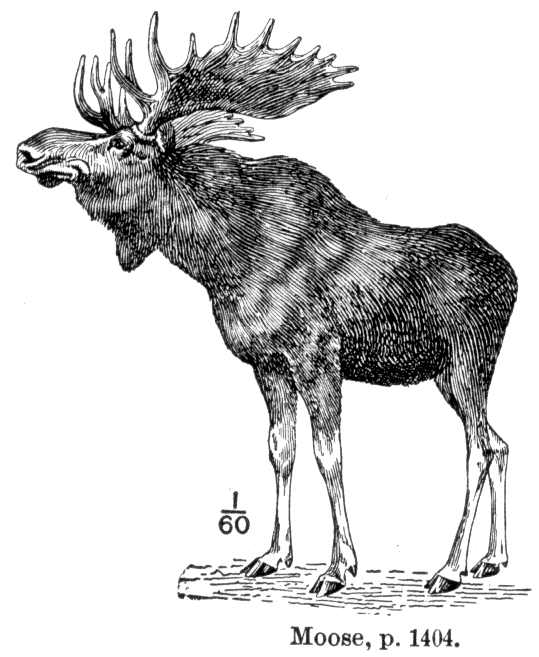
- 1841 illustration of male

Conservation status
- Extinct (1900)

Scientific classification
- Kingdom: Animalia
- Phylum: Chordata
- Class: Mammalia
- Order: Artiodactyla
- Family: Cervidae
- Subfamily: Capreolinae
- Genus: Alces
- Species: A. alces
- Subspecies: †A. a. caucasicus

Trinomial name
- †Alces alces caucasicus (Weretschagin, 1955)

= Caucasian moose =

Caucasian elk

Extinct moose subspecies

The Caucasian elk, also known as the Caucasian moose (Alces alces caucasicus) is an extinct subspecies of elk (moose) found in the Black Sea and the Caucasus Mountains of Eastern Europe and Asia Minor, in modern-day European Russia, Armenia, Azerbaijan, Georgia, and eastern Turkey and north and west Iran.

== Taxonomy ==
The subspecies was first described by Nikolay Kuzmich Vereshchagin in 1955. In 1999, Danilkin questioned whether they were sufficiently distinct from A. a. alces to merit a separate subspecies.

== Extinction ==
The subspecies was quite common until the mid-19th century, when populations began to decrease due to overhunting. It became extinct sometime in the beginning of the 20th century.

== Predators ==
Among its likely predators were the Anatolian or Persian leopard (also called the Caucasus leopard), Asiatic black bear, Eurasian brown bear, steppe wolves, the Asiatic lion (now restricted to India's Gir Forest) and the now-extinct Caspian tiger; The Eurasian lynx, golden eagles and the Asiatic cheetah—now restricted to Iran—all may have occasionally preyed on calves.

== See also ==
- List of extinct animals of Europe
- Caucasian wisent
