= Zonites labiosus =

Scientific classification
- Kingdom: Animalia
- Phylum: Mollusca
- Class: Gastropoda
- Order: Stylommatophora
- Superfamily: Zonitoidea
- Family: Zonitidae
- Genus: Zonites
- Species: Z. labiosus

Binomial name
- Zonites labiosus Westerlund, 1893

Synonyms
- Zonites kumanensis Pfeffer, 1930

Species of gastropod

Zonites labiosus is a species of air-breathing land snail, a terrestrial pulmonate gastropod mollusk in the family Zonitidae.

== Description ==
The altitude of the shell varies between 16 mm and 17 mm; its diameter between 23 mm and 27 mm.

The shell is relatively small, narrowly umbilicate, with a strongly elevated spire and a rounded periphery with only a weak, blunt keel. The aperture is nearly circular. A characteristic feature is broad, pale radial stripes that develop during periods of growth arrest, corresponding to internal shell thickenings known as "lips" (Lippen) a feature reflected in the species name labiosus (Latin: labium, lip).

== Distribution ==
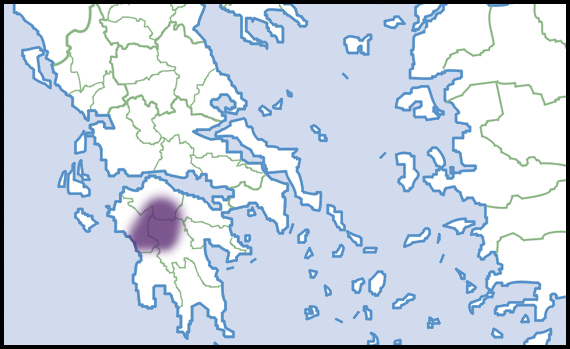
distribution

This species is found in the mountains of the northwestern Peloponnese, Greece, specifically in Achaia, Elis and Arcadia, where it is described as widely distributed and not uncommon.

The type locality is Olenos (the Erymanthos mountain range on the border of Achaia and Elis), from where the species was first described by Westerlund in 1893.
