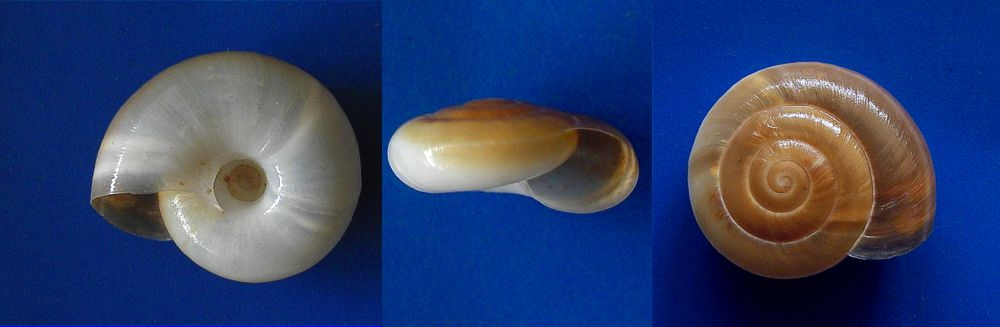
- Shell of Zonites casius

Conservation status
- Vulnerable (IUCN 3.1)

Scientific classification
- Kingdom: Animalia
- Phylum: Mollusca
- Class: Gastropoda
- Order: Stylommatophora
- Superfamily: Zonitoidea
- Family: Zonitidae
- Genus: Zonites
- Species: Z. casius

Binomial name
- Zonites casius E. von Martens, 1889

= Zonites casius =

Species of gastropod

Zonites casius is a species of air-breathing land snail, a terrestrial pulmonate gastropod mollusk in the family Zonitidae.

== Description ==
The shell measures 27.05 mm.

== Distribution ==
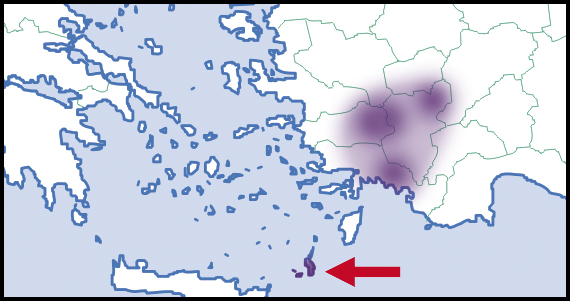
Distribution

The species is endemic to the island of Karpathos, Greece.
