= Siettitia =

Scientific classification
- Domain: Eukaryota
- Kingdom: Animalia
- Phylum: Arthropoda
- Class: Insecta
- Order: Coleoptera
- Suborder: Adephaga
- Family: Dytiscidae
- Tribe: Hydroporini
- Genus: Siettitia; Abeille de Perrin, 1904

Genus of beetles

Siettitia is a genus of beetles in the family Dytiscidae, containing the following species:

- Siettitia avenionensis Guignot, 1925
- Siettitia balsetensis Abeille de Perrin, 1904
