= Zonites osmanicus =

Scientific classification
- Kingdom: Animalia
- Phylum: Mollusca
- Class: Gastropoda
- Order: Stylommatophora
- Superfamily: Zonitoidea
- Family: Zonitidae
- Genus: Zonites
- Species: Z. osmanicus

Binomial name
- Zonites osmanicus A. Riedel, 1987

Synonyms
- Zonites (Turcozonites) osmanicus A. Riedel, 1987 (basionym)

Species of gastropod

Zonites osmanicus is a species of air-breathing land snail, a terrestrial pulmonate gastropod mollusk in the family Zonitidae.

== Description ==
The altitude of the shell varies between 10 mm and 14 mm; its diameter between 20 mm and 27 mm.

== Distribution ==
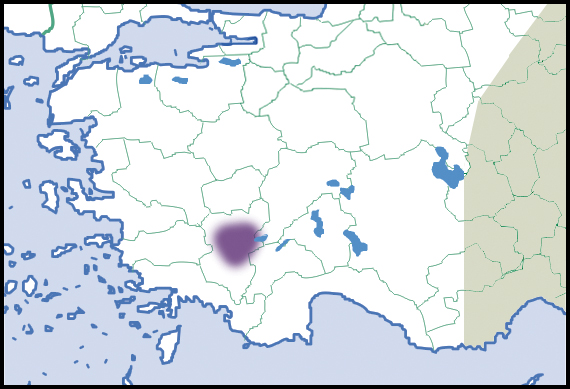
distribution

This species was found in Southwest Turkey.
