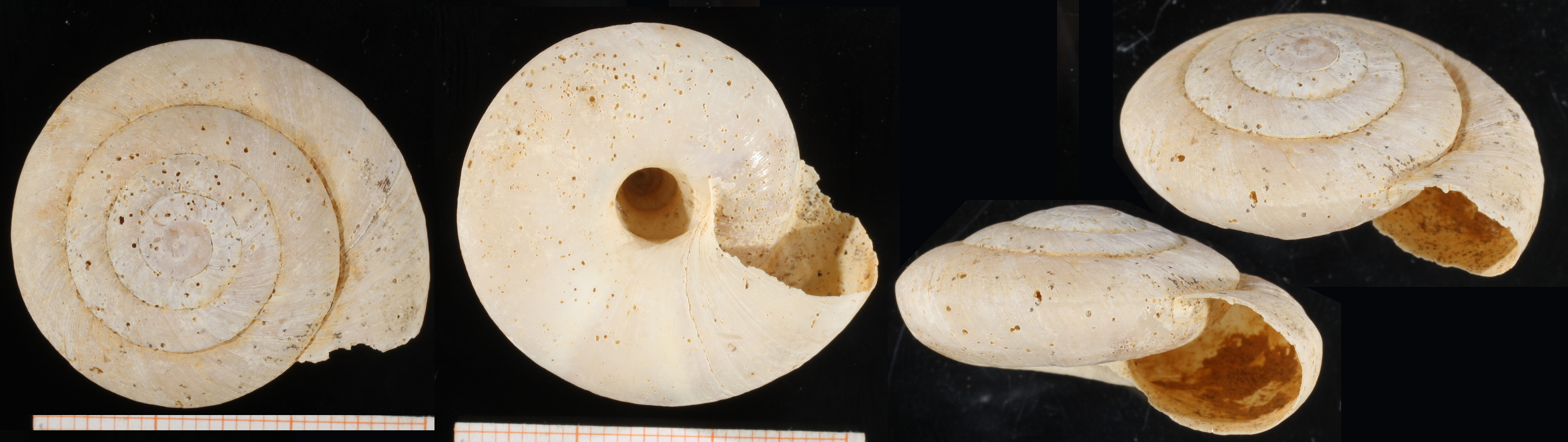
- Shell of Zonites siphnicus

Conservation status
- Extinct (IUCN 3.1)

Scientific classification
- Kingdom: Animalia
- Phylum: Mollusca
- Class: Gastropoda
- Order: Stylommatophora
- Family: Zonitidae
- Genus: Zonites
- Species: †Z. siphnicus

Binomial name
- †Zonites siphnicus Fuchs & Käufel, 1936

= Zonites siphnicus =

Species of mollusc

Zonites siphnicus is an extinct species of air-breathing land snail, a terrestrial pulmonate gastropod mollusk in the family Zonitidae.

Zonites siphnicus is considered to be extinct.

== Description ==
The altitude of the shell varies between 13 mm and 16 mm; its diameter between 28 mm and 33 mm.

== Distribution ==
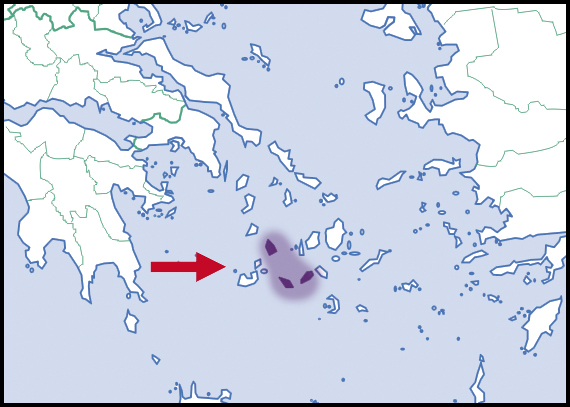
Distribution

This species was endemic to Cyclades Islands, Greece.
