= Zonites santoriniensis =

Conservation status
- Extinct (IUCN 3.1)

Scientific classification
- Kingdom: Animalia
- Phylum: Mollusca
- Class: Gastropoda
- Order: Stylommatophora
- Family: Zonitidae
- Genus: Zonites
- Species: †Z. santoriniensis

Binomial name
- †Zonites santoriniensis Riedel & Norris, 1987

Species of mollusc

Zonites santoriniensis is an extinct species of air-breathing land snail, a terrestrial pulmonate gastropod mollusk belonging to the Glass Snail family Zonitidae.

Zonites santoriniensis is considered to be extinct. It went extinct during the Minoan Eruption.

== Description ==
The altitude of the shell varies between 17 mm and 23 mm; its diameter between 25 mm and 37 mm.

== Distribution ==
This species was endemic to Cyclades Islands, Greece.
