= Zonites embolium =

Conservation status
- Critically endangered, possibly extinct (IUCN 3.1)

Scientific classification
- Domain: Eukaryota
- Kingdom: Animalia
- Phylum: Mollusca
- Class: Gastropoda
- Order: Stylommatophora
- Family: Zonitidae
- Genus: Zonites
- Species: Z. embolium

Binomial name
- Zonites embolium Fuchs & Käufel, 1936

Species of gastropod

Zonites embolium is a species of air-breathing land snail, a terrestrial pulmonate gastropod mollusk in the family Zonitidae.

== Subspecies ==
- Zonites embolium elevatus Riedel & Mylonas, 1997, that was endemic to Dodecanese Islands, is considered to be extinct.
- Zonites embolium embolium A. Fuchs & Käufel, 1936

== Distribution ==
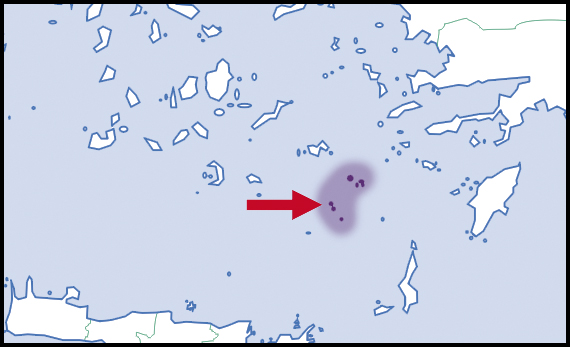
distribution

Greece
