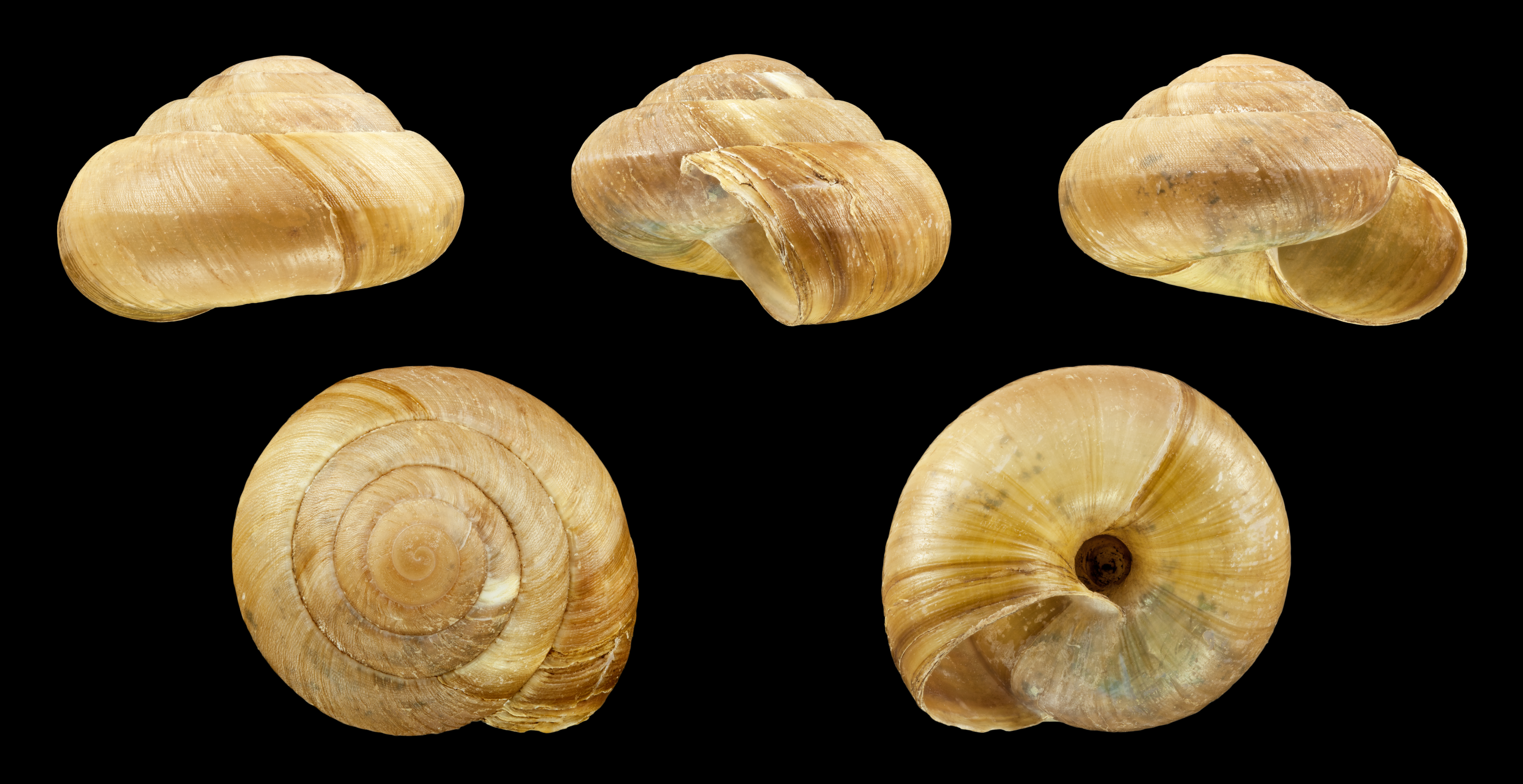
- Shell of Zonites graecus

Scientific classification
- Kingdom: Animalia
- Phylum: Mollusca
- Class: Gastropoda
- Order: Stylommatophora
- Superfamily: Zonitoidea
- Family: Zonitidae
- Genus: Zonites
- Species: Z. graecus

Binomial name
- Zonites graecus Kobelt, 1878

Synonyms
- Zonites verticillus var. graeca Kobelt, 1876 (basionym)

= Zonites graecus =

Species of gastropod

Zonites graecus is a species of air-breathing land snail, a terrestrial pulmonate gastropod mollusk in the family Zonitidae.

== Description ==
The diameter of the shell attains 34 mm.

== Distribution ==
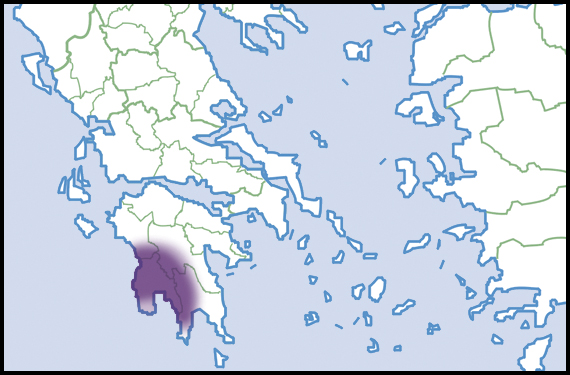
distribution

This species was found in the Peloponnese, Greece.
