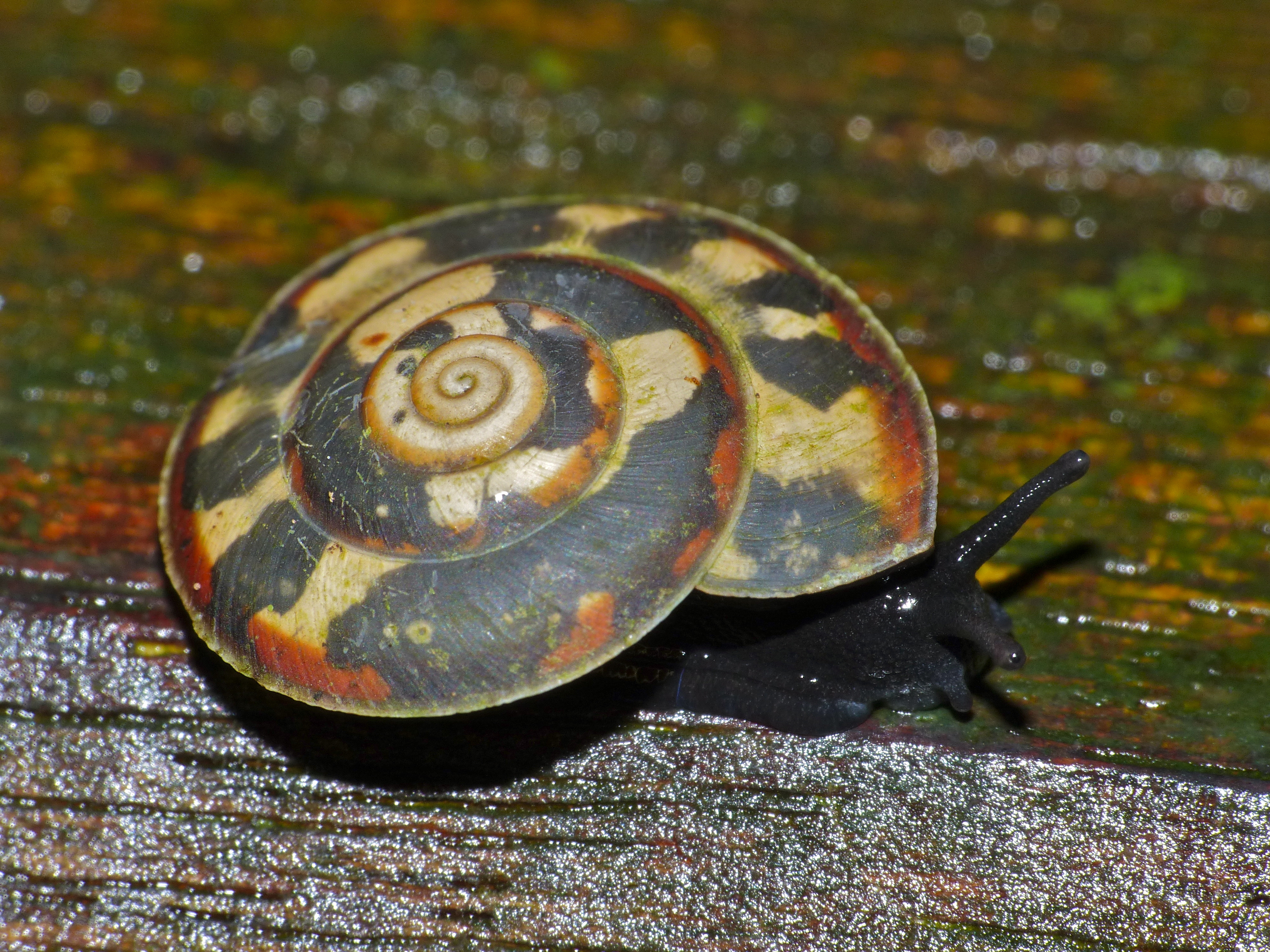
- Shell of Videna metcalfii

Conservation status
- Data Deficient (IUCN 3.1)

Scientific classification
- Kingdom: Animalia
- Phylum: Mollusca
- Class: Gastropoda
- Order: Stylommatophora
- Family: Trochomorphidae
- Genus: Videna
- Species: V. metcalfii

Binomial name
- Videna metcalfii (L. Pfeiffer, 1845)

Synonyms
- Helix metcalfii L. Pfeiffer, 1845 superseded combination; Trochomorpha (Videna) metcalfei (L. Pfeiffer, 1845) (misspelling of original name); Trochomorpha metcalfei (L. Pfeiffer, 1845) (incorrect subsequent spelling and...); Trochomorpha metcalfii (L. Pfeiffer, 1845) · unaccepted; Videna (Videna) metcalfei (L. Pfeiffer, 1845) ·

= Videna metcalfii =

Species of mollusc

Videna metcalfii is a species of terrestrial pulmonate gastropod mollusk in the family Trochomorphidae. It is native to areas of Southeast Asia.

== Description ==
The height of the shell attains 7 millimetres (0.28 in), its diameter 23.25 millimetres (0.915 in); the height of the aperture 7.5 millimetres (0.30 in), its diameter 10.25 millimetres (0.404 in).

(Original description in Latin) The shell is broadly umbilicated, flattened, and discoidal, with a sharply keeled edge. It is finely striated and pale horn-colored or reddish horn-colored, with a single chestnut band on each side near the white keel. The spire is only slightly raised. There are six whorls, scarcely convex, the last one hardly descending toward the front. The aperture is somewhat triangular, and the peristome is simple: the upper margin is flattened and curved forward in a slight expansion, while the basal margin is gently arched toward the columella.

V. metcalfii is difficult to distinguish from V. electra due to similar external morphology. Dissection of the genitalia and close inspection of the shell is often required.

== Distribution ==
This species of land snail is found in parts of the Philippines and Malaysia.
