= Brazieria minuscula =

Conservation status
- Data Deficient (IUCN 2.3)

Scientific classification
- Kingdom: Animalia
- Phylum: Mollusca
- Class: Gastropoda
- Order: Stylommatophora
- Family: Trochomorphidae
- Genus: Brazieria
- Species: B. minuscula

Binomial name
- Brazieria minuscula H.B. Baker, 1941

Species of gastropod

Brazieria minuscula is a species of air-breathing land snails, terrestrial pulmonate gastropod mollusks in the family Zonitidae, the true glass snails. This species is endemic to Micronesia. It was listed as Vulnerable in 1994 until changing to Data Deficient two years later.
