= Brazieria obesa =

Conservation status
- Data Deficient (IUCN 2.3)

Scientific classification
- Kingdom: Animalia
- Phylum: Mollusca
- Class: Gastropoda
- Order: Stylommatophora
- Family: Trochomorphidae
- Genus: Brazieria
- Species: B. obesa

Binomial name
- Brazieria obesa H.B. Baker, 1941

Species of gastropod

Brazieria obesa is a species of air-breathing land snails, terrestrial pulmonate gastropod mollusks in the family Zonitidae, the true glass snails. This species is endemic to Micronesia. It was listed as Vulnerable in 1994 until changing to Data Deficient in 1996.
