= Brazieria velata =

Conservation status
- Data Deficient (IUCN 2.3)

Scientific classification
- Kingdom: Animalia
- Phylum: Mollusca
- Class: Gastropoda
- Order: Stylommatophora
- Family: Trochomorphidae
- Genus: Brazieria
- Species: B. velata

Binomial name
- Brazieria velata (Hombron & Jacquinot, 1841)

Species of gastropod

Brazieria velata is a species of air-breathing land snails, terrestrial pulmonate gastropod mollusks in the family Zonitidae, the true glass snails. This species is endemic to Micronesia. It was listed as Vulnerable in 1994 until changing to Data Deficient two years later.
