= Kondoa kondorum =

Conservation status
- Data Deficient (IUCN 2.3)

Scientific classification
- Kingdom: Animalia
- Phylum: Mollusca
- Class: Gastropoda
- Order: Stylommatophora
- Family: Trochomorphidae
- Genus: Kondoa
- Species: K. kondorum

Binomial name
- Kondoa kondorum Nakagawa and Banno, 1989

Species of gastropod

Kondoa kondorum is a species of small, air-breathing land snails, terrestrial pulmonate gastropod mollusks in the family Trochomorphidae .

== Distribution ==
This species is endemic to Micronesia.
