= Trochomorpha carolinae =

Conservation status
- Data Deficient (IUCN 2.3)

Scientific classification
- Kingdom: Animalia
- Phylum: Mollusca
- Class: Gastropoda
- Order: Stylommatophora
- Family: Trochomorphidae
- Genus: Trochomorpha
- Species: T. carolinae

Binomial name
- Trochomorpha carolinae Baker, 1941

Species of gastropod

Trochomorpha carolinae is a species of air-breathing land snail, a terrestrial pulmonate gastropod mollusk in the family Trochomorphidae.

This species is endemic to Micronesia.
