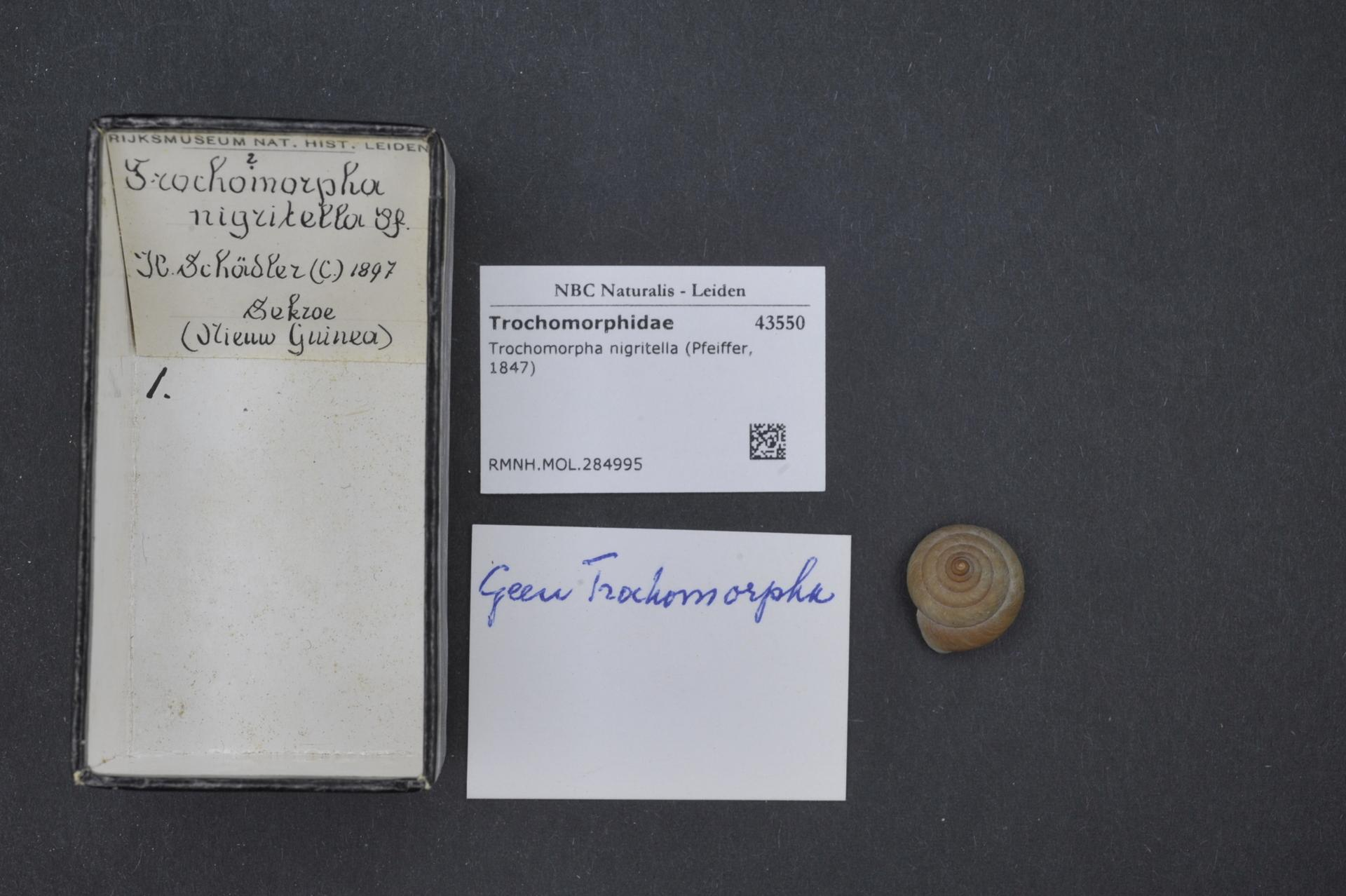
- Trochomorphidae nigritella

Conservation status
- Data Deficient (IUCN 2.3)

Scientific classification
- Kingdom: Animalia
- Phylum: Mollusca
- Class: Gastropoda
- Order: Stylommatophora
- Family: Trochomorphidae
- Genus: Trochomorpha
- Species: T. nigritella

Binomial name
- Trochomorpha nigritella (L. Pfeiffer, 1847)

= Trochomorpha nigritella =

Species of gastropod

Trochomorpha nigritella is a species of air-breathing land snail, a terrestrial pulmonate gastropod mollusk in the family Trochomorphidae.

This species is endemic to Micronesia.
