= Ogaridiscus subrupicola =

Conservation status
- Critically Imperiled (NatureServe)

Scientific classification
- Kingdom: Animalia
- Phylum: Mollusca
- Class: Gastropoda
- Order: Stylommatophora
- Family: Zonitidae
- Genus: Ogaridiscus
- Species: O. subrupicola

Binomial name
- Ogaridiscus subrupicola Dall, 1877

Synonyms
- Hyalina subrupicola Dall, 1877; Vitrea subrupicola (Dall, 1877); Pristiloma subrupicola (Dall, 1877)

Species of gastropod

Ogaridiscus subrupicola, common name the southern tightcoil, is a species of air-breathing land snail, a terrestrial pulmonate gastropod in the family Zonitidae. No subspecies are listed in the Catalog of Life.

== Distribution ==
This species is endemic to the United States, occurring in the Mountain-Prairie Region:

- Idaho
- Utah, USA
