= Theskelomensor creon =

Conservation status
- Vulnerable (IUCN 2.3)

Scientific classification
- Kingdom: Animalia
- Phylum: Mollusca
- Class: Gastropoda
- Order: Stylommatophora
- Family: Trochomorphidae
- Genus: Theskelomensor
- Species: T. creon

Binomial name
- Theskelomensor creon Solem, 1958

Species of gastropod

Theskelomensor creon is a species of air-breathing land snail, a terrestrial pulmonate gastropod mollusk in the family Endodontidae. This species is endemic to Australia.
