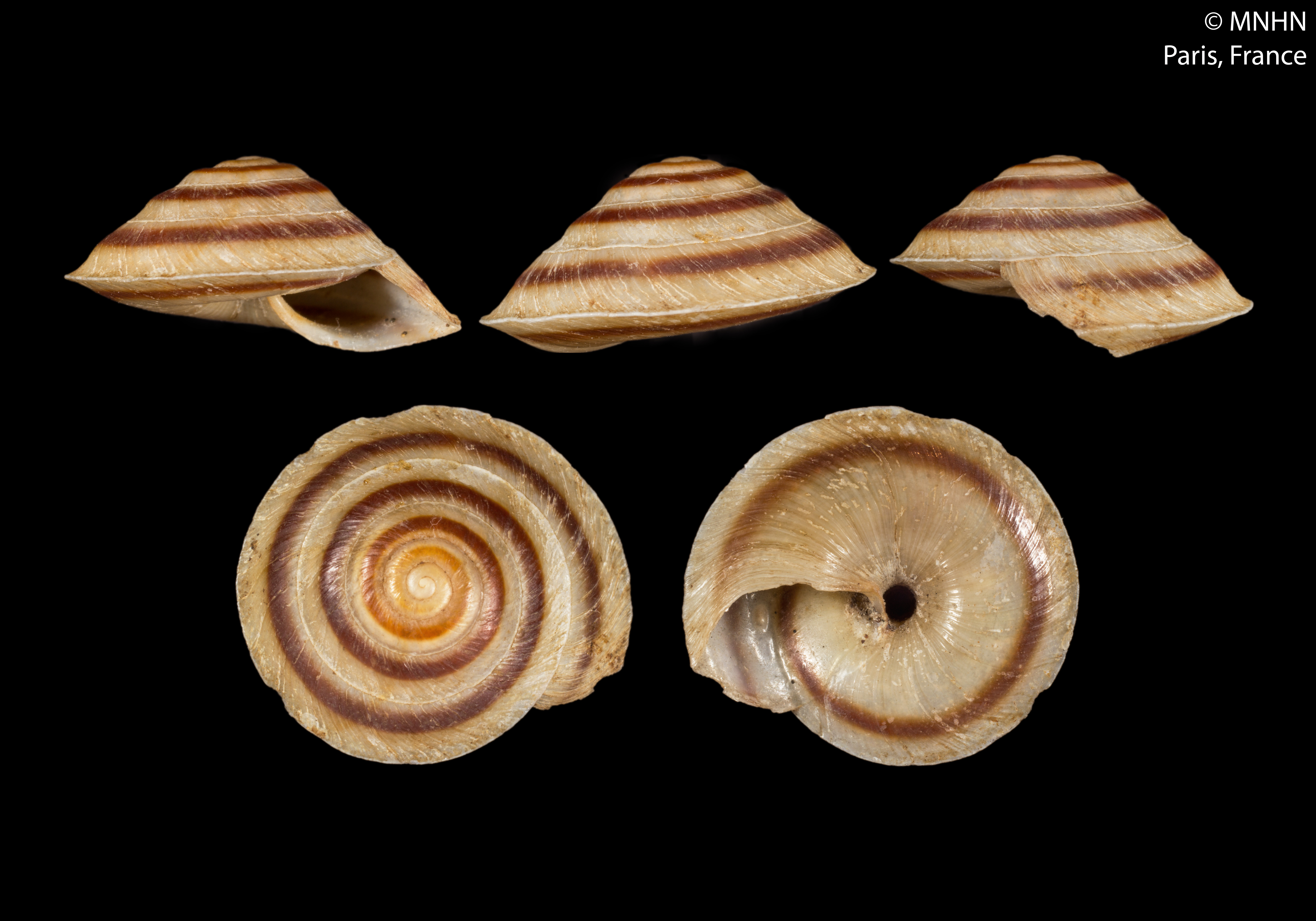
- Shell of Trochomorpha apia (syntype at MNHN, Paris)

Conservation status
- Endangered (IUCN 2.3)

Scientific classification
- Kingdom: Animalia
- Phylum: Mollusca
- Class: Gastropoda
- Order: Stylommatophora
- Family: Trochomorphidae
- Genus: Trochomorpha
- Species: T. apia

Binomial name
- Trochomorpha apia (Hombron & Jacquinot, 1852)

Synonyms
- Helix apia Hombron & Jacquinot, 1847 (original combination); Trochomorpha (Ludificator) apia (Hombron & Jacquinot, 1847) · alternate representation; Trochomorpha (Videna) subtrochiformis (Mousson, 1869) junior subjective synonym; Trochomorpha subtrochiformis Mousson, 1869 (junior synonym)

= Trochomorpha apia =

Species of gastropod

Trochomorpha apia is a species of air-breathing land snail, a terrestrial pulmonate gastropod mollusk in the family Trochomorphidae.

== Distribution ==
This species is endemic to American Samoa and Vanuatu.
