= Paravitrea clappi =

Conservation status
- Near Threatened (IUCN 2.3)

- Imperiled (NatureServe)

Scientific classification
- Kingdom: Animalia
- Phylum: Mollusca
- Class: Gastropoda
- Order: Stylommatophora
- Family: Pristilomatidae
- Genus: Paravitrea
- Species: P. clappi

Binomial name
- Paravitrea clappi (Pilsbry, 1898)

Species of gastropod

Paravitrea clappi is a species of land snail in the family Zonitidae, the true glass snails. It is known as the Mirey Ridge supercoil. This species is endemic to the United States, where it is known from the Great Smoky Mountains National Park in the Appalachian Mountains.
