= Probrazieria lutaria =

Conservation status
- Data Deficient (IUCN 2.3)

Scientific classification
- Kingdom: Animalia
- Phylum: Mollusca
- Class: Gastropoda
- Order: Stylommatophora
- Family: Trochomorphidae
- Genus: Probrazieria
- Species: P. lutaria

Binomial name
- Probrazieria lutaria (H. B. Baker, 1941)

Synonyms
- Brazieria (Probrazieria) lutaria H. B. Baker, 1941; Brazieria lutaria H. B. Baker, 1941

Species of gastropod

Probrazieria lutaria is a species of air-breathing land snails, terrestrial pulmonate gastropod mollusks in the family Trochomorphidae.

This species is endemic to the Caroline Islands, Micronesia. It was listed as Vulnerable in 1994 until changing to Data Deficient in 1996.
