= Hogolua =

Scientific classification
- Kingdom: Animalia
- Phylum: Mollusca
- Class: Gastropoda
- Order: Stylommatophora
- Family: Zonitidae
- Genus: Hogolua; Baker, 1941

Genus of gastropods

Hogolua is a genus of air-breathing land snails, terrestrial pulmonate gastropod mollusks in the family Zonitidae. Some authors place this genus in the family Trochomorphidae instead.

This genus name has sometimes mistakenly been written as "Hongolua" and even "Hoglua".

== Species ==
Species within the genus Hongolua include:

- Hogolua kondorum
