= Glyphyalinia pecki =

Conservation status
- Data Deficient (IUCN 2.3)

- Critically Imperiled (NatureServe)

Scientific classification
- Kingdom: Animalia
- Phylum: Mollusca
- Class: Gastropoda
- Order: Stylommatophora
- Family: Zonitidae
- Genus: Glyphyalinia
- Species: G. pecki

Binomial name
- Glyphyalinia pecki Hubricht, 1966

Species of gastropod

Glyphyalinia pecki is a species of air-breathing land snails, terrestrial pulmonate gastropod mollusks in the family Zonitidae. This species is endemic to the United States.
