= Trochomorpha melvillensis =

Conservation status
- Near Threatened (IUCN 2.3)

Scientific classification
- Kingdom: Animalia
- Phylum: Mollusca
- Class: Gastropoda
- Order: Stylommatophora
- Family: Trochomorphidae
- Genus: Trochomorpha
- Species: T. melvillensis

Binomial name
- Trochomorpha melvillensis Solem, 1989

Species of gastropod

Trochomorpha melvillensis is a species of land snail in the family Trochomorphidae. It is endemic to Australia, where it is known only from Melville Island off the coast of the Northern Territory.

This snail is about 1 to 1.2 centimeters wide. It has a sharp keel along the curve of its shell and a red band along the coil. It lives under logs in coastal rainforest habitat. It has been found at only a few locations.
