= Hogolua kondorum =

Conservation status
- Data Deficient (IUCN 2.3)

Scientific classification
- Kingdom: Animalia
- Phylum: Mollusca
- Class: Gastropoda
- Order: Stylommatophora
- Family: Zonitidae
- Genus: Hogolua
- Species: H. kondorum

Binomial name
- Hogolua kondorum Baker, 1941

Species of gastropod

Hogolua kondorum is a minute species of air-breathing land snails, terrestrial pulmonate gastropod mollusks in the family Zonitidae.

This species is endemic to Micronesia.
