= Kondoa =

Kondoa may refer to:

- Kondoa Mjini, a ward in Tanzania
- Kondoa District, in Tanzania
- Kondoa (gastropod), a genus of land snails
- Kondoa (fungus), the type genus of the Kondoaceae family
