= Probrazieria =

Scientific classification
- Kingdom: Animalia
- Phylum: Mollusca
- Class: Gastropoda
- Order: Stylommatophora
- Family: Trochomorphidae
- Genus: Probrazieria; H. B. Baker, 1941

Synonyms
- Brazieria (Probrazieria) H. B. Baker, 1941 (original rank)

Genus of gastropods

Probrazieria is a genus of air-breathing land snails, terrestrial pulmonate gastropod mollusks in the family Trochomorphidae.

== Species ==
Species within the genus Probrazieria include:

- Probrazieria lutaria (H. B. Baker, 1941)
