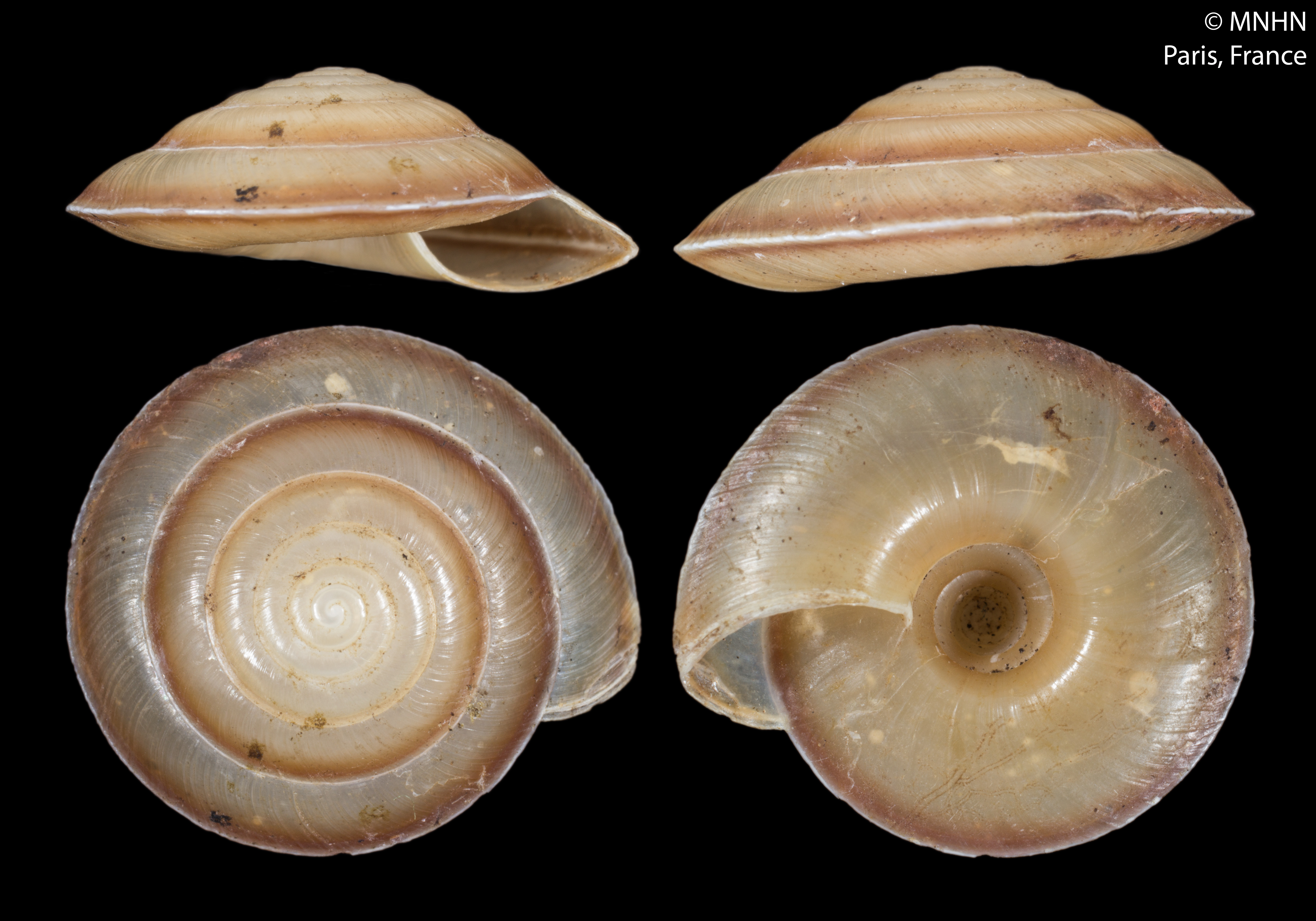
- Shell of Geotrochus subtricolor (syntype at MNHN, Paris)

Scientific classification
- Kingdom: Animalia
- Phylum: Mollusca
- Class: Gastropoda
- Order: Stylommatophora
- Family: Trochomorphidae
- Genus: Geotrochus van Hasselt, 1823

Type species
- Helix conus L. Pfeiffer, 1841

Synonyms
- Chiroktisma Gude, 1913; Helix (Geostrochus) van Hasselt, 1823 (incorrect subsequent spelling); Helix (Geotrochus) van Hasselt, 1823

= Geotrochus =

Genus of gastropods

Geotrochus is a genus of air-breathing land snails, terrestrial pulmonate gastropod mollusks in the family Trochomorphidae.

== General characteristics ==
The shell has a trochiform shape and is an imperforate structure. The whorls are flattened. The upper surface is covered with numerous raised spiral lirae. Conversely, the lower surface is shining and is finely striated transversely. Finally, the margins of the aperture are acute, and they are not reflexed.

== Species ==
Species within the genus Geotrochus include:

- Geotrochus affinis (E. A. Smith, 1894)
- Geotrochus bicolor (Martens, 1864)
- Geotrochus conicoides (Metcalfe, 1851)
- Geotrochus conus (L. Pfeiffer, 1841)
- Geotrochus kinabaluensis (E. A. Smith, 1895)
- Geotrochus kitteli Vermeulen, Liew & Schilthuizen, 2015
- Geotrochus labuanensis (L. Pfeiffer, 1864)
- Geotrochus meristotrochus Vermeulen, Liew & Schilthuizen, 2015
- Geotrochus multicarinatus (Boettger, 1890)
- Geotrochus niahensis (Godwin-Austen, 1891)
- Geotrochus oedobasis Vermeulen, Liew & Schilthuizen, 2015
- Geotrochus paraguensis (E. A. Smith, 1893)
- Geotrochus rimatus Vermeulen, 1997
- Geotrochus scolops Vermeulen, Liew & Schilthuizen, 2015
- Geotrochus spilokeiria Vermeulen, Liew & Schilthuizen, 2015
- Geotrochus subscalaris Vermeulen, Liew & Schilthuizen, 2015
- Geotrochus subtricolor (Mabille, 1887)
- Geotrochus sylvanus (Dohrn & C. Semper, 1862)
- Geotrochus verticillatus van Benthem Jutting, 1959
- Geotrochus whiteheadi (E. A. Smith, 1895)
- † Geotrochus xinanensis Yü & Zhang, 1982
