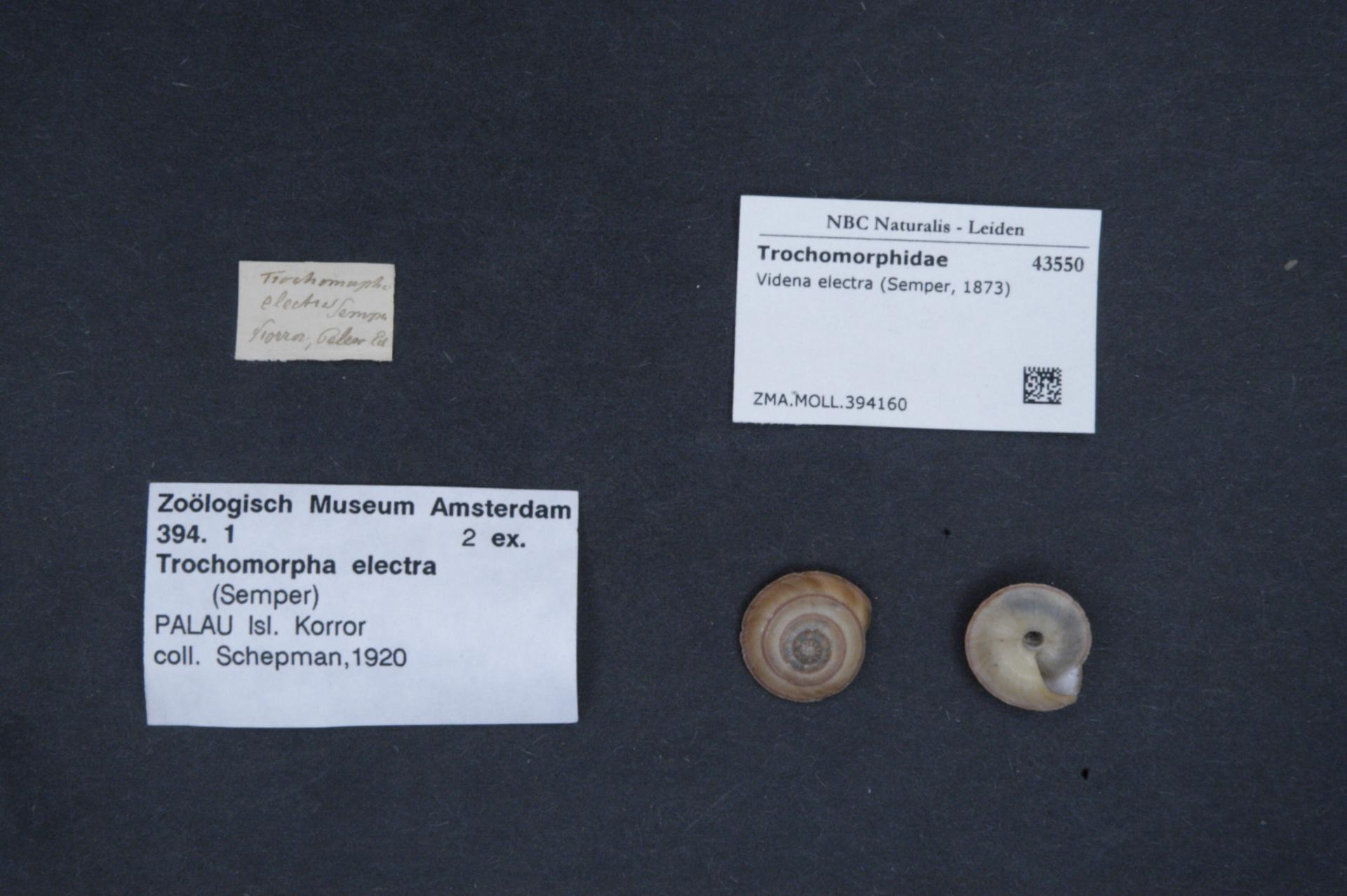
- Shell of Videna electra (specimen at Naturalis Biodiversity Center)

Conservation status
- Vulnerable (IUCN 3.1)

Scientific classification
- Kingdom: Animalia
- Phylum: Mollusca
- Class: Gastropoda
- Order: Stylommatophora
- Family: Trochomorphidae
- Genus: Videna
- Species: V. electra

Binomial name
- Videna electra (C. Semper, 1873)

= Videna electra =

Species of gastropod

Videna electra is a species of terrestrial pulmonate gastropod mollusk in the family Trochomorphidae.

This species is endemic to Palau.
