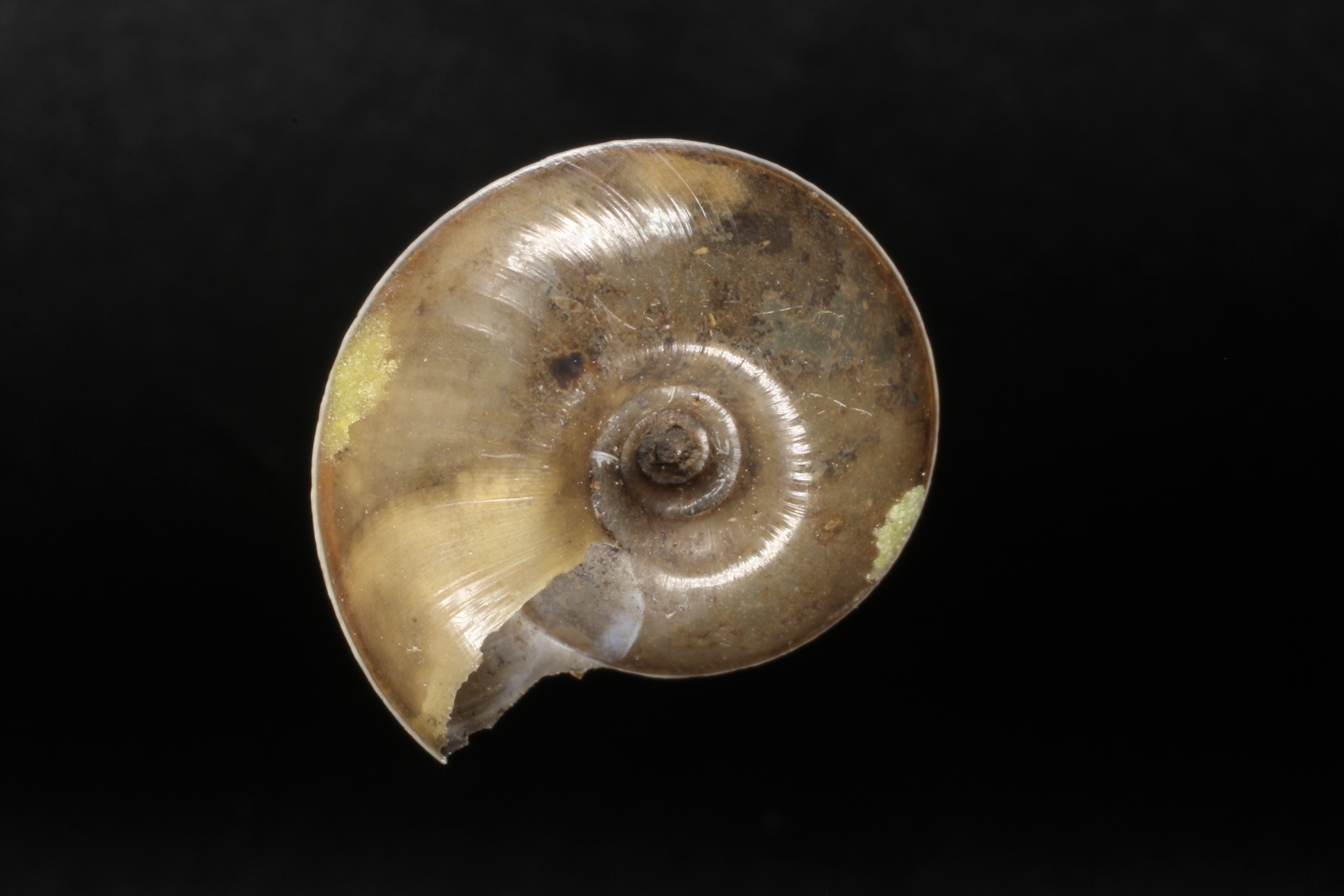
- Shell of Videna abbasi (holotype at MNHN, Paris)

Scientific classification
- Kingdom: Animalia
- Phylum: Mollusca
- Class: Gastropoda
- Order: Stylommatophora
- Infraorder: Limacoidei
- Superfamily: Trochomorphoidea
- Family: Trochomorphidae
- Genus: Videna; H. Adams & A. Adams, 1855

Type species
- Helix metcalfii L. Pfeiffer, 1845

Synonyms
- Disculus Schaufuss, 1869 (nom. nov. pro Discus Albers, 1850, non Fitzinger, 1833. Invalid: junior homonym of Disculus Deshayes, 1863 [Architectonicidae]); Discus Albers, 1850; Helix (Discus) Albers, 1850 (invalid: junior homonym of Discus Fitzinger, 1833; Disculus and Videna are replacement names); Helix (Videna) H. Adams & A. Adams, 1855; Nanina (Videna) H. Adams & A. Adams, 1855; Trochomorpha (Videna) H. Adams & A. Adams, 1855; Zonites (Videna) H. Adams & A. Adams, 1855 (original rank)

= Videna =

Genus of gastropods

Videna is a genus of terrestrial pulmonate gastropod mollusks in the family Trochomorphidae.

Members of this genus are found in Southeast Asia from India into South Korea, China, and into the Pacific islands. Videna have large, umbilicate, planispiral shells with the body of the snail visible through the shell.

== Species ==
Species within the genus Videna include:

- Videna abbasi Thach, 2020
- Videna albocincta (L. Pfeiffer, 1846)
- Videna alticola (Möllendorff, 1894)
- Videna andamanica (Godwin-Austen, 1895)
- Videna boettgeri (Mollendorf, 1890)
- Videna boholensis (C. Semper, 1873)
- Videna cantoriana (Benson, 1861)
- Videna crassicarinata (Fulton, 1907)
- Videna crassula (Möllendorff, 1898)
- Videna electra (C. Semper, 1873)
- Videna frauenfeldi (L. Pfeiffer & Zelebor, 1867)
- Videna gracilis (Möllendorff, 1894)
- Videna grubaueri (Möllendorff, 1902)
- Videna infanda (C. Semper, 1873)
- Videna intermedia (Möllendorff, 1894)
- Videna iopharynx (Mörch, 1876)
- Videna kelantanensis (Möllendorff, 1902)
- Videna lardea (Martens, 1864)
- Videna metcalfii (L. Pfeiffer, 1845)
- Videna minahassae (P. Sarasin & F. Sarasin, 1899)
- Videna modesta (Fulton, 1907)
- Videna neglecta (Pilsbry, 1892)
- Videna niasensis (Fulton, 1907)
- Videna nitidella (Möllendorff, 1898)
- Videna pseudosanis (Fulton, 1897)
- Videna quadrasi (Hidalgo, 1890)
- Videna repanda (Möllendorff, 1890)
- Videna sanis (Benson, 1861)
- Videna schmackeri (Möllendorff, 1894)
- Videna sculpticarina (Martens, 1883)
- Videna sibuyanica (Hidalgo, 1887)
- Videna subnigritella (Beddome, 1891)
- Videna sulcipes (Mörch, 1872)
- Videna timorensis (Martens, 1867)
- Videna trilineata (Mörch, 1876)

Species brought into synonymy

- Videna bicolor (E. von Martens, 1864): synonym of Geotrochus bicolor (E. von Martens, 1864) (unaccepted combination)
- Videna castra (W. H. Benson, 1852): synonym of Sivella castra (W. H. Benson, 1852)
- Videna oleacina: synonym of Peleliua oleacina (C. Semper, 1873)
- Videna pagodula: synonym of Peleliua pagodula (Semper, 1873)
- Videna planorbis (Lesson, 1831): synonym of Trochomorpha froggatti (Iredale, 1941) (based on unavailable original name (Helix planorbis Lesson, 1831 not Linnaeus, 1758))
- Videna pumila H. B. Baker, 1941: synonym of Peleliua pumila (H. B. Baker, 1941) (original combination)
