= Doraegopis =

Scientific classification
- Domain: Eukaryota
- Kingdom: Animalia
- Phylum: Mollusca
- Class: Gastropoda
- Order: Stylommatophora
- Family: Zonitidae
- Genus: Doraegopis; Riedel, 1982

Genus of molluscs

Doraegopis is a genus of gastropods belonging to the family Zonitidae.

The species of this genus are found in Greece.

Species:

- Doraegopis boeoticus (Riedel, 1980)
- Doraegopis carinatus Gittenberger, 1999
- Doraegopis euboeicus Bank & Menkhorst, 1988
- Doraegopis parnonicus Riedel, 1982
- Doraegopis subaii Riedel, 1990
