= Theskelomensor =

Scientific classification
- Kingdom: Animalia
- Phylum: Mollusca
- Class: Gastropoda
- Order: Stylommatophora
- Family: Trochomorphidae
- Genus: Theskelomensor; Iredale, 1933

Genus of gastropods

Theskelomensor is a genus of air-breathing land snails, terrestrial pulmonate gastropod mollusks in the family Trochomorphidae.

== Species ==
The following species are recognised in the genus Theskelomensor:

- Theskelomensor creon
- Theskelomensor lizardensis
