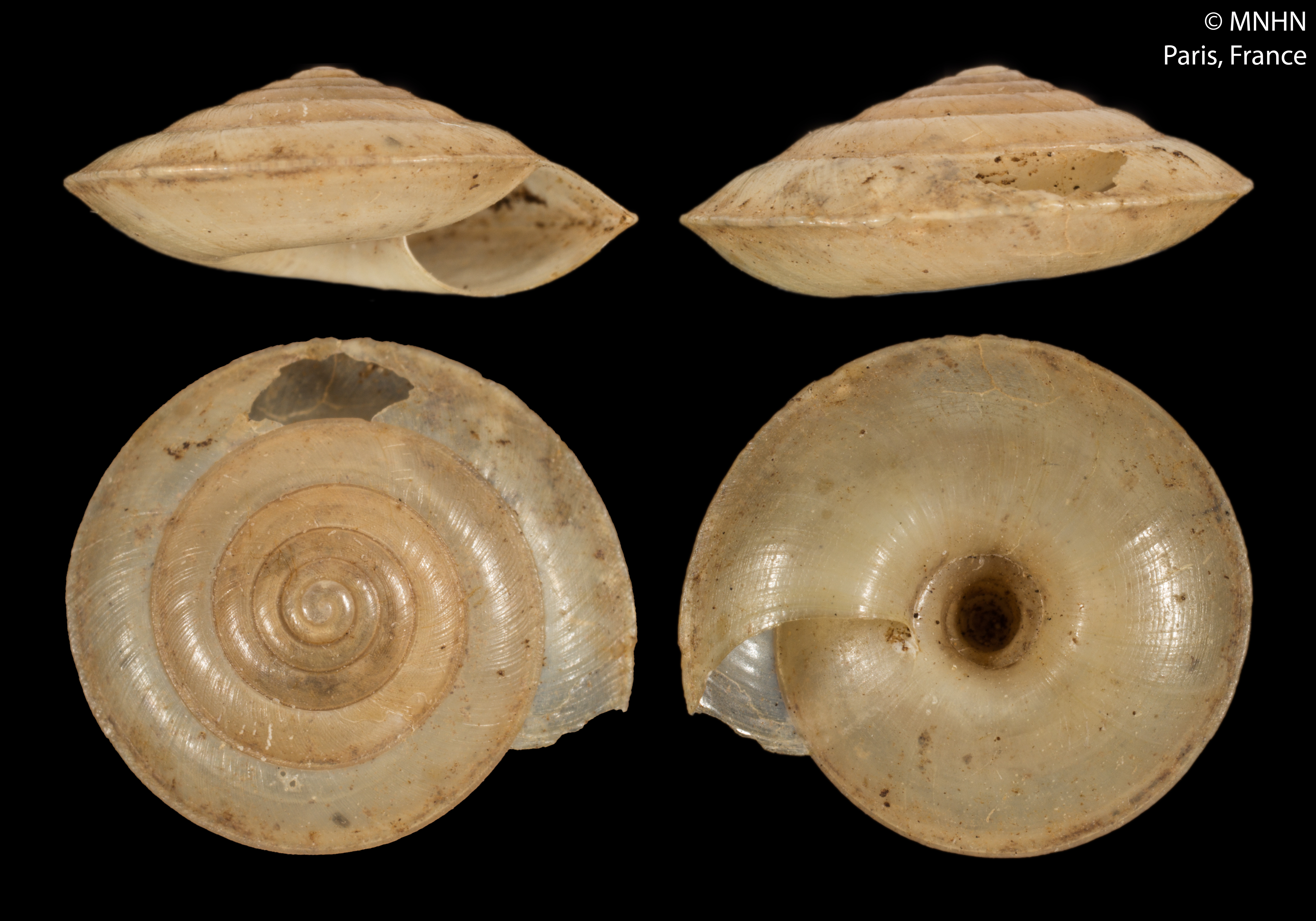
- Shell of Trochomorpha saigonensis (syntype at MNHN, Paris)

Scientific classification
- Kingdom: Animalia
- Phylum: Mollusca
- Class: Gastropoda
- Order: Stylommatophora
- Infraorder: Limacoidei
- Superfamily: Trochomorphoidea
- Family: Trochomorphidae
- Genus: Trochomorpha; Albers, 1850

Type species
- Helix trochiformis L. Pfeiffer, 1842

Species
- See text

Synonyms
- Helix (Trochomorpha) Albers, 1850 (original rank); Nanina (Nigritella) E. von Martens, 1860 superseded combination; Nanina (Trochomorpha) Albers, 1850; Necvidena Iredale, 1941 (junior synonym); Rosselidena Iredale, 1941 (original rank); Trochomorpha (Cotitrochus) H. B. Baker, 1941· accepted, alternate representation; Trochomorpha (Discus) Albers, 1850 superseded combination; Trochomorpha (Discus) transarata (Mousson, 1865) superseded combination; Trochomorpha (Hartmanitrochus) Solem, 1959· accepted, alternate representation; Trochomorpha (Lauhala) H. B. Baker, 1941· accepted, alternate representation; Trochomorpha (Lentitrochus) H. B. Baker, 1941· accepted, alternate representation; Trochomorpha (Ludificator) H. B. Baker, 1941· accepted, alternate representation; Trochomorpha (Nigritella) E. von Martens, 1860 · alternate representation; Trochomorpha (Rosselidena) Iredale, 1941· accepted, alternate representation; Trochomorpha (Trochomorpha) Albers, 1850 · alternate representation

= Trochomorpha =

Genus of gastropods

Trochomorpha is a genus of air-breathing land snails, terrestrial pulmonate gastropod mollusks in the family Trochomorphidae.

== Species ==
Species within the genus Trochomorpha include:

- Trochomorpha abrochroa (Crosse, 1868)
- Trochomorpha accurata Mousson, 1870
- Trochomorpha albostriata Mousson, 1870
- Trochomorpha apia (Hombron & Jacquinot, 1852)
- Trochomorpha apicis B. Rensch, 1931
- Trochomorpha approximata (Le Guillou, 1842)
- Trochomorpha assimilis Garrett, 1884
- Trochomorpha aukiensis Clapp, 1923
- Trochomorpha backhuysi Delsaerdt, 2016
- Trochomorpha beckiana (L. Pfeiffer, 1842)
- Trochomorpha belmorei (Cox, 1872)
- Trochomorpha benigna (L. Pfeiffer, 1863)
- Trochomorpha borealis Möllendorff, 1888
- Trochomorpha burrowsi H. B. Baker, 1941
- Trochomorpha carolinae H. B. Baker, 1941
- Trochomorpha ceroconus (L. Pfeiffer, 1864)
- Trochomorpha concava Clapp, 1923
- Trochomorpha concolor O. Boettger, 1890
- Trochomorpha conoides H. B. Baker, 1941
- Trochomorpha contigua Pease, 1871
- Trochomorpha corallina Mousson, 1870
- Trochomorpha cornea Hedley, 1891
- Trochomorpha corneofusca I. Rensch & B. Rensch, 1929: synonym of Trochomorpha mejmi corneofusca I. Rensch & B. Rensch, 1929
- Trochomorpha cressida (A. Gould, 1846)
- Trochomorpha crustulum (Cox, 1873)
- Trochomorpha dautzenbergi Sykes, 1904
- Trochomorpha deiopeia (Angas, 1869)
- Trochomorpha depressostriata Mousson, 1870
- Trochomorpha discrepans van Benthem Jutting, 1964
- Trochomorpha dondani Thach & F. Huber, 2021
- Trochomorpha eurydice (A. Gould, 1846)
- Trochomorpha exaltata (L. Pfeiffer, 1855)
- Trochomorpha exclusa (Quoy & Gaimard, 1825)
- Trochomorpha fatigata (Cox, 1873)
- Trochomorpha fessonia (Angas, 1869)
- Trochomorpha flava Clapp, 1923
- Trochomorpha froggatti (Iredale, 1941)
- Trochomorpha godeti G. B. Sowerby III, 1890
- Trochomorpha gulielmi Sykes, 1904
- Trochomorpha haptoderma Vermeulen, Liew & Schilthuizen, 2015
- Trochomorpha henschei (L. Pfeiffer, 1867)
- Trochomorpha hidalgoiana (Crosse, 1864)
- Trochomorpha huberi Thach, 2018
- Trochomorpha jampeana E. A. Smith, 1896
- Trochomorpha johnabbasi Thach, 2021
- Trochomorpha juanita (Angas, 1873)
- Trochomorpha kambarae H. B. Baker, 1941
- Trochomorpha kantavuensis Garrett, 1887
- Trochomorpha kierulfi (Mörch, 1850)
- Trochomorpha kuesteri (L. Pfeiffer, 1845)
- Trochomorpha latimarginata (E. A. Smith, 1884)
- Trochomorpha lofti Delsaerdt, 2016
- Trochomorpha ludersi (L. Pfeiffer, 1855)
- Trochomorpha luteocornea (Reeve, 1854)
- Trochomorpha manni Clapp, 1923
- Trochomorpha matura (L. Pfeiffer, 1855)
- Trochomorpha mcleani Clench, 1958
- Trochomorpha mejmi (Leschke, 1912)
- Trochomorpha meleagris (L. Pfeiffer, 1855)
- Trochomorpha melvillensis Solem, 1988
- Trochomorpha membranicosta (L. Pfeiffer, 1854)
- Trochomorpha merziana (L. Pfeiffer, 1853)
- Trochomorpha merzianoides (Garrett, 1873)
- Trochomorpha moalensis H. B. Baker, 1941
- Trochomorpha morio Tapparone Canefri, 1886
- Trochomorpha neuhausi I. Rensch, 1930
- Trochomorpha nigrans E. A. Smith, 1889
- Trochomorpha nigritella (L. Pfeiffer, 1847)
- Trochomorpha ottonis I. Rensch, 1930
- Trochomorpha pallens Pease, 1871
- Trochomorpha papua (Lesson, 1831)
- Trochomorpha partunda Angas, 1868
- Trochomorpha patrium I. Rensch & B. Rensch, 1929
- Trochomorpha patulaeformis I. Rensch & B. Rensch, 1929
- Trochomorpha paviei (Morlet, 1885)
- Trochomorpha percompressa (W. T. Blanford, 1869)
- Trochomorpha planoconus Garrett, 1887
- Trochomorpha rhoda (Angas, 1876)
- Trochomorpha rhysa Tillier & Bouchet, 1989
- Trochomorpha robusta P. Sarasin & F. Sarasin, 1899
- Trochomorpha rubens W. D. Hartman, 1888
- Trochomorpha saigonensis (Crosse, 1867)
- Trochomorpha samoa (Hombron & Jacquinot, 1841)
- Trochomorpha sanctaeannae (E. A. Smith, 1885)
- Trochomorpha sapeca (Heude, 1890)
- Trochomorpha scytodes (L. Pfeiffer, 1854)
- Trochomorpha serena (Cox, 1873)
- Trochomorpha solarium (Quoy & Gaimard, 1832)
- Trochomorpha strubelli O. Boettger, 1890
- Trochomorpha swainsoni (L. Pfeiffer, 1846)
- Trochomorpha synoecia Möllendorff, 1891
- Trochomorpha tavinniensis (Garrett, 1872)
- Trochomorpha tentoriolum (Gould, 1846)
- Trochomorpha ternatana (Le Guillou, 1842)
- Trochomorpha tertia I. Rensch & B. Rensch, 1929: synonym of Trochomorpha mejmi tertia I. Rensch & B. Rensch, 1929 (original rank)
- Trochomorpha thachi F. Huber, 2020
- Trochomorpha thelecoryphe Vermeulen, Liew & Schilthuizen, 2015
- Trochomorpha trachus Vermeulen, Liew & Schilthuizen, 2015
- Trochomorpha transarata (Mousson, 1865)
- Trochomorpha troilus (Gould, 1846)
- Trochomorpha tuber Mousson, 1869
- Trochomorpha tumulus (A. Gould, 1846)
- Trochomorpha tuvuthae H. B. Baker, 1941
- Trochomorpha typus H. B. Baker, 1941
- Trochomorpha unica I. Rensch & B. Rensch, 1935
- Trochomorpha vanderrieti Clench, 1965
- Trochomorpha vestersi I. Rensch & B. Rensch, 1929
- Trochomorpha vicdani Thach & F. Huber, 2021
- Trochomorpha vincekessneri Thach, 2021
- Trochomorpha xiphias (L. Pfeiffer, 1856)
- Trochomorpha zenobia (L. Pfeiffer, 1864)
- Trochomorpha zenobiella Clapp, 1923

Taxa inquirenda

- Trochomorpha hartmanni (L. Pfeiffer, 1846)
