= Turcozonites =

Scientific classification
- Domain: Eukaryota
- Kingdom: Animalia
- Phylum: Mollusca
- Class: Gastropoda
- Order: Stylommatophora
- Family: Zonitidae
- Genus: Turcozonites; Riedel, 1987

Genus of molluscs

Turcozonites is a genus of gastropods belonging to the family Zonitidae.

The species of this genus are found in Eastern Mediterranean.

Species:

- Turcozonites anamurensis Neubert & Riedel, 1995
- Turcozonites corax (Pfeiffer, 1857)
- Turcozonites insignis (Nägele, 1903)
- Turcozonites megistus (Rolle, 1894)
- Turcozonites piratarum (Riedel, 1987)
- Turcozonites silifkeensis Menkhorst & Riedel, 1995
- Turcozonites wandae (Riedel, 1982)
