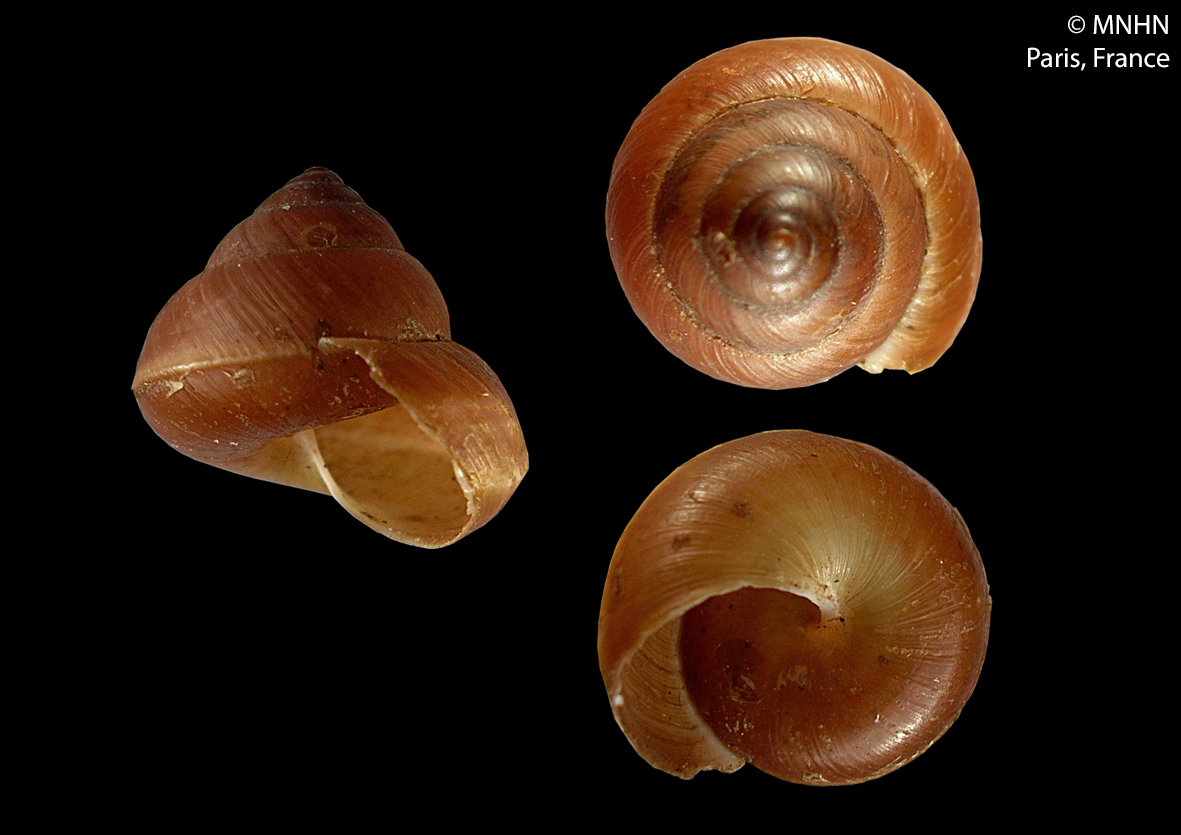
- Shell of Dendrotrochus cineraceus (specimen at MNHN, Paris)

Scientific classification
- Kingdom: Animalia
- Phylum: Mollusca
- Class: Gastropoda
- Order: Stylommatophora
- Family: Trochomorphidae
- Genus: Dendrotrochus; Pilsbry, 1894

Type species
- Helix helicinoides L. Pfeiffer, 1849

Synonyms
- Dendrotrochus (Dendrotrochus) Pilsbry, 1894· accepted, alternate representation; Dendrotrochus (Santotrochus) Solem, 1959· accepted, alternate representation; Papuina (Dendrotrochus) Pilsbry, 1894 (original rank)

= Dendrotrochus =

Genus of gastropods

Dendrotrochus is a genus of small air-breathing land snails, terrestrial pulmonate gastropod mollusks in the family Trochomorphidae, the hive snails.

== Species ==
Species within the genus Dendrotrochus include:

- Dendrotrochus arrowensis (Le Guillou, 1842)
- Dendrotrochus cineraceus (Hombron & Jacquinot, 1841)
- Dendrotrochus coultasi Clench, 1957
- Dendrotrochus dahli Thiele, 1928
- Dendrotrochus helicinoides (L. Pfeiffer, 1849)
- Dendrotrochus huberi Thach, 2020
- Dendrotrochus kraemeri Thiele, 1928
- Dendrotrochus layardi (Hartman, 1889)
- Dendrotrochus leucotropis (Pfeiffer, 1861)
- Dendrotrochus mentum Hedley, 1899
- Dendrotrochus stramineus Sykes, 1903
- Dendrotrochus thachi F. Huber, 2020

Species brought into synonymy

- Dendrotrochus labillardierei (E. A. Smith, 1884): synonym of Dendrotrochus helicinoides labillardierei (E. A. Smith, 1884)
- Dendrotrochus ponapensis H. B. Baker, 1941: synonym of Ponapea ponapensis (H. B. Baker, 1941) (original combination)
