= Meledella =

Scientific classification
- Kingdom: Animalia
- Phylum: Mollusca
- Class: Gastropoda
- Order: Stylommatophora
- Family: Zonitidae
- Genus: Meledella; Sturany, 1908
- Species: M. werneri

Binomial name
- Meledella werneri Sturany, 1908

Genus of land snails

Meledella is a monotypic genus of gastropods belonging to the family Zonitidae. The only species is Meledella werneri.

The species inhabits terrestrial environments.
