= Ponapea ponapensis =

Conservation status
- Data Deficient (IUCN 2.3)

Scientific classification
- Kingdom: Animalia
- Phylum: Mollusca
- Class: Gastropoda
- Order: Stylommatophora
- Family: Chronidae
- Genus: Ponapea
- Species: P. ponapensis

Binomial name
- Ponapea ponapensis (H. B. Baker, 1941)

Synonyms
- Dendrotrochus (Ponapea) ponapensis H. B. Baker, 1941; Dendrotrochus ponapensis H. B. Baker, 1941

Species of gastropod

Ponapea ponapensis, formerly Dendrotrochus ponapensis, is a species of small air-breathing land snails, terrestrial pulmonate gastropod mollusks in the family Euconulidae, the hive snails. This species is endemic to Micronesia.
