= Brazieria =

Scientific classification
- Domain: Eukaryota
- Kingdom: Animalia
- Phylum: Mollusca
- Class: Gastropoda
- Order: Stylommatophora
- Family: Trochomorphidae
- Genus: Brazieria; Ancey, 1887

Synonyms
- Brazieria (Brazieria) Ancey, 1887· accepted, alternate representation; Brazieria (Brazieriella) H. B. Baker, 1941; Helix (Brazieria) Ancey, 1887 (superseded combination)

Genus of gastropods

Brazieria is a genus of air-breathing land snails, terrestrial pulmonate gastropod mollusks in the family Trochomorphidae.

== Species ==
Species within the genus Brazieria include:

- Brazieria erasa H. B. Baker, 1941
- Brazieria minuscula H. B. Baker, 1941
- Brazieria obesa H. B. Baker, 1941
- Brazieria velata (Hombron & Jacquinot, 1841)

Species brought into synonymy

- Brazieria entomostoma(Hombron & Jacquinot, 1841): synonym of Entomostoma entomostoma (Hombron & Jacquinot, 1841)
- Brazieria lutariaH. B. Baker, 1941 : synonym of Probrazieria lutaria (H. B. Baker, 1941) (original combination)
