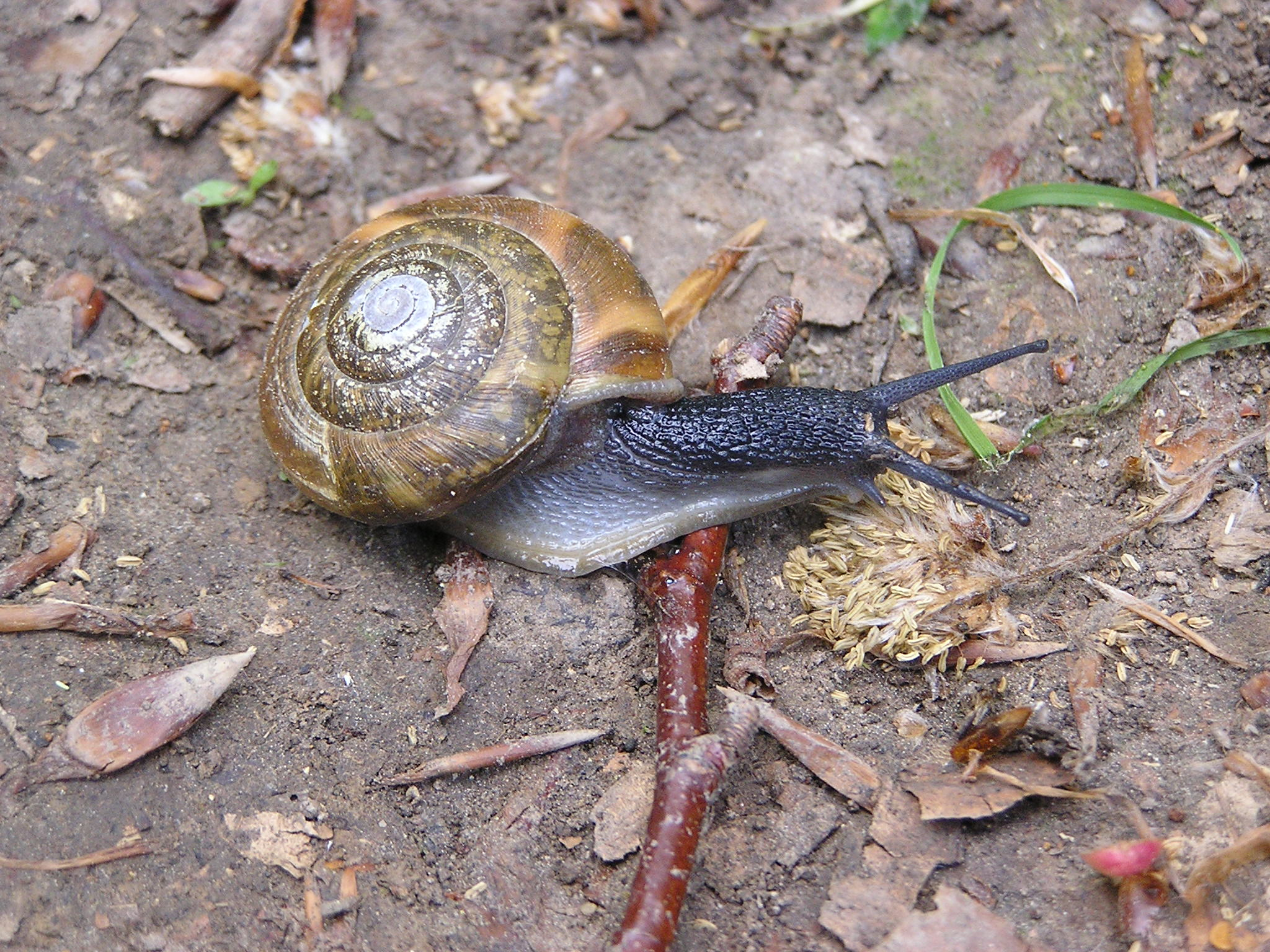
- A live individual of Aegopis verticillus

Scientific classification
- Domain: Eukaryota
- Kingdom: Animalia
- Phylum: Mollusca
- Class: Gastropoda
- Order: Stylommatophora
- Family: Zonitidae
- Genus: Aegopis; Fitzinger, 1833

Species
- See text

= Aegopis =

Genus of gastropods

Aegopis is a genus of air-breathing land snails, terrestrial pulmonate gastropod mollusks in the family Zonitidae, the true glass snails.

== Species ==
Species within the genus Aegopis include:

- Aegopis verticillus
- Aegopis acies
