= Allaegopis =

Scientific classification
- Domain: Eukaryota
- Kingdom: Animalia
- Phylum: Mollusca
- Class: Gastropoda
- Order: Stylommatophora
- Family: Zonitidae
- Genus: Allaegopis; Riedel, 1979

Genus of molluscs

Allaegopis is a genus of gastropods belonging to the family Zonitidae.

The species of this genus are found in Greece.

Species:

- Allaegopis amphikypellon A.Riedel, 1982
- Allaegopis corcyrensis (O.Boettger, 1883)
- Allaegopis jonicus (Käufel, 1930)
- Allaegopis kerketianus A.Riedel, 1993
- Allaegopis meridionalis A.Riedel, 1986
- Allaegopis skanderbegianus (Poliński, 1924)
- Allaegopis subariedeli E.Gittenberger, 1999
- Allaegopis transiens (Mousson, 1859)
