= Troglaegopis =

Scientific classification
- Domain: Eukaryota
- Kingdom: Animalia
- Phylum: Mollusca
- Class: Gastropoda
- Order: Stylommatophora
- Family: Zonitidae
- Genus: Troglaegopis; Riedel & Radja, 1983
- Species: T. mosorensis

Binomial name
- Troglaegopis mosorensis (Kuščer, 1933)

Genus of molluscs

Troglaegopis is a monotypic genus of gastropods belonging to the family Zonitidae. The only species is Troglaegopis mosorensis.

The species is found in Europe.
