= Balcanodiscus =

Scientific classification
- Domain: Eukaryota
- Kingdom: Animalia
- Phylum: Mollusca
- Class: Gastropoda
- Order: Stylommatophora
- Family: Zonitidae
- Genus: Balcanodiscus; Riedel & Urbański, 1964

Genus of molluscs

Balcanodiscus is a genus of gastropods belonging to the family Zonitidae.

The species of this genus are found in Greece.

Species:

- Balcanodiscus beroni A.Riedel, 1995
- Balcanodiscus carinatus P.L.Reischütz, 1983
- Balcanodiscus cerberus A.Riedel, 1985
- Balcanodiscus danyii Erőss, Fehér & Páll-Gergely, 2011
- Balcanodiscus difficilis A.Riedel, 1988
- Balcanodiscus frivaldskyanus (Rossmässler, 1842)
- Balcanodiscus magnus P.L.Reischütz, 1988
- Balcanodiscus mirus A.Reischütz, N.Steiner-Reischütz & P.L.Reischütz, 2016
- Balcanodiscus stummerorum A.Reischütz, P.L.Reischütz & W.Fischer, 2008
