= Paraegopis =

Scientific classification
- Kingdom: Animalia
- Phylum: Mollusca
- Class: Gastropoda
- Order: Stylommatophora
- Family: Zonitidae
- Genus: Paraegopis; Hesse, 1910

Genus of molluscs

Paraegopis is a genus of gastropods belonging to the family Zonitidae.

The species of this genus are found in the Balkans.

Species:

- Paraegopis albanicus (Rossmässler, 1836)
- Paraegopis bizonus Wagner, 1914
- Paraegopis mauritii (Westerlund, 1886)
- Paraegopis oberwimmeri Klemm, 1965
- Paraegopis skipetaricus Wagner, 1914
