= Ogaridiscus =

Scientific classification
- Kingdom: Animalia
- Phylum: Mollusca
- Class: Gastropoda
- Order: Stylommatophora
- Family: Zonitidae
- Genus: Ogaridiscus; Dall, 1877

Species
- See text

Genus of molluscs

Ogaridiscus is a genus of air-breathing land snails, terrestrial pulmonate gastropod mollusks in the family Zonitidae.

== Species ==
Only one species—with no subspecies—is listed in the Catalog of Life:

- Ogaridiscus subrupicola
