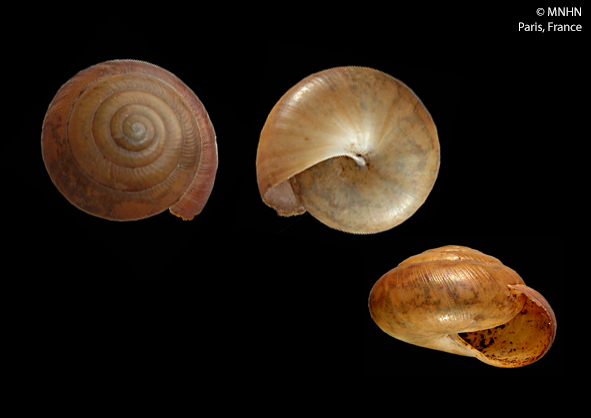
- Shell of Orpiella keppelli (specimen at MNHN, Paris)

Scientific classification
- Kingdom: Animalia
- Phylum: Mollusca
- Class: Gastropoda
- Order: Stylommatophora
- Infraorder: Limacoidei
- Superfamily: Trochomorphoidea
- Family: Trochomorphidae
- Genus: Orpiella; L. Pfeiffer & J. E. Gray, 1855

Type species
- Helix (Nanina) scorpio Gould, 1846

Synonyms
- Aulacopus Pfeffer, 1878; Eurypus C. Semper, 1870 (Invalid: junior homonym of Eurypus Kirby, 1819 [Coleoptera], Fretum Sykes, 1900 is a replacement name); Fretum Sykes, 1900; Kalendyma Gude, 1911 (junior synonym); Orpiella (Fijia) Gude, 1913· accepted, alternate representation; Orpiella (Halozonites) H. B. Baker, 1941· accepted, alternate representation; Orpiella (Kalendyma) Gude, 1911 (junior synonym); Orpiella (Orpiella) L. Pfeiffer & J. E. Gray, 1855· accepted, alternate representation; Orpiella (Owaraha) H. B. Baker, 1941· accepted, alternate representation; Owaraha H. B. Baker, 1941

= Orpiella =

Genus of gastropods

Orpiella is a genus of air-breathing land snails, terrestrial pulmonate gastropod mollusks in the family Trochomorphidae.

== Species ==
Species within the genus Orpiella include:

- Orpiella artensis (Souverbie, 1859)
- Orpiella compluviata (Cox, 1871)
- Orpiella concava (Clapp, 1923)
- Orpiella cookensis (Gude, 1905)
- Orpiella desmazuresi (Crosse, 1872)
- Orpiella fragillima (Mousson, 1870)
- Orpiella keppelli (L. Pfeiffer, 1855)
- Orpiella kuntzi Solem, 1960
- Orpiella lepida (Gude, 1913)
- Orpiella malaitaensis (Clapp, 1923)
- Orpiella manni (Clapp, 1923)
- Orpiella pamuaensis (Clapp, 1923)
- Orpiella proxima H. B. Baker, 1941
- Orpiella retardata (Cox, 1870)
- Orpiella salomonis (Vanatta, 1930)
- Orpiella schmeltziana (Garrett, 1887)
- Orpiella scorpio (Gould, 1846)
- Orpiella smithi (Clapp, 1923)
- Orpiella solidiuscula (E. A. Smith, 1885)
- Orpiella sororum (Clapp, 1923)
- Orpiella tenella (Garrett, 1872)
- Orpiella treasuryensis (Tryon, 1886)
- Orpiella woodwardi (Godwin-Austen, 1903)

Species brought into synonymy

- Orpiella casca (Gould, 1852): synonym of Orpiella scorpio (Gould, 1846) (junior synonym)
- Orpiella godeffroyana (Garrett, 1872): synonym of Irenella godeffroyana (Garrett, 1872) (superseded combination)
- Orpiella hoyti (Garrett, 1872): synonym of Irenella hoyti (Garrett, 1872) (superseded combination)
- Orpiella macgillivrayi (Gude, 1913): synonym of Fijia macgillivrayi Gude, 1913 (superseded combination)
- Orpiella nitidissima (E. A. Smith, 1885): synonym of Orpiella treasuryensis (Tryon, 1886) (junior secondary homonym replaced before 1961)
- Orpiella nouleti (Le Guillou, 1842): synonym of Irenella nouleti (Le Guillou, 1842) (superseded combination)
- Orpiella otarae (Garrett, 1872): synonym of Irenella otarae (Garrett, 1872) (superseded combination)
- Orpiella pfeifferi (Philippi, 1845): synonym of Irenella pfeifferi (Philippi, 1845) (superseded combination)
- Orpiella placita (Gude, 1913): synonym of Eufretum placita (Gude, 1913) (superseded combination)
- Orpiella plicostriata (Mousson, 1870): synonym of Fijia plicostriata (Mousson, 1870) (superseded combination)
- Orpiella ramsayi (Liardet, 1876): synonym of Eufretum ramsayi (Liardet, 1876) (superseded combination)
- Orpiella sorora [sic]: synonym of Orpiella sororum (Clapp, 1923) (misspelling)
