= Entomostoma =

Scientific classification
- Kingdom: Animalia
- Phylum: Mollusca
- Class: Gastropoda
- Order: Stylommatophora
- Family: Trochomorphidae
- Genus: Entomostoma; H. B. Baker, 1941

Synonyms
- Brazieria (Entomostoma) H. B. Baker, 1941 (original rank)

Genus of gastropods

Entomostoma is a genus of air-breathing land snails, terrestrial pulmonate gastropod mollusks in the family Trochomorphidae.

== Species ==
Species within the genus Entomostoma include:

- Entomostoma entomostoma (Hombron & Jacquinot, 1841)
