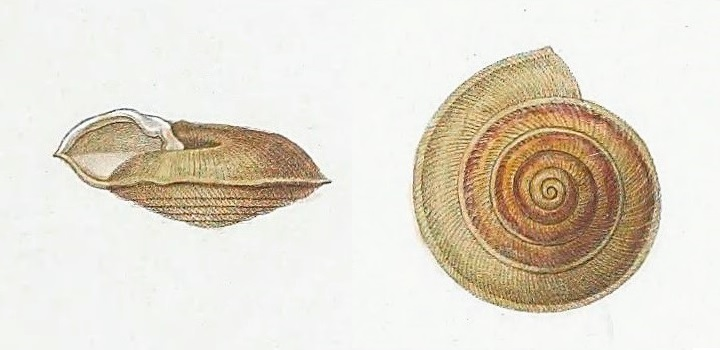

Scientific classification
- Kingdom: Animalia
- Phylum: Mollusca
- Class: Gastropoda
- Order: Stylommatophora
- Family: Trochomorphidae
- Genus: Entomostoma
- Species: E. entomostoma

Binomial name
- Entomostoma entomostoma (Hombron & Jacquinot, 1841)

Synonyms
- Brazieria (Entomostoma) entomostoma (Hombron & Jacquinot, 1841); Brazieria entomostoma (Hombron & Jacquinot, 1841); Helix entomostoma Hombron & Jacquinot, 1841 (original combination)

= Entomostoma entomostoma =

Species of gastropod

Entomostoma entomostoma is a species of air-breathing land snails, terrestrial pulmonate gastropod mollusks in the family Trochomorphidae.

== Distribution ==
This species occurs on the Caroline Islands.
