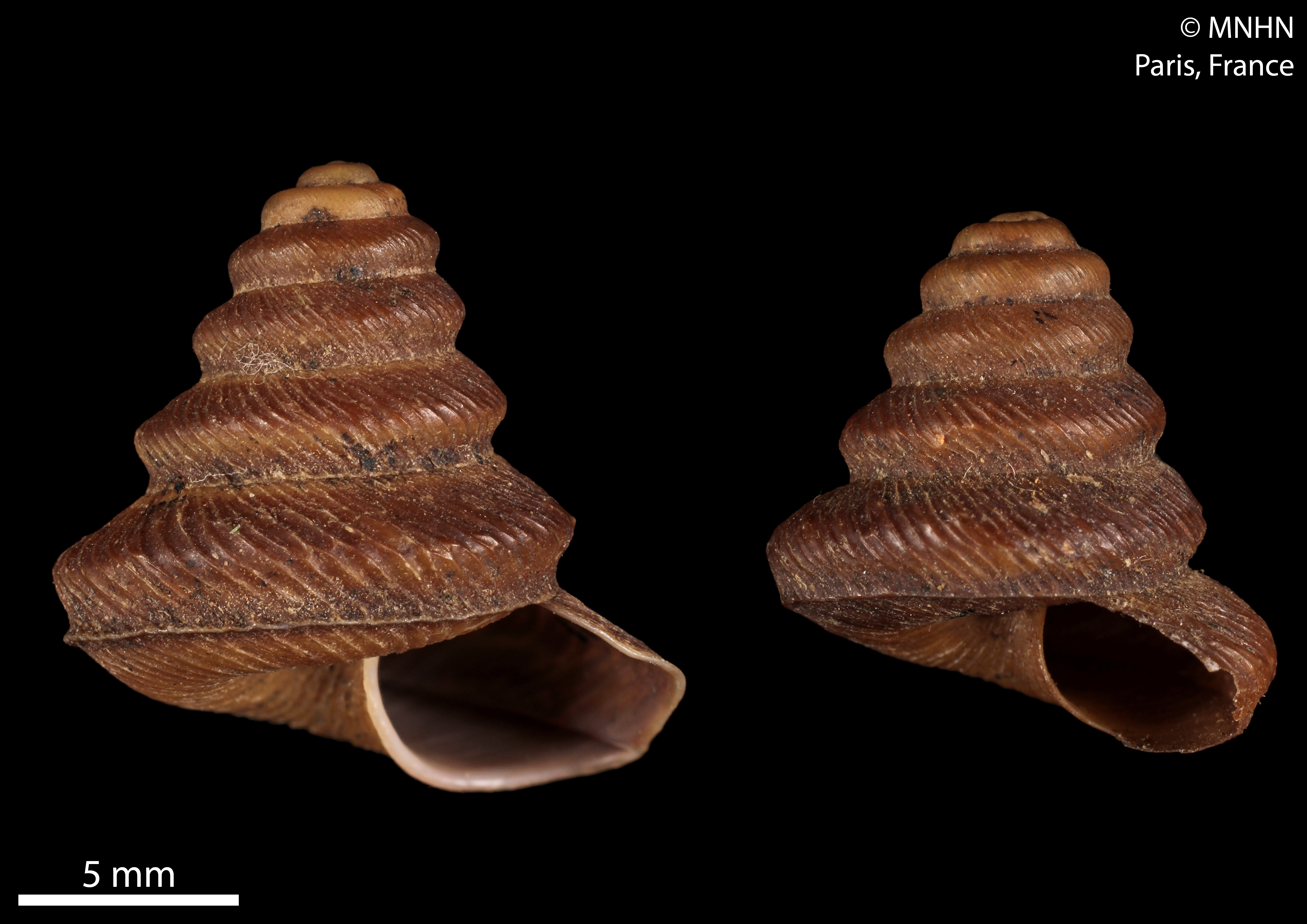
- Shell of Foxidonta stevensoni (specimen at MNHN, Paris)

Scientific classification
- Kingdom: Animalia
- Phylum: Mollusca
- Class: Gastropoda
- Order: Stylommatophora
- Family: Trochomorphidae
- Genus: Foxidonta; Clench, 1950

Type species
- Foxidonta stevensoni Clench, 1950

= Foxidonta =

Genus of gastropods

Foxidonta is a genus of air-breathing land snails, terrestrial pulmonate gastropod mollusks in the family Trochomorphidae.

== Distribution ==
This species was found on the Solomon islands.

== Species ==
Species within the genus Foxidonta include:

- Foxidonta stevensoni Clench, 1950
