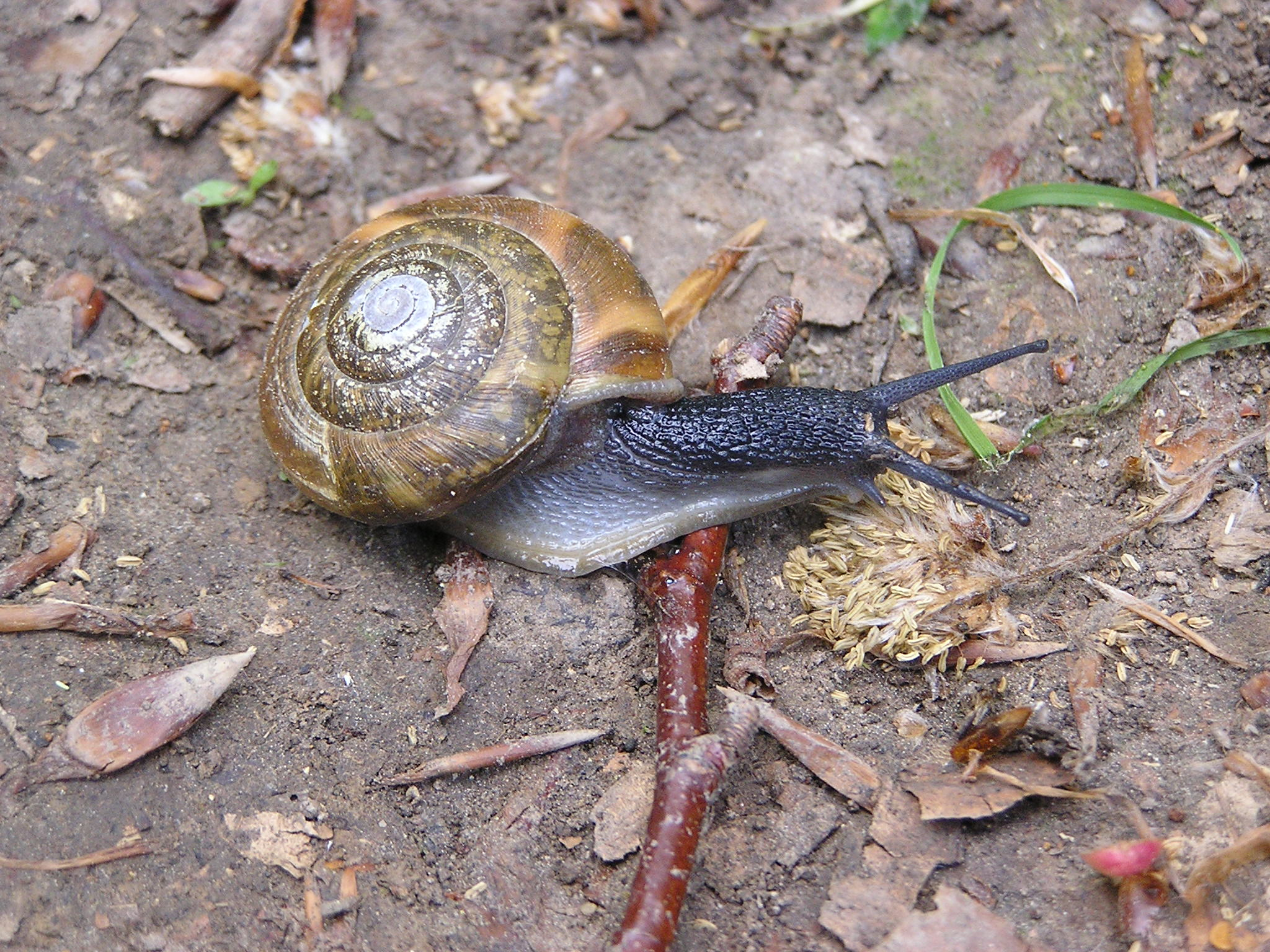

Scientific classification
- Kingdom: Animalia
- Phylum: Mollusca
- Class: Gastropoda
- Order: Stylommatophora
- Family: Zonitidae
- Genus: Aegopis
- Species: A. verticillus

Binomial name
- Aegopis verticillus (Lamarck, 1822)

= Aegopis verticillus =

Species of gastropod

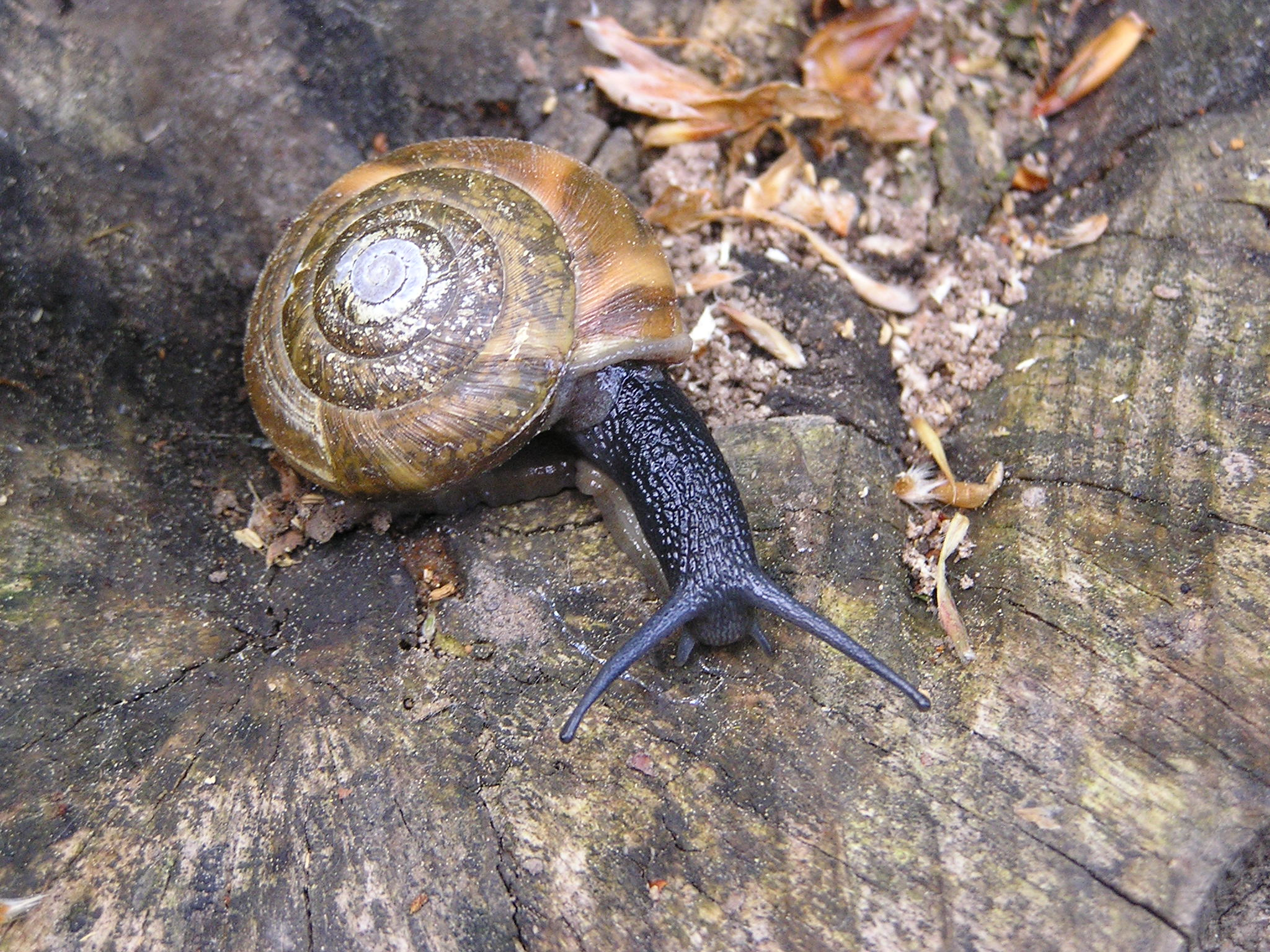
Aegopis verticillus

Aegopis verticillus is a species of air-breathing land snail, a terrestrial pulmonate gastropod mollusk in the family Zonitidae, the true glass snails. It was first described in 1822 by Lamarck. It is defined as Least Concern on the ICUN Red List.

== Distribution ==
This species occurs in Europe, including Bosnia, Montenegro, Serbia, Hungary, Czech Republic, Italy and the Alps, and has been introduced to Germany.
