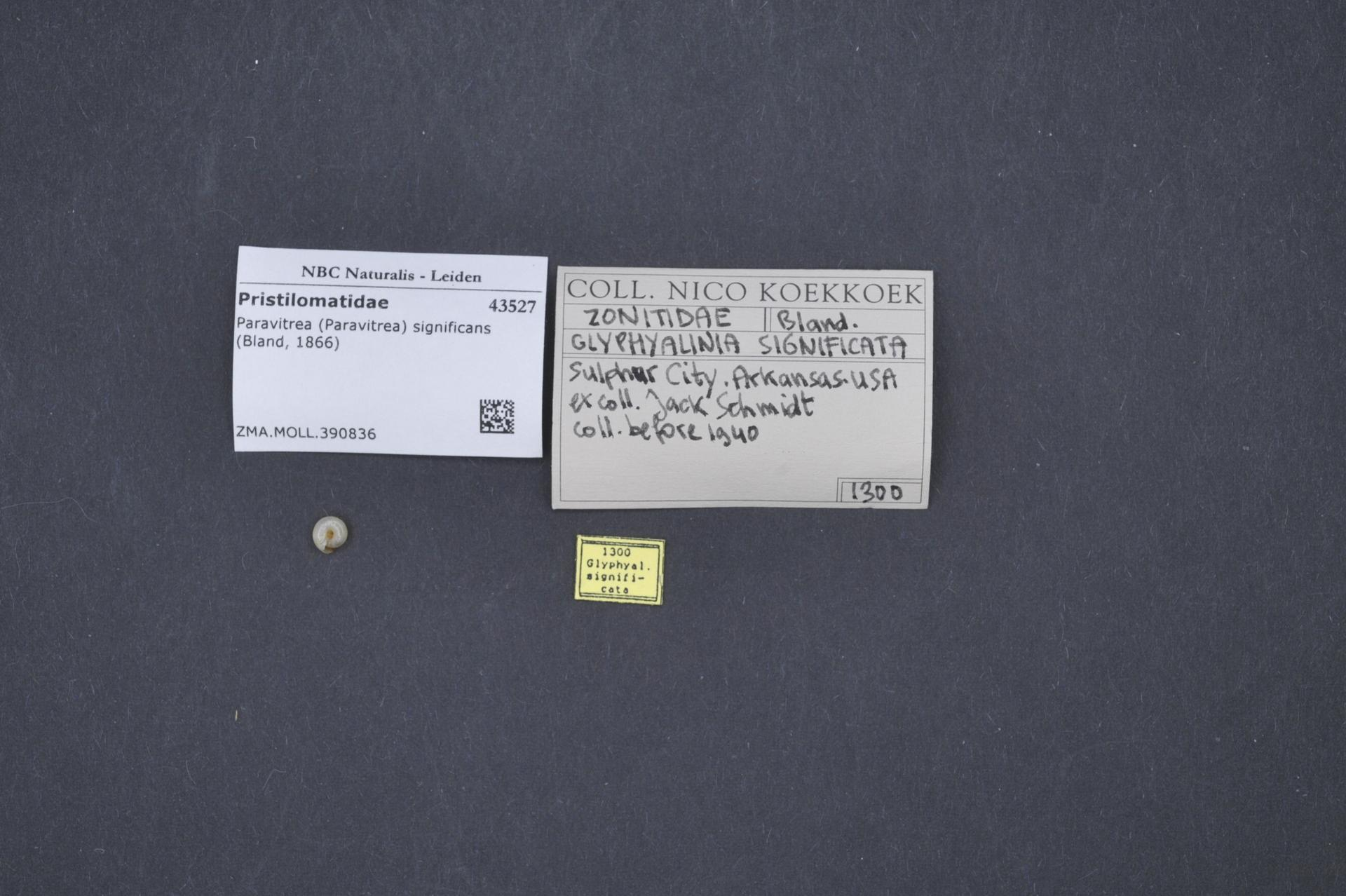
- P. significans shell in the collection of the Zoölogisch Museum Amsterdam

Scientific classification
- Kingdom: Animalia
- Phylum: Mollusca
- Class: Gastropoda
- Order: Stylommatophora
- Family: Pristilomatidae
- Genus: Paravitrea; Pilsbry, 1898

Type species
- Helix capsella Gould, 1851

Synonyms
- Gastrodonta (Taxeodonta) Pilsbry, 1898; Paravitrea (Paravitrea) Pilsbry, 1898; Paravitrea (Paravitreops) Baker, 1928; Paravitrea (Parmavitrea) Baker, 1931; Paravitrea (Pectovitrea) Baker, 1931; Paravitrea (Petrovitrea) Baker, 1931; Taxeodonta Pilsbry, 1898; Vitrea (Paravitrea) Pilsbry, 1898

= Paravitrea =

Genus of gastropods

Paravitrea is a genus of land snail in the family Pristilomatidae.

== Species ==
Species within the genus Paravitrea include:

- Paravitrea alethia Hubricht, 1978
- Paravitrea amicalola Hubricht, 1976
- Paravitrea andrewsae (Binney, 1879)
- Paravitrea aulacogyra (Pilsbry & Ferriss, 1906)
- Paravitrea bellona Hubricht, 1978
- Paravitrea bidens Hubricht, 1963
- Paravitrea blarina Hubricht, 1963
- Paravitrea calcicola Baker, 1931
- Paravitrea capsella (Gould, 1851)
- Paravitrea ceres Hubricht, 1978
- Paravitrea clappi (Pilsbry, 1898)
- Paravitrea conecuhensis (Clapp, 1917)
- Paravitrea dentilla Hubricht, 1978
- Paravitrea diana Hubricht, 1983
- Paravitrea grimmi Hubricht, 1968
- Paravitrea hera Hubricht, 1983
- Paravitrea lacteodens (Pilsbry, 1903)
- Paravitrea lamellidens (Pilsbry, 1898)
- Paravitrea lapilla Hubricht, 1965
- Paravitrea metallacta Hubricht, 1963
- Paravitrea mira Hubricht, 1975
- Paravitrea multidentata (Binney, 1840)
- Paravitrea nunnehi Slapcinsky, Furr, Van Devender & Van Devender, 2023
- Paravitrea petrophila (Bland, 1883)
- Paravitrea pilsbryana (Clapp, 1919)
- Paravitrea placentula (Shuttleworth, 1852)
- Paravitrea pontis Baker, 1931
- Paravitrea reesei Morrison, 1937
- Paravitrea septadens Hubricht, 1978
- Paravitrea seradens Hubricht, 1972
- Paravitrea significans (Bland, 1866)
- Paravitrea simpsoni (Pilsbry, 1889)
- Paravitrea subtilis Hubricht, 1978
- Paravitrea tantilla Hubricht, 1963
- Paravitrea ternaria Hubricht, 1978
- Paravitrea tiara Hubricht, 1978
- Paravitrea toma Hubricht, 1975
- Paravitrea tridens Pilsbry, 1946
- Paravitrea umbilicaris (Ancey, 1887)
- Paravitrea variabilis Baker, 1929
- Paravitrea varidens Hubricht, 1978

Species formerly placed in this genus include:

- Paravitrea roundyi Morrison, 1935 – now accepted as Helicodiscus roundyi (Morrison, 1935)
