= Glyphyalinia =

Scientific classification
- Kingdom: Animalia
- Phylum: Mollusca
- Class: Gastropoda
- Order: Stylommatophora
- Family: Gastrodontidae
- Genus: Glyphyalinia von Martens, 1892

Type species
- Helix indentata Say, 1822

Species
- 25 species, see text

Synonyms
- Glyphognomon Baker, 1930; Glyphyalinia (Glyphyalinia von Martens, 1892; Glyphyalinia (Glyphyalops) Baker, 1928; Hyalinia (Glyphyalinia) von Martens, 1892; Retinella (Glyphognomon) Baker, 1930; Retinella (Glyphyalinia) von Martens, 1892; Retinella (Glyphyalops) Baker, 1928

Genus of gastropods

Glyphyalinia is a genus of land snails in the family Gastrodontidae.

== Species ==
The genus Glyphyalinia includes the following species:

- Glyphyalinia barbadensis Chase & Robinson, 2001
- Glyphyalinia carolinensis (Cockerell, 1890)
- Glyphyalinia cryptomphala (Clapp, 1915)
- Glyphyalinia cumberlandiana (Clapp, 1919)
- Glyphyalinia floridana (Morrison, 1937)
- Glyphyalinia indentata (Say, 1822)
- Glyphyalinia insecta (von Martens, 1877)
- Glyphyalinia junaluskana (Clench & Banks, 1932)
- Glyphyalinia latebricola Hubricht, 1968
- Glyphyalinia lewisiana (Clapp, 1908)
- Glyphyalinia luticola Hubricht, 1966
- Glyphyalinia ocoae Hubricht, 1978
- Glyphyalinia pecki Hubricht, 1966
- Glyphyalinia pentadelphia (Pilsbry, 1900)
- Glyphyalinia picea Hubricht, 1976
- Glyphyalinia praecox (Baker, 1930)
- Glyphyalinia raderi (Dall, 1898)
- Glyphyalinia rhoadsi (Pilsbry, 1899)
- Glyphyalinia rimula Hubricht, 1968
- Glyphyalinia roemeri (Pilsbry & Ferriss, 1906)
- Glyphyalinia sculptilis (Bland, 1858)
- Glyphyalinia solida (Baker, 1930)
- Glyphyalinia specus Hubricht, 1965
- Glyphyalinia virginica (Morrison, 1937)
- Glyphyalinia wheatleyi (Bland, 1883)
