= Kondoa (gastropod) =

Scientific classification
- Kingdom: Animalia
- Phylum: Mollusca
- Class: Gastropoda
- Order: Stylommatophora
- Infraorder: Limacoidei
- Superfamily: Trochomorphoidea
- Family: Trochomorphidae
- Genus: Kondoa; H. B. Baker, 1941

Genus of molluscs

Kondoa is a genus of mostly small, air-breathing land snails, terrestrial pulmonate gastropod mollusks in the family Trochomorphidae.

== Species ==
Species within the genus Kondoa include:

- Kondoa asteriscus H. B. Baker, 1941
- Kondoa kondorum

== See also ==
- Kondoa District — unrelated political division of Tanzania.
