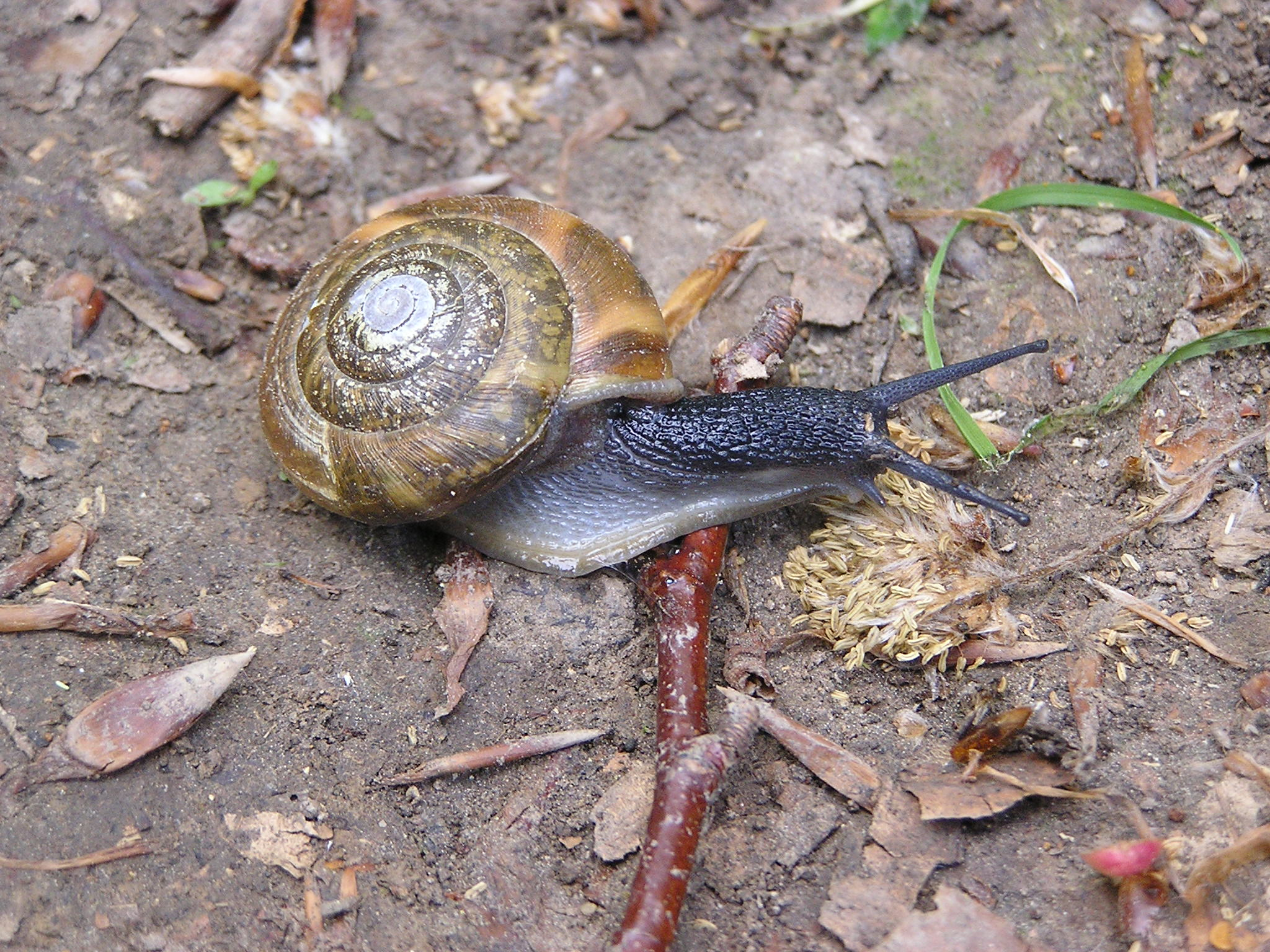
- A live individual of Aegopis verticillus

Scientific classification
- Kingdom: Animalia
- Phylum: Mollusca
- Class: Gastropoda
- Order: Stylommatophora
- Suborder: Helicina
- Infraorder: Limacoidei
- Superfamily: Zonitoidea; Mörch, 1864
- Family: Zonitidae; Mörch, 1864

Genera
- See text

= Zonitidae =

Zonitidae Temporal range: Paleocene or Cretaceous – Recent

Family of gastropods

Zonitidae, common name the true glass snails, are a family of mostly rather small, air-breathing land snails, terrestrial pulmonate gastropod mollusks in the superfamily Zonitoidea.

Zonitidae is the only family in the superfamily Zonitoidea. The family's type genus is Zonites, established by Pierre Denys de Montfort in 1810. This family has no subfamilies (according to the taxonomy of the Gastropoda by Bouchet & Rocroi, 2005).

== Distribution ==
The distribution of the Zonitidae encompasses the western Palearctic.

== Shell description ==
The spiral, heliciform shells of these snails are flattened in shape with a very low spire. The shell is perforate or umbilicate. The lip of the aperture is simple, lacking thickened margin. These shells are more or less transparent as if made of glass, hence the popular name "glass snails". The shells are colorless or of an amber to brownish color.

== Biology ==
Some snails in genera within this family create and use love darts as part of their mating behavior.

In this family, the number of haploid chromosomes lies between 21 and 25 and also lies between 31 and 35, but other values are also possible (according to the values in this table).

== Ecology ==
These snails live in damp places under stones and similar objects. The true glass snails are usually nocturnal.

== Genera ==
Genera within the family Zonitidae include:

- Aegopis Fitzinger, 1833
- Aegopinella Lindholm, 1927
- Allaegopis Riedel, 1979
- Balcanodiscus Riedel & Urbanski, 1964
- Brazieria Ancey, 1887
- Doraegopis Riedel, 1982
- Eopolita Pollonera, 1916
- Glyphyalinia Martens, 1892
- Gollumia Riedel, 1988
- † Macrozonites Wenz, 1919
- Meledella Sturany, 1908
- Mesomphix Rafinesque, 1819
- Ogaridiscus Dall, 1877
- Paraegopis Hesse, 1910
- Paravitrea Pilsbry, 1898
- Retinella Fischer, 1877
- Thasiogenes Riedel, 1998
- Troglaegopis Riedel & Radja, 1983
- Turcozonites Riedel, 1987
- Ventridens Binney & Bland, 1869
- Zonites Montfort, 1810 – type genus

== Cladogram ==
The following cladogram shows the phylogenic relationships of this family to other families in the limacoid clade:

- limacoid clade
  - Staffordioidea
    Staffordiidae
  - - - Dyakioidea
        Dyakiidae
      - Gastrodontoidea
        - Pristilomatidae
        - - Chronidae
          - - Euconulidae
            - Trochomorphidae
          - - Gastrodontidae
            - Oxychilidae
    - - Parmacelloidea
        - Trigonochlamydidae
        - Parmacellidae
        - Milacidae
      - - - Zonitoidea
            Zonitidae
          - Helicarionoidea
            - Helicarionidae
            - - Ariophantidae
              - Urocyclidae
        - Limacoidea
          - Vitrinidae
          - - Boettgerillidae
            - - Limacidae
              - Agriolimacidae
