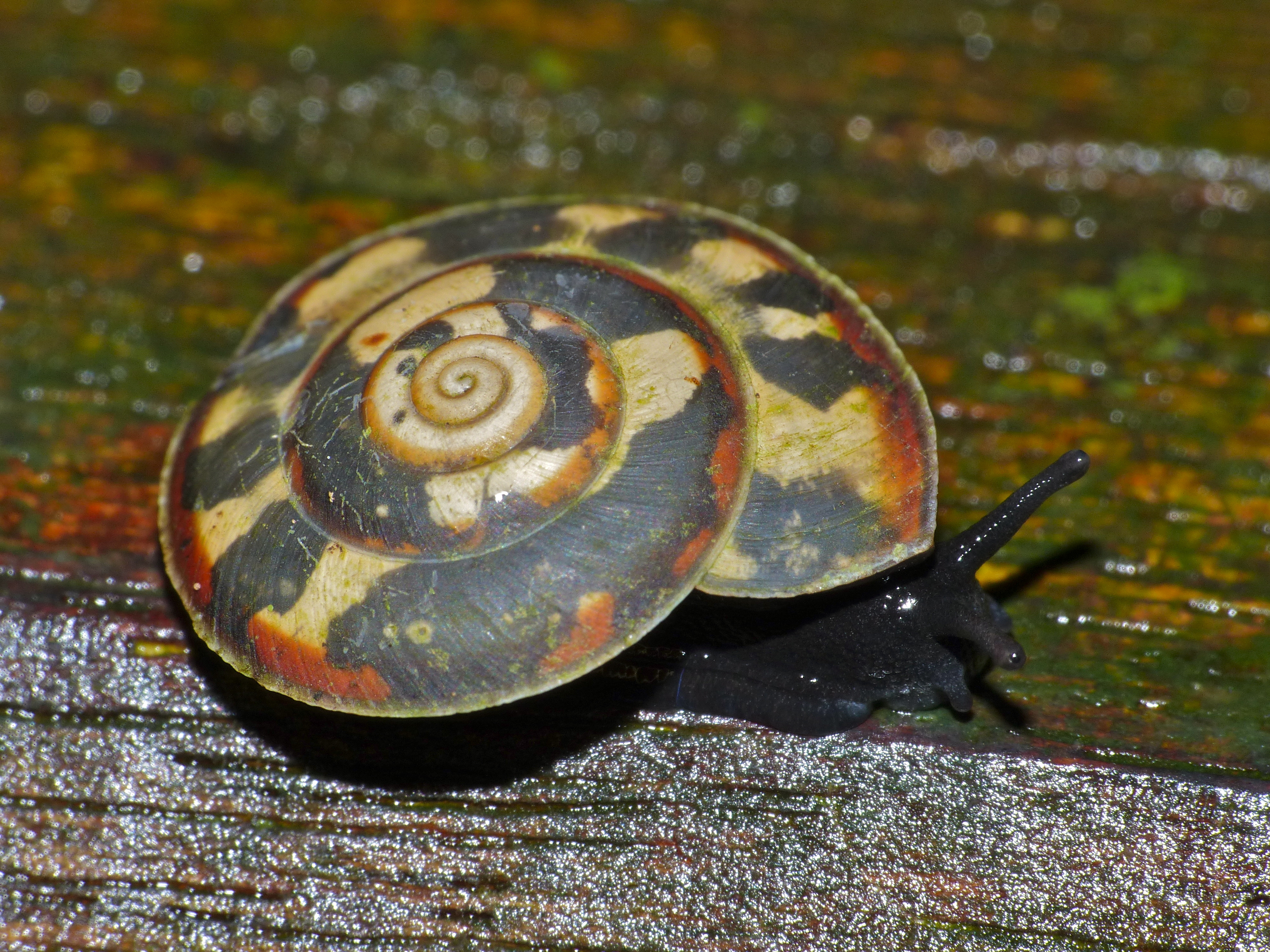

Scientific classification
- Kingdom: Animalia
- Phylum: Mollusca
- Class: Gastropoda
- Order: Stylommatophora
- Suborder: Helicina
- Infraorder: Limacoidei
- Superfamily: Trochomorphoidea
- Family: Trochomorphidae; Möllendorff, 1890

Genera
- See text

Synonyms
- Geotrochidae Schileyko, 2002

= Trochomorphidae =

Family of gastropods

Trochomorphidae is a family of air-breathing land snails, terrestrial pulmonate gastropod mollusks in the superfamily Gastrodontoidea (according to the taxonomy of the Gastropoda by Bouchet & Rocroi, 2005). Since 2017, its classification has been revised and it now belongs to the superfamily Trochomorphoidea

This family has no subfamilies (according to the taxonomy of the Gastropoda by Bouchet & Rocroi, 2005).

== Distribution ==
The distribution of Trochomorphidae includes eastern-Palearctic, India, south-eastern Asia, Australia and Polynesia.

== Anatomy ==
In this family, the number of haploid chromosomes lies between 26 and 30 (according to the values in this table).

== Genera ==
Genera within the family Trochomorphidae include:

- Benthemia Forcart, 1964
- Brazieria Ancey, 1887
- Calostropha Ancey, 1887
- Coxia Ancey, 1887
- Dendrotrochus Pilsbry, 1894
- Entomostoma H. B. Baker, 1941
- Eurybasis Gude, 1913
- Foxidonta Clench, 1950
- Geodiscus Iredale, 1941
- Geotrochus van Hasselt, 1823
- Hogolua Baker, 1941
- Kondoa Baker, 1941
- Liravidena Solem, 1959
- Orpiella L. Pfeiffer & J. E. Gray, 1855
- Peleliua H. B. Baker, 1941
- Probrazieria H. B. Baker, 1941
- Tegumen Gude, 1913
- Theskelomensor Iredale, 1933
- Trochomorpha Albers, 1850 - type genus of the family Trochomorphidae
- Trochositala Schileyko, 2002
- Videna A. Adams 1858
- Videnoida Minato, 1988
- Vitrinoconus C. Semper, 1873

== Cladogram ==
The following cladogram shows the phylogenic relationships of this family to other families within the limacoid clade:

- limacoid clade
  - Staffordioidea
    Staffordiidae
  - - - Dyakioidea
        Dyakiidae
      - Gastrodontoidea
        - Pristilomatidae
        - - Chronidae
          - - Euconulidae
            - Trochomorphidae
          - - Gastrodontidae
            - Oxychilidae
    - - Parmacelloidea
        - Trigonochlamydidae
        - Parmacellidae
        - Milacidae
      - - - Zonitoidea
            Zonitidae
          - Helicarionoidea
            - Helicarionidae
            - - Ariophantidae
              - Urocyclidae
        - Limacoidea
          - Vitrinidae
          - - Boettgerillidae
            - - Limacidae
              - Agriolimacidae
