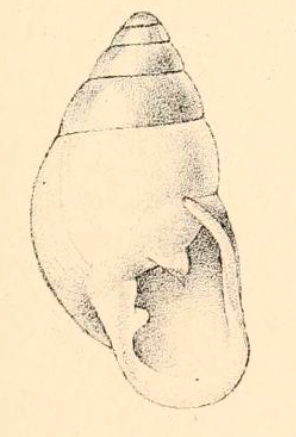
- Drawings of specimens of Auriculella montana

Scientific classification
- Kingdom: Animalia
- Phylum: Mollusca
- Class: Gastropoda
- Order: Stylommatophora
- Family: Achatinellidae
- Genus: Auriculella
- Species: A. montana

Binomial name
- Auriculella montana C. M. Cooke, 1915

= Auriculella montana =

Species of gastropod

Auriculella montana is a species of tropical air-breathing land snails, terrestrial pulmonate gastropod mollusks.

== Description ==
The length of the shell attains 10.1 mm, its diameter 5.3 mm.

(Original description) The shell is perforated and dextral (rarely sinistral), ovate in shape. The spire is cream-buff or ivory-yellow, while the body whorl is opaque white. The shell is solid and glossy, and under magnification it appears very finely striate with growth lines. The spire is conical, with outlines that are barely convex, and the apex is small. The suture is simple and slightly impressed.

The shell consists of six and a half whorls, which are slightly convex; the body whorl is long and ovate, with a tapering base and a somewhat flattened dorsal surface. The aperture is white, auriform, not oblique, and only very slightly diagonal. The parietal lamella is rather thin, small, and vertical. The columella is thickened and bears a rather small, almost horizontal thin lamella.

The lip is thickened, with the outer margin sinuously thickened, the lower margin spreading, and the columellar margin reflexed over the umbilicus. The columella and outer lip are united by a rather thick, smooth callus, bearing a transverse tubercle at their junction. The umbilicus is ovate.

== Distribution ==
This species is endemic to Oahu Island, (Hawaii).
