= Auriculella cerea =

Scientific classification
- Kingdom: Animalia
- Phylum: Mollusca
- Class: Gastropoda
- Order: Stylommatophora
- Family: Achatinellidae
- Genus: Auriculella
- Species: A. cerea

Binomial name
- Auriculella cerea (L. Pfeiffer, 1855)

Synonyms
- Achatinella cerea L. Pfeiffer, 1855 superseded combination

Species of land snail

Auriculella cerea is a species of tropical air-breathing land snails, terrestrial pulmonate gastropod mollusks, belonging to the family Achatinellidae.

== Description ==
The length of the shell attains 8.7 mm, its diameter 3.7 mm.

(Original description in Latin) The shell is subperforate, dextral, and possesses an elongated-conic shape. It is thin in texture, finely striated, diaphanous (translucent), and waxy in appearance. The spire is turreted and terminates in an obtuse apex.

There are eight whorls that are scarcely convex. The body whorl is nearly equal to one-third of the total length of the shell and is slightly compressed at its base. The aperture is only slightly oblique and takes a truncated-oval form.

The parietal lamella is thin, while the columellar fold is obsolete. The peristome is white; its right margin is briefly expanded, and the columellar margin is dilated and spreading.

== Distribution ==
This species occurs on Hawaii.
