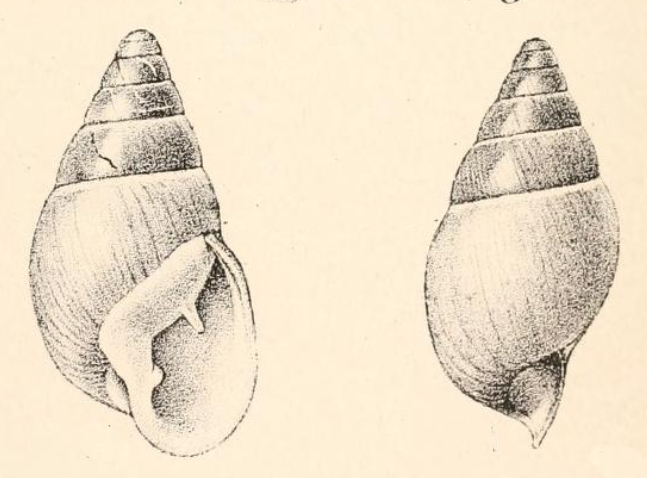
- Drawing of a specimen of Auriculella olivacea

Scientific classification
- Kingdom: Animalia
- Phylum: Mollusca
- Class: Gastropoda
- Order: Stylommatophora
- Family: Achatinellidae
- Genus: Auriculella
- Species: A. olivacea

Binomial name
- Auriculella olivacea C. M. Cooke, 1915

= Auriculella olivacea =

Species of gastropod

Auriculella olivacea is a species of tropical air-breathing land snails, terrestrial pulmonate gastropod mollusks.

== Description ==
The length of the shell attains 10.5 mm, its diameter 5.4 mm.

(Original description) The shell is perforate-umbilicate, dextral, and ovately conical, and is rather solid in structure. The body whorl is amber yellow, while the remaining whorls are brown, shading into the lighter color on the penultimate whorl; the interior of the umbilical region is white, and a narrow white band accompanies the suture. The surface is glossy and distinctly striate. The spire is conical, with a slightly obtuse apex. The suture is slightly margined and scarcely impressed.

The shell consists of six and a half whorls that are nearly flat; the body whorl is rotund, slightly elongate, and convexly tapering at the base. The aperture is hardly oblique, nearly ovate, and slightly diagonal. The parietal lamella is rather small and nearly vertical. The columella is simple and thickened, bearing a rather small lamella.

The lip is expanded and thickened, with the outer margin arcuate and bordered externally with white. The columellar margin is reflexed over the umbilicus and connected to the outer margin by a rather thick greenish-white callus. The umbilicus is large for the genus and nearly circular.

== Distribution ==
This species is endemic to Oahu Island, (Hawaii).
