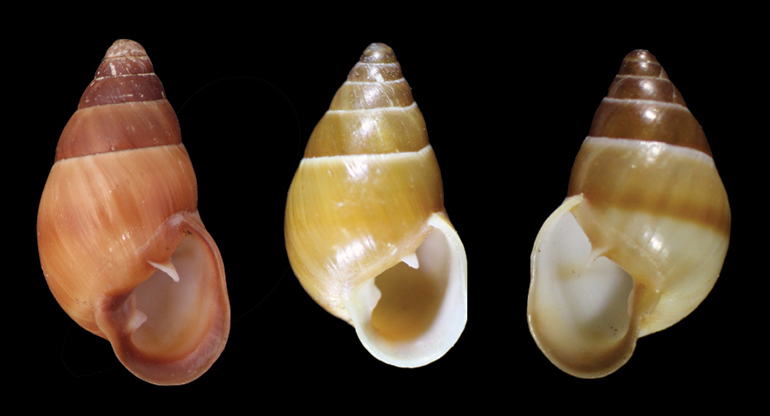
- = Shell of Auriculella auricula

Scientific classification
- Kingdom: Animalia
- Phylum: Mollusca
- Class: Gastropoda
- Order: Stylommatophora
- Family: Achatinellidae
- Genus: Auriculella
- Species: A. auricula

Binomial name
- Auriculella auricula (A. Férussac, 1821)

Synonyms
- Achatinella auricula (A. Férussac, 1821) (unaccepted combination); Auricula owaihiensis Chamisso, 1829 junior subjective synonym; Auricula sinistrorsa Chamisso, 1829 junior subjective synonym; Auriculella auricula f. pellucida Pilsbry & C. M. Cooke, 1915 junior subjective synonym; Auriculella patula E. A. Smith, 1873 junior subjective synonym; Auriculella perkinsi Sykes, 1900 junior subjective synonym; Auriculella triplicata Pease, 1868 junior subjective synonym; Partula auricula A. Férussac, 1821 superseded combination; Partula dumartroyii Souleyet, 1842 junior subjective synonym

= Auriculella auricula =

Species of land snail

Auriculella auricula is a species of tropical air-breathing land snails, terrestrial pulmonate gastropod mollusks, belonging to the family Achatinellidae.

== Description ==
The length of the shell attains 8 mm, its diameter 4 mm.

(Original description in Latin) The shell is ovate-acute in shape, imperforate, and relatively thick. It is finely striated and displays a yellowish coloration. The spire is conical and terminates in an obtuse apex.

There are five contiguous whorls, the last of which is ventricose (inflated) and exhibits a slightly carinate (keeled) form. The aperture is subquadrangular in shape. The peristome is acute and thickened internally, with the outer side appearing flexed or bent.

The columella is unidentate, featuring a single tooth. At the base of the aperture, the shell is further fortified by a highly prominent, elevated lamella.

(Newer description in 2020) The shell can be either dextral or sinistral in its coiling and is characterized by flat-sided whorls and an obtuse apex. On average, the shell reaches a height of 8.0 p.m. 0.4 mm and a width of 4.3 p.m. 0.2 mm. It typically consists of approximately six whorls (6.0 p.m. 0.2), with the aperture measuring 4.1 p.m. 0.2 mm in height and 3.1 p.m. 0.2 mm in width. The internal anatomy features a columella equipped with a single strong lamella, notably lacking an axial ridge. The parietal lamella is likewise strong, possessing a smooth, non-undulating surface that extends between 0.3 and 0.7 whorls into the interior of the aperture.In terms of coloration, the shell varies from tan and brown to yellowish. It is frequently adorned with a single, narrow band of either brown or white. In some specimens, these white bands are bordered by two darker brown bands, and the apical whorls often exhibit a deeper brown hue. The lip is reflected and thickened, presenting in either a white or brown color.

The reproductive system: the phallus retractor muscle is relatively long and is attached apically to a short but well-defined epiphallus. The appendix is longer than the phallus itself, possessing a diameter approximately two-thirds that of the phallus at its point of attachment. This appendix narrows abruptly at one-fifth of its total length and remains narrow until it reaches its terminus.

The phallus is notably broad, exhibiting only a slight narrowing at the apical and basal ends. The atrium is characterized by a relatively short and broad structure, while the vagina measures approximately one-third the total length of the phallus.

The radula features an irregular rachidian tooth, which is flanked on either side by rastriform marginal teeth—a characteristic diagnostic of the family. Each tooth is anchored by a long, narrow base that expands gradually over three-quarters of its total length. Upon reaching the final quarter of the tooth, the structure transitions into forward-curving cusps.

There are three primary long cusps located at the mesocone, endocone, and ectocone positions. Intercalated between these primary points are two or more alternating larger and smaller cusps. Across the width of the radula, the number of teeth per row ranges from 177 to 183. *

== Distribution ==
This species occurs on Hawaii.
