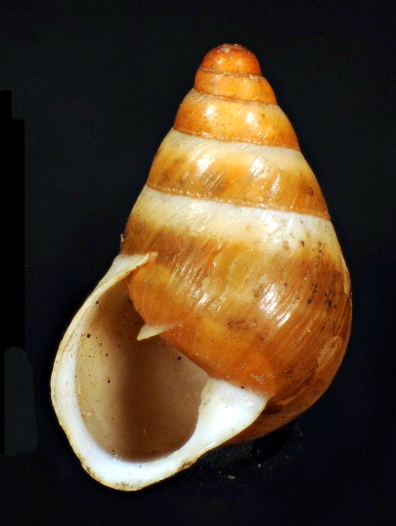
- left-handed shell of Auriculella expansa (specimen at the Malacology Collection at the Academy of Natural Sciences of Philadelphia)

Conservation status
- Extinct (IUCN 2.3)

- Possibly Extinct (NatureServe)

Scientific classification
- Kingdom: Animalia
- Phylum: Mollusca
- Class: Gastropoda
- Order: Stylommatophora
- Family: Achatinellidae
- Genus: Auriculella
- Species: †A. expansa

Binomial name
- †Auriculella expansa Pease, 1868

Synonyms
- Auriculella expansa var. porcellana Ancey, 1889 junior subjective synonym

= Auriculella expansa =

Species of gastropod

Auriculella expansa was a species of tropical air-breathing land snails, terrestrial pulmonate gastropod mollusks.

== Description ==
(Original description in French) The shell is solid and takes an oval, slightly pyramidal form. While it is habitually sinistral, it is rarely found to be dextral. It is visibly umbilicated and is adorned with fine longitudinal striae. The summit is obtuse, and the suture is well-marked, leading to a base that is compressed and nearly flat.

There are six whorls that are plano-convex in shape. The body whorl is large, slightly inflated, and strongly projected forward. The outer margin is well-developed and slightly reflected. The parietal lamella is white and strongly pronounced, whereas the columella is only weakly dilated at its upper portion and entirely lacks a lamella.

Regarding its coloration, the shell is generally whitish or a light straw-yellow with a brownish summit. However, some specimens appear brownish and feature a single white band that follows the direction of the whorls' coiling.

The most distinctive characteristic of this species lies in the unique shape of the body whorl, which is prominently projected forward.

== Distribution ==
This species was endemic to Hawaii, United States.
