= Pacificella baldwini =

Scientific classification
- Kingdom: Animalia
- Phylum: Mollusca
- Class: Gastropoda
- Order: Stylommatophora
- Family: Achatinellidae
- Genus: Pacificella
- Species: P. baldwini

Binomial name
- Pacificella baldwini (Ancey, 1889)

Synonyms
- List of synonyms: Pacificella baldwini baldwini (Ancey, 1889) superseded rank (no subspecies recognized); Pacificella baldwini subrugosa (Pilsbry & C. M. Cooke, 1915) · > junior subjective synonym; Pacificella mcgregori (Pilsbry & C. M. Cooke, 1915) junior subjective synonym; Tornatellina baldwini Ancey, 1889 superseded combination; Tornatellina baldwini subrugosa Pilsbry & C. M. Cooke, 1915 junior subjective synonym; Tornatellina mcgregori Pilsbry & C. M. Cooke, 1915 junior subjective synonym; Tornatellinops baldwini (Ancey, 1889) superseded combination; Tornatellinops baldwini subrugosa (Pilsbry & C. M. Cooke, 1915); Tornatellinops mcgregori (Pilsbry & C. M. Cooke, 1915)

Species of gastropods

Pacificella baldwini is a species of tropical air-breathing land snail, a terrestrial pulmonate gastropod mollusk in the family Achatinellidae.

== Description ==
The length of the shell attains 2.5 mm, its diameter 1.5 mm.

(Original description in Latin) The shell is oblong-ovate in shape, imperforate, thin, translucent, horn-colored, and glossy, appearing under a lens as only very faintly striated. The spire is conoid and rises slightly above the aperture, with a somewhat sharp apex. There are four convex whorls, rapidly increasing in size, the body whorl being oblong. The aperture is sharply oblong-ovate, not compressed externally, and bears on the parietal wall a rather small, coiling lamella. The columella is thickened, whitish, toothless, and obliquely twisted, continuing anteriorly into the margin.

== Distribution ==
This species occurs on Oahu Island, Hawaii.
