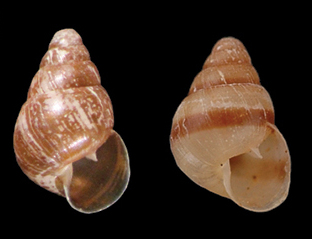
- Specimens of Auriculella minuta

Scientific classification
- Kingdom: Animalia
- Phylum: Mollusca
- Class: Gastropoda
- Order: Stylommatophora
- Family: Achatinellidae
- Genus: Auriculella
- Species: A. minuta

Binomial name
- Auriculella minuta C. M. Cooke & Pilsbry, 1915

= Auriculella minuta =

Species of gastropod

Auriculella minuta is a species of tropical air-breathing land snails, terrestrial pulmonate gastropod mollusks.

== Description ==
The length of the shell attains 4.8 mm, its diameter 3.7 mm.

(Original description) The shell is narrowly perforate, dextral, and ovately conic in shape. Its coloration is primarily cartridge buff on the body whorl, marked by faint cinnamon streaks that shade into a deeper cinnamon toward the spire. The structure is thin, slightly translucent, and glossy; when viewed under a lens, the surface reveals minute striations that follow the lines of growth.

The spire is conic with an obtuse apex, and the suture is slightly impressed and marginate.

There are 5 3/4 slightly convex whorls. The body whorl is rotund and becomes subsaccate at the base. The aperture is irregularly ovate in form. Within the aperture, the parietal lamella is small, thin, and whitish, standing at an angle of approximately 45° relative to the axis.

The columella is edentulous (toothless) and slightly twisted. The lip is thin and slightly expanded, featuring a convex outer margin and a columellar margin that is reflexed and nearly adnate. The umbilicus is narrow and appears subrimate.

(Newer description in 2020) The shell is dextral with inflated whorls, exhibiting an average height of 4.4 ± 0.18 mm and a width of 2.7 ± 0.11 mm. Based on a sample size of 50 specimens, the whorl count averages 5.1 ± 0.08. The aperture measures approximately 1.9 ± 0.11 mm in height and 1.3 ± 0.08 mm in width. In juvenile specimens, the columella features a strong lamella; however, in adults, this structure is reduced and obscured by a thickening of the inner edge of the lip. Some adults retain a short projection or angulation at the former site of the columellar lamella. The adult columella is reflected and lacks an axial ridge. The parietal lamella is smooth and notably not undulate, extending between 0.2 and 0.5 whorls into the aperture. The shell color ranges from pale tan to dark brown and may appear with or without a single peripheral color band of a contrasting shade.

Reproductive system: The reproductive system contains a relatively long phallus retractor muscle, which is attached apically to a short but well-defined epiphallus. The appendix is nearly equal in length to the phallus and matches its diameter at the point of attachment. This appendix narrows abruptly at one-third of its length and remains narrow until it reaches its terminus. Regarding the phallus, the apical three-quarters are broad, while the basal quarter narrows abruptly and remains slender until it joins the moderately long atrium. Unlike in similar species, the vagina is long, measuring nearly half the length of the phallus.

Radula and dentition: The radula is characterized by an irregular rachidian flanked on either side by rastriform marginal teeth, a diagnostic feature for this family. Each tooth possesses a long, narrow base that expands slowly over three-quarters of its length. The final quarter of the tooth is composed of forward-curving cusps. There are three primary long cusps at the mesocone, endocone, and ectocone positions, with two or more larger and smaller cusps intercalated between them in an alternating pattern. On average, there are approximately 105 teeth per row.

== Distribution ==
This species is endemic to Oahu Island, (Hawaii).
