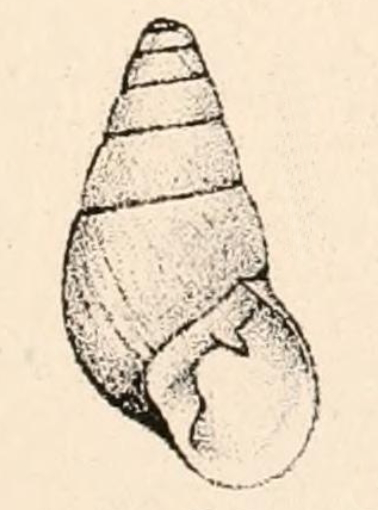
- Drawing of a shell of Auriculella straminea (holotype)

Scientific classification
- Kingdom: Animalia
- Phylum: Mollusca
- Class: Gastropoda
- Order: Stylommatophora
- Family: Achatinellidae
- Genus: Auriculella
- Species: A. straminea

Binomial name
- Auriculella straminea C. M. Cooke, 1915

= Auriculella straminea =

Species of gastropod

Auriculella straminea is a species of tropical air-breathing land snails, terrestrial pulmonate gastropod mollusks.

== Description ==
The length of the shell attains 7.6 mm, its diameter 3.7 mm.

(Original description) The shell is both perforate and rimate, featuring a dextral, elongately conic shape. Its coloration is a pale chalcedony yellow that fades toward the apex and becomes more opaque—nearly a straw yellow—near the lip. The structure is thin, imperfectly diaphanous, and glossy; when viewed under a lens, the surface appears very minutely striate with fine lines of growth. The spire is long and conic, terminating in an obtuse apex. The suture is scarcely impressed and only faintly margined.

There are 6 1/4 nearly flat whorls. The body whorl is rather narrow and elongate; it ascends slightly toward the aperture and tapers toward a very convex base. The aperture is irregularly ovate and situated at a slightly oblique and diagonal angle.

A rather small, slightly oblique parietal lamella is present within the aperture. The columella is simple and bears a small, nearly horizontal lamella. The lip is expanded and characterized by a slight internal thickening. Its outer margin is convex, while the columellar margin is reflexed. The parietal callus is thin, though it features a short thickening near the posterior angle. Finally, the umbilical groove is notably long.

== Distribution ==
This species is endemic to Oahu Island, (Hawaii).
