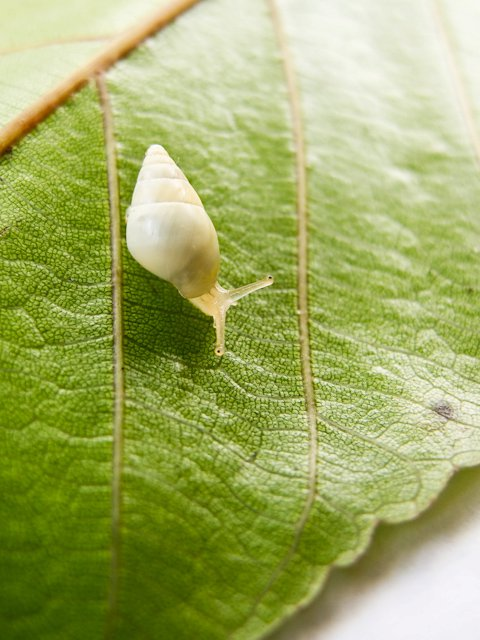

Conservation status
- Data Deficient (IUCN 2.3)

- Critically Imperiled (NatureServe)

Scientific classification
- Kingdom: Animalia
- Phylum: Mollusca
- Class: Gastropoda
- Order: Stylommatophora
- Family: Achatinellidae
- Genus: Auriculella
- Species: A. ambusta

Binomial name
- Auriculella ambusta Pease, 1868

= Auriculella ambusta =

Species of gastropod

Auriculella ambusta is a species of air-breathing tropical land snail, a terrestrial pulmonate gastropod mollusc in the family Achatinellidae.

Subspecies

- Auriculella ambusta ambusta Pease, 1868
- Auriculella ambusta obliqua Ancey, 1892

== Description & Biology ==
The length of the shell attains 8.5 mm, its diameter 5 mm

(Original description in French) The shell is solid, imperforate, and possesses an oval-conic shape with a sinistral coil. It is distinctly striated in a longitudinal direction. There are six whorls in total, which are plano-convex in profile, separated by a well-marked suture that leads to an obtuse summit.

The aperture is vertical and subauriform (somewhat ear-shaped). The peristome is very thick and double-layered, while the parietal lamella is relatively thin. At the extreme upper portion of the columella, there is a thick, strongly twisted fold.

In terms of coloration, the shell is a light purplish-white, except at the base, which is a burnt brown. The shell is covered by a brown epidermis that detaches easily. Both the peristome and the interior of the aperture are a light brown hue.

Auriculella ambustahas a white shell with possible markings. They eat fungi and bacteria from leaves.

== Distribution ==
This species is endemic to the Hawaiian Islands.

== Habitat ==
They are found in the Waianae mountains in west Oahu.
