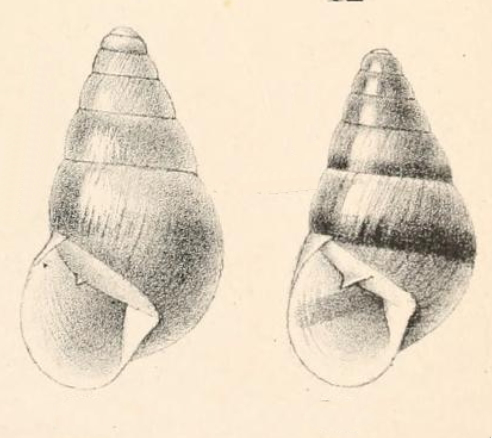
- Drawings of specimens of Auriculella lanaiensis

Scientific classification
- Kingdom: Animalia
- Phylum: Mollusca
- Class: Gastropoda
- Order: Stylommatophora
- Family: Achatinellidae
- Genus: Auriculella
- Species: A. lanaiensis

Binomial name
- Auriculella lanaiensis C. M. Cooke, 1915

= Auriculella lanaiensis =

Species of gastropod

Auriculella lanaiensis is a species of tropical air-breathing land snails, terrestrial pulmonate gastropod mollusks.

== Description ==
The length of the shell attains 5.8 mm, its diameter 3 mm.

(Original description) The shell is characterized by a minute perforation and a sinistral (left-handed) coil, possessing an ovately conic shape. Its coloration is a light cinnamon hue, which transitions to a slightly lighter shade at the base. The structure is somewhat thin and opaque rather than diaphanous, with a surface that is hardly glossy; however, when viewed under a lens, it reveals a rather finely striate texture composed of lines of growth.

The spire is nearly conical in form, terminating in an apex that is rather obtuse. The suture is simple and only lightly impressed. There are 6 whorls that are slightly convex, with the body whorl being rotund and becoming subsaccate (sac-like) at the base.

The aperture is broadly oval, positioned slightly diagonally and with a very slight obliquity. Internally, the parietal lamella is only very slightly developed. The columella is simple in form and is scarcely dentate. The lip stands erect and is very slightly thickened, featuring a gracefully curved outer margin and a columellar margin that is reflexed. Finally, the umbilicus is rather small and subcircular in shape.

== Distribution ==
This species is endemic to Lanai Island, (Hawaii). It is one of Hawaii's state snails.
