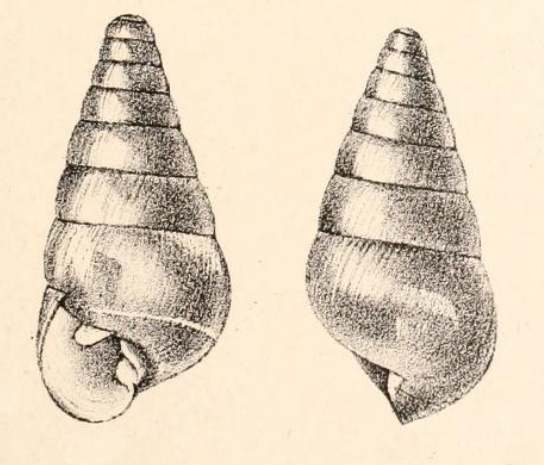
- Drawing of a shell of Auriculella serrula (holotype)

Scientific classification
- Kingdom: Animalia
- Phylum: Mollusca
- Class: Gastropoda
- Order: Stylommatophora
- Family: Achatinellidae
- Genus: Auriculella
- Species: A. serrula

Binomial name
- Auriculella serrula C. M. Cooke, 1915

= Auriculella serrula =

Species of gastropod

Auriculella serrula is a species of tropical air-breathing land snails, terrestrial pulmonate gastropod mollusks.

== Description ==
The length of the shell attains 6.2 mm, its diameter 2.8 mm.

(Original description) The shell is imperforate, sinistral, and turrited with an elongately conic shape. It is a light chestnut-corneous color, characterized by a thin, diaphanous, and glossy texture. When viewed under a lens, the surface is very minutely striate, reflecting the natural lines of growth. The spire is elongately conic and terminates in a somewhat obtuse apex. The suture is not impressed, but it is very narrowly margined and appears slightly darker than the rest of the shell.

There are 8 1/2 whorls; the embryonic whorls are slightly rounded, while the remaining whorls are nearly flat, increasing slowly and remaining rather compact. The body whorl is rotund and becomes subsaccate at the base. The aperture is nearly ovate and sits at a slightly oblique angle.

The parietal lamella is well developed and whitish. It is slightly oblique and minutely serrate, as it is set with microscopic thorn-like spines that incline slightly toward the opening. The columella is twisted, callous, and biplicate. Two parallel, rounded columellar lamellae are roughly equal in size and extend fully to the margin. The lip is thin and remains mostly unexpanded, though it expands slightly at the lower portion. The outer margin is slightly arcuate, while the columellar margin is reflexed and adnate.

== Distribution ==
This species is endemic to Oahu Island, (Hawaii).
