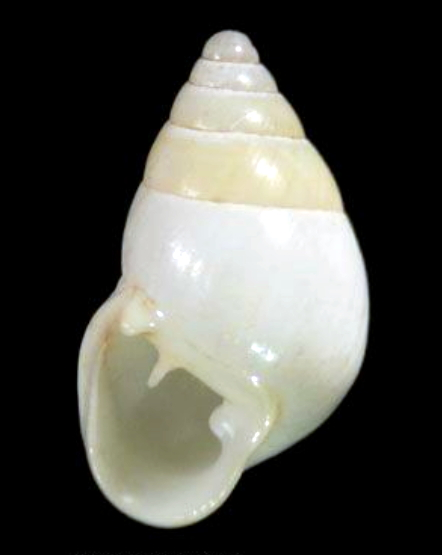
- Sinistral shell of Auriculella pulchra (specimen at the Natural History Museum Rotterdam)

Conservation status
- Data Deficient (IUCN 2.3)

- Critically Imperiled (NatureServe)

Scientific classification
- Kingdom: Animalia
- Phylum: Mollusca
- Class: Gastropoda
- Order: Stylommatophora
- Family: Achatinellidae
- Genus: Auriculella
- Species: A. pulchra

Binomial name
- Auriculella pulchra Pease, 1868

= Auriculella pulchra =

Species of gastropod

Auriculella pulchra is a species of tropical air-breathing land snails, terrestrial pulmonate gastropod mollusks. This species is endemic to Hawaii archipelago in the United States.

== Description ==
The length of the shell attains 10 mm, its diameter 6 mm.

(Original description in French) The shell is solid, oval, and consistently dextral (in contrast with many others in this genus). It is perforated and features distinct longitudinal striae. There are six whorls, which are plano-convex in profile, and the body whorl is slightly inflated. The suture is well-defined, leading to a subauriform (somewhat ear-shaped) aperture.

The peristome is strongly thickened, reflected, and turned backward, with the margins joined by a callous deposit. The parietal lamella is very prominent and projecting. The columella is reflected over the umbilical perforation and is equipped with a thick fold.

In terms of coloration, the shell is white with a greenish transverse band and a brownish margin. There also exists a yellowish variety in which both the peristome and the aperture are white.

== Distribution ==
This species occurs on Hawaii.
