= Auriculella kuesteri =

Scientific classification
- Kingdom: Animalia
- Phylum: Mollusca
- Class: Gastropoda
- Order: Stylommatophora
- Family: Achatinellidae
- Genus: Auriculella
- Species: A. kuesteri

Binomial name
- Auriculella kuesteri (L. Pfeiffer, 1855)

Synonyms
- Tornatellina kuesteri L. Pfeiffer, 1855 superseded combination

Species of land snail

Auriculella kuesteri is a species of tropical air-breathing land snails, terrestrial pulmonate gastropod mollusks, belonging to the family Achatinellidae.

== Description ==
The length of the shell attains 8 mm, its diameter 4 mm.

(Original description in Latin) The shell is subperforate, ovate-turreted in shape, and relatively solid. Its surface is very lightly striated, appearing subopaque and possessing a pale greenish color. The spire is regularly elongated-conic and terminates in a slightly obtuse apex.

The suture is linear and marginated, separating six whorls that are nearly flat. The body whorl slightly exceeds two-fifths of the total length of the shell and is rounded at its base. The aperture is oblique and semi-oval in form.

The parietal lamella is compressed, oblique, and enters deeply into the interior of the shell. The columella is sharply dentate (toothed), while the peristome is simple and acute, featuring a columellar margin that is reflected and spreading.

== Distribution ==
This species occurs on Hawaii.
