= Auriculella chamissoi =

Scientific classification
- Kingdom: Animalia
- Phylum: Mollusca
- Class: Gastropoda
- Order: Stylommatophora
- Family: Achatinellidae
- Genus: Auriculella
- Species: A. chamissoi

Binomial name
- Auriculella chamissoi (L. Pfeiffer, 1855)

Synonyms
- Achatinella (Auriculella) chamissoi L. Pfeiffer, 1855 alternative representation

Species of land snail

Auriculella chamissoi is a species of tropical air-breathing land snails, terrestrial pulmonate gastropod mollusks, belonging to the family Achatinellidae.

== Description ==
The length of the shell attains 8 mm, its diameter 3.5 mm.

(Original description in Latin) The shell is subperforate, oblong, and pyramidal in shape. It is somewhat solid and, when viewed under a lens, reveals finely sculpted spiral striae. It is covered in a brown epidermis (periostracum) that is marked by faint, obsolete streaks.

The spire is elongated-conic and terminates in a somewhat obtuse apex. There are seven and a half whorls, which are relatively flat; the body whorl is nearly equal to two-fifths of the total length of the shell and is slightly compressed at the base.

The aperture is only slightly oblique and is ear-shaped (auriform). The parietal lamella is strong and branches downward on the outer side. The columellar fold is smooth, slightly twisted, and white. Finally, the peristome is whitish and somewhat expanded.

== Distribution ==
This species occurs on Hawaii.
