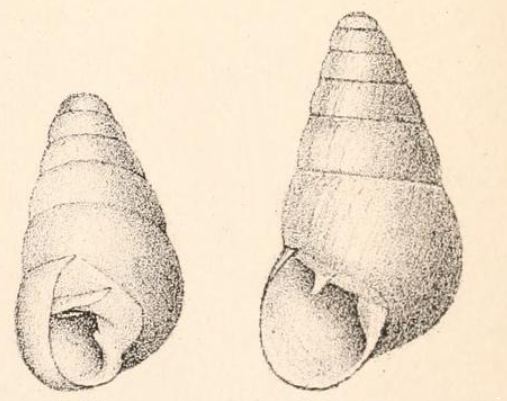
- Original drawings of specimens of Auriculella tantalus

Scientific classification
- Kingdom: Animalia
- Phylum: Mollusca
- Class: Gastropoda
- Order: Stylommatophora
- Family: Achatinellidae
- Genus: Auriculella
- Species: A. tantalus

Binomial name
- Auriculella tantalus Pilsbry & C. M. Cooke, 1915

= Auriculella tantalus =

Species of gastropod

Auriculella tantalus is a species of tropical air-breathing land snails, terrestrial pulmonate gastropod mollusks.

== Description ==
The length of the shell attains 5.9 mm, its diameter 2.8 mm.

(Original description) The shell is sinistral and features a distinct perforation that does not extend deeper than the body whorl. It is very thin, somewhat glossy, and characterized by rather distinct striations. The coloration is typically cinnamon, though in some specimens the final two whorls appear naphthalene yellow. The thin cuticle is prone to disintegration, which produces a pattern of whitish dots and spots across the surface. The apex is relatively obtuse.

There are 6 1/2 whorls in total. The first whorl is convex and glossy, while the subsequent whorls are only very slightly convex. In front of the aperture, the body whorl is very indistinctly subangular, though it is rounded elsewhere with a rotund base. The aperture maintains the typical short, irregularly ovate shape and reveals the external coloration within.

The peristome is thin and expands only slightly toward the outer edge, becoming more pronounced at the base. When viewed in profile, the columellar margin is triangularly dilated and does not lie appressed to the shell; instead, it projects forward at an obtuse angle. The parietal callus is very thin, supporting a high, thin parietal lamella. The columella is vertical and appears very indistinctly biplicate and somewhat excavated at the base when viewed from the front. However, when viewed from an oblique angle within the aperture, the two folds become more distinct. Additionally, a fine keel runs vertically along the face of the columella, extending to its base.

== Distribution ==
This species is endemic to Oahu Island, (Hawaii).
