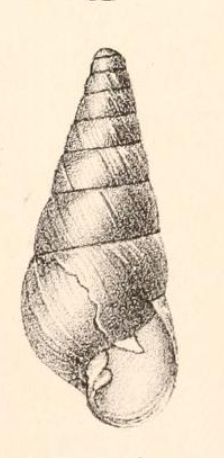
- Drawing of a shell of Auriculella turritella (holotype)

Scientific classification
- Kingdom: Animalia
- Phylum: Mollusca
- Class: Gastropoda
- Order: Stylommatophora
- Family: Achatinellidae
- Genus: Auriculella
- Species: A. turritella

Binomial name
- Auriculella turritella C. M. Cooke, 1915

= Auriculella turritella =

Species of gastropod

Auriculella turritella is a species of tropical air-breathing land snails, terrestrial pulmonate gastropod mollusks.

== Description ==
The length of the shell attains 8.6 mm, its diameter 3.6 mm.

(Original description) The shell is imperforate, dextral, and turrited with an elongate form. It possesses a chestnut color and a rather thin, semidiaphanous texture that lacks a glossy finish. Under a lens, the surface reveals minute and regular striations that follow the lines of growth. The spire is elongately conic and terminates in a somewhat obtuse apex. The suture is marginate and dark chestnut in color, though it is scarcely impressed into the shell's surface.

There are 9 1/2 whorls in total; the embryonic whorls are rounded, while the remaining whorls are flat. These whorls increase slowly and regularly, creating a compact appearance, with the body whorl being somewhat rotund and subsaccate at its base. The aperture is ovate and sits at an angle that is hardly oblique.

Inside the aperture, the parietal lamella is relatively small, whitish, and scarcely oblique. A minute, transparent, and elongate palatal fold is situated deeply within the shell, positioned nearly midway between the columella and the periphery. The columella is twisted and characterized by a thick callus with two strong folds. Of these, the upper lamella is oblique, while the lower is slightly more developed and more horizontal; both extend fully to the margin of the lip.

The lip is rather thin and expanded, featuring a slightly arcuate outer margin and a columellar margin that is reflexed and adnate. A very thin, transparent, and very minutely punctate callus unites the margins.

== Distribution ==
This species is endemic to Oahu Island, (Hawaii).
