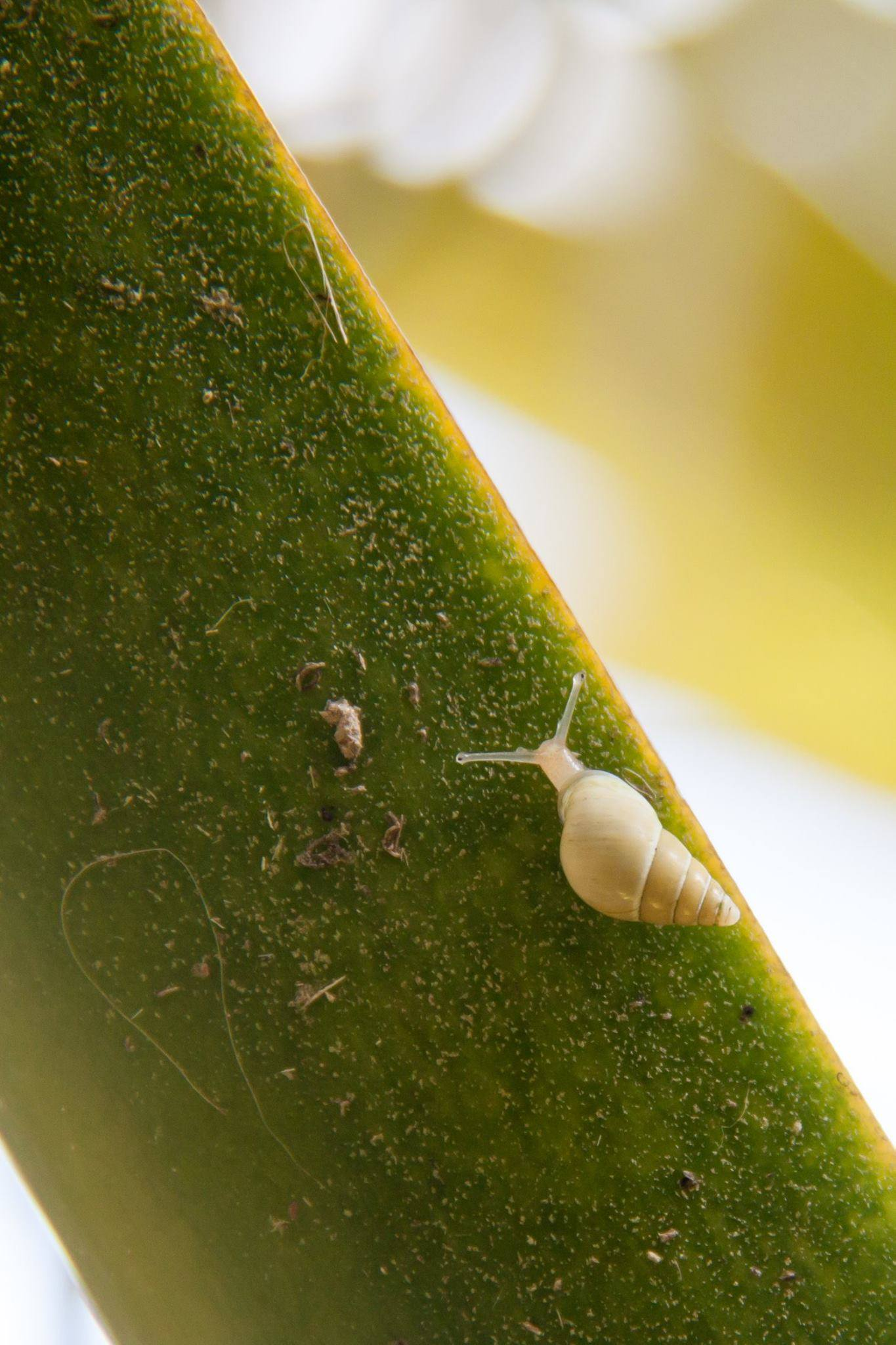

Conservation status
- Extinct (IUCN 2.3)

- Possibly Extinct (NatureServe)

Scientific classification
- Kingdom: Animalia
- Phylum: Mollusca
- Class: Gastropoda
- Order: Stylommatophora
- Family: Achatinellidae
- Genus: Auriculella
- Species: †A. uniplicata

Binomial name
- †Auriculella uniplicata Pease, 1868

Synonyms
- Auriculella jucunda Pilsbry & C. M. Cooke, 1915 superseded rank; Auriculella uniplicata f. jucunda Pilsbry & C. M. Cooke, 1915

= Auriculella uniplicata =

Species of land snail

Auriculella uniplicata is a species of tropical air-breathing land snails, terrestrial pulmonate gastropod mollusks, belonging to the family Achatinellidae.

== Description ==
The length of the shell attains 7 mm, its diameter 4 mm.

(Original description in French) The shell is solid and characterized by an oval-elongated shape, featuring a distinct umbilical perforation. This species is polymorphic in its coiling, appearing indifferently as either dextral or sinistral. This is a fascinating biological detail.

The spire is conic and terminates in a slightly obtuse summit, with a well-marked suture. There are six whorls, which are plano-convex in profile and finely striated in a longitudinal direction. The aperture is slightly oblique and takes a truncated-oval form.

The peristome is strongly thickened, and its margins are joined above the body whorl by a callous deposit. The parietal margin is equipped with a thin lamella, while the columellar margin remains simple, entirely lacking any kind of lamella or fold. Regarding its coloration, the shell is yellowish or light brown, accented by a transverse band of a darker shade.

== Distribution ==
This species is endemic to Hawaii, United States.
