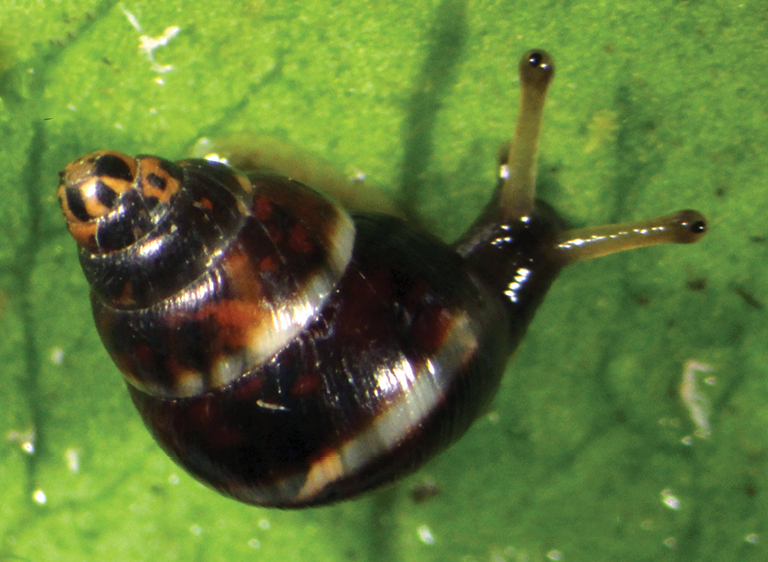
- Live specimen of Auriculella gagneorum
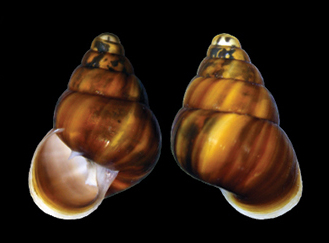
- Shell of Auriculella gagneorum (holotype)

Scientific classification
- Kingdom: Animalia
- Phylum: Mollusca
- Class: Gastropoda
- Order: Stylommatophora
- Family: Achatinellidae
- Genus: Auriculella
- Species: A. gagneorum

Binomial name
- Auriculella gagneorum Yeung, Slapcinsky, E. E. Strong, J. R. Kim & K. A. Hayes, 2020

= Auriculella gagneorum =

Species of gastropod

Auriculella gagneorum is a species of tropical air-breathing land snails, terrestrial pulmonate gastropod mollusks.

== Description ==
The length of the shell attains 4.5 mm, its diameter 3 mm.

(Original description) The shell is sinistral and features inflated whorls with the following average dimensions: a height of 4.8 ± 0.3 mm, a width of 3.2 ± 0.2 mm, and a whorl count of 5.4 ± 0.4. The aperture measures approximately 2.3 ± 0.1 mm in height and 1.7 ± 0.1 mm in width. In juvenile specimens, the columella possesses a strong lamella; however, in adults, this structure is reduced and obscured by a thickening of the inner edge of the lip. Mature individuals do not exhibit a short projection or angular edge at the former site of the columellar lamella. The parietal lamella is frequently undulate, typically featuring three peaks, and extends 0.2 to 0.5 whorls into the aperture.

The shell color varies from white and pale tan to dark brown. These hues may appear as solid colors, or they may be accompanied by irregularly placed axial brown bands or a single peripheral band of pale tan or dark brown. Occasionally, pale tan specimens exhibit two poorly defined dark bands situated on either side of a pale tan peripheral band.R

Reproductive system: the reproductive system is characterized by a long phallus retractor muscle that attaches apically to a short but well-defined epiphallus. The appendix is slightly longer than the phallus and measures two-thirds the diameter of the phallus at its point of attachment. It tapers gently for one-third of its length before remaining narrow until it reaches its terminus. The apical three-quarters of the phallus is broad, tapering slightly both apically and basally, while the basal quarter narrows slightly above the junction with the short atrium. The vagina is notably short.

Radula and dentition: The radula consists of an irregular rachidian flanked on either side by rastriform marginal teeth, a diagnostic feature of the family. Each tooth possesses a long, narrow base that expands gradually over three-quarters of its length. The remaining quarter of the tooth comprises forward-curving cusps. There are three primary long cusps—located at the mesocone, endocone, and ectocone positions—with two or more alternating larger and smaller cusps intercalated between them. The number of teeth per row ranges from 135 to 153.

[2]  This article incorporates text from this source, which is under a CC BY 4.0 license.

== Distribution ==
This species is endemic to Oahu Island, (Hawaii).
