= Auriculella newcombi =

Scientific classification
- Kingdom: Animalia
- Phylum: Mollusca
- Class: Gastropoda
- Order: Stylommatophora
- Family: Achatinellidae
- Genus: Auriculella
- Species: A. newcombi

Binomial name
- Auriculella newcombi (L. Pfeiffer, 1854)

Synonyms
- Achatinella (Auriculella) obeliscus L. Pfeiffer, 1856 nomen nudum; Balea newcombi L. Pfeiffer, 1854 superseded combination

Species of gastropod

Auriculella newcombi is a species of tropical air-breathing land snails, terrestrial pulmonate gastropod mollusks.

== Description ==
The length of the shell attains 7 mm, its diameter 3 mm.

(Original description in Latin) The shell is sinistral (left-handed) and features a very short umbilical cleft (rimate). It is turreted in form, thin in substance, and characterized by a glossy, pellucid surface with fine striations. The coloration is a pale horn-tint, elegantly adorned with a single reddish-brown band. The spire is notably elongated and terminates in a sharp apex.

There are 7 whorls, which are relatively flat in profile. The body whorl constitutes approximately one-quarter of the total shell length; it is rounded at the base and equipped with an oblique lamella situated on the parietal wall of the aperture. The columella is slightly twisted and folded.

The aperture is semi-oval and situated at an oblique angle. The peristome (the edge of the aperture) is thin and slightly expanded. At the upper portion, the columellar margin is dilated and reflexed back over the shell.

== Distribution ==
This species is endemic to Hawaii.
