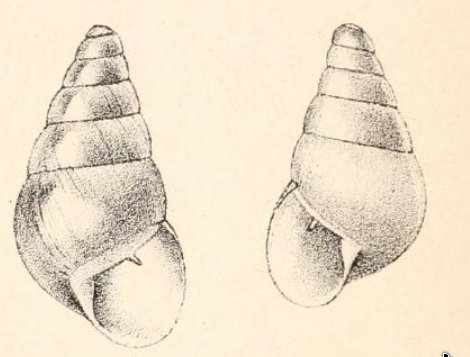
- Drawing of a shell of Auriculella flavida (sinistral and dextral specimens) (holotype)

Scientific classification
- Kingdom: Animalia
- Phylum: Mollusca
- Class: Gastropoda
- Order: Stylommatophora
- Family: Achatinellidae
- Genus: Auriculella
- Species: A. flavida

Binomial name
- Auriculella flavida C. M. Cooke, 1915

= Auriculella flavida =

Species of gastropod

Auriculella flavida is a species of tropical air-breathing land snails, terrestrial pulmonate gastropod mollusks.

== Description ==
The length of the shell attains 6.2 mm, its diameter 3.1 mm.

(Original description) The shell is minutely perforate and can be either dextral (right-handed) or sinistral (left-handed). It is ovately conic in shape and possesses a naphthalene-yellow hue. The structure is very thin, slightly diaphanous, and glossy; when viewed under a lens, the surface appears minutely striate with growth lines and is marked by extremely fine revolving striae. The spire is conic, ending in an obtuse apex. The suture is simple and hardly impressed. There are 6 1/2 whorls, which are slightly convex; the embryonic whorls are rather large and rounded, while the body whorl is rotund and saccate, though it tapers slightly below. The aperture is broadly oval and is scarcely oblique. Inside the aperture, the parietal lamella is white and very small. The columella is nearly straight. The lip is very slightly thickened, featuring an arcuate outer margin and a reflexed columellar margin. Finally, the parietal callus is thin, and the moderate umbilicus is rimate (slit-like).

== Distribution ==
This species is endemic to Molokai Island, (Hawaii).
