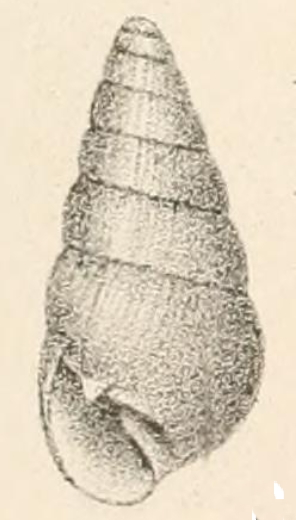
- Original drawing of shell of Auriculella petitiana

Scientific classification
- Kingdom: Animalia
- Phylum: Mollusca
- Class: Gastropoda
- Order: Stylommatophora
- Family: Achatinellidae
- Genus: Auriculella
- Species: A. petitiana

Binomial name
- Auriculella petitiana P (L. Pfeiffer, 1847)

Synonyms
- Tornatellina petitiana L. Pfeiffer, 1847 superseded combination

= Auriculella petitiana =

Species of gastropod

Auriculella petitiana is a species of tropical air-breathing land snails, terrestrial pulmonate gastropod mollusks.

== Description ==
The length of the shell attains 6.3 mm, its diameter 3 mm.

(Original description) The shell is sinistral and conically turrited. It possesses a smooth, glossy, and pellucid texture with a corneous (horn-like) coloration. The spire is elongate, terminating in an apex that is somewhat acute. The suture is narrowly margined, providing a subtle definition between the whorls.

There are 8 whorls that are scarcely convex in profile. The body whorl is nearly equal to one-third of the total shell length and is rotund at its base. The parietal wall of the aperture is furnished with an acute, elevated, white lamella that enters the shell spirally.

The columella is slightly twisted-dentate at its upper portion. The aperture itself is oblique and semioval, featuring a thin white callus within. Finally, the lip is characterized by an acute edge.

== Distribution ==
This species is endemic to Hawaii.
