= Auriculella armata =

Scientific classification
- Kingdom: Animalia
- Phylum: Mollusca
- Class: Gastropoda
- Order: Stylommatophora
- Family: Achatinellidae
- Genus: Auriculella
- Species: A. armata

Binomial name
- Auriculella armata (Mighels, 1845)

Synonyms
- Auriculella westerlundiana Ancey, 1889 junior subjective synonym; Bulimus armatus Mighels, 1845 superseded combination

Species of land snail

Auriculella armata is a species of tropical air-breathing land snails, terrestrial pulmonate gastropod mollusks, belonging to the family Achatinellidae.

== Description ==
The length of the shell attains 8 mm, its diameter 4 mm.

(Original description in Latin) The shell is typically sinistral, though it is rarely found to be dextral. It possesses a conical shape and is colored brown or yellowish, occasionally featuring a light, revolving band just below the suture. The structure is distinctly perforate.

There are five whorls, which are convex in profile. The aperture is oblong-ovate and is equipped with a thin, flexuous, lamellated tooth situated on the transverse (parietal) lip. Additionally, there is a small tooth or fold located on the columellar lip. Finally, the outer lip is thin and slightly reflected.

== Distribution ==
This species occurs on Hawaii.
