= Auriculella crassula =

Conservation status
- Data Deficient (IUCN 2.3)

- Critically Imperiled (NatureServe)

Scientific classification
- Kingdom: Animalia
- Phylum: Mollusca
- Class: Gastropoda
- Order: Stylommatophora
- Family: Achatinellidae
- Genus: Auriculella
- Species: A. crassula

Binomial name
- Auriculella crassula Smith, 1915-1916

Synonyms
- Auriculella ponderosa Ancey, 1889 junior subjective synonym; Auriculella solidissima Bland & W. G. Binney, 1873 nomen nudum

Species of gastropod

Auriculella crassula is a species of air-breathing tropical land snails, terrestrial pulmonate gastropod mollusks in the family Achatinellidae.

== Description ==
The length of the shell attains 7.5 mm, its diameter 4 mm

(Original description in Latin) The shell is typically sinistral (left-handed), though it is occasionally found to be dextral (right-handed). It possesses an ovate-conic shape and a solid structure. The shell is distinctly perforate and lacks a glossy luster, exhibiting a pale brown coloration.

There are six and a half whorls, which are nearly flat in profile. The aperture is a dull, dirty white on the interior. The peristome is thickened and slightly dilated at its base; it is notably fortified by a small, prominent tubercle located at the junction where it meets the body whorl. Finally, the columella is thick and somewhat reflected, though it lacks any visible fold.

== Distribution ==
This species is endemic to Hawaii.
