= Auriculella amoena =

Scientific classification
- Kingdom: Animalia
- Phylum: Mollusca
- Class: Gastropoda
- Order: Stylommatophora
- Family: Achatinellidae
- Genus: Auriculella
- Species: A. amoena

Binomial name
- Auriculella amoena (L. Pfeiffer, 1855)

Synonyms
- Achatinella (Frickella) amoena L. Pfeiffer, 1855 (basionym)

Species of land snail

Auriculella amoena is a species of tropical air-breathing land snails, terrestrial pulmonate gastropod mollusks, belonging to the family Achatinellidae.

== Description ==
The length of the shell attains 11.5 mm, its diameter 5 mm.

(Original description in Latin) The shell is subperforate, possesses an ovate-oblong shape, and is thin in texture. It is finely striated, glossy, and luteous (yellowish) in color, marked by a single, faintly obsolete brown band. The spire is convexo-conic and terminates in a slightly obtuse apex.

The suture is impressed, separating six and a half whorls that are somewhat convex. The body whorl is nearly equal to three-sevenths of the total length of the shell and is slightly attenuated at its base.

The aperture is oblique and semi-oval in form. The parietal lamina is positioned somewhat transversely. The columellar fold is subduplicate and callous, and it is superimposed upon a spiral lamina. Finally, the peristome is simple and straight.

== Distribution ==
This species occurs on Hawaii.
