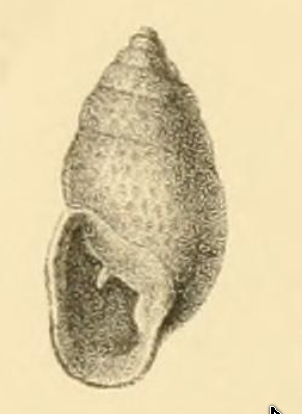
- Drawing of a shell of Auriculella malleata (holotype)

Conservation status
- Data Deficient (IUCN 2.3)

- Critically Imperiled (NatureServe)

Scientific classification
- Kingdom: Animalia
- Phylum: Mollusca
- Class: Gastropoda
- Order: Stylommatophora
- Family: Achatinellidae
- Genus: Auriculella
- Species: A. malleata

Binomial name
- Auriculella malleata Ancey, 1904

= Auriculella malleata =

Species of gastropod

Auriculella malleata is a species of tropical air-breathing land snails, terrestrial pulmonate gastropod mollusks.

== Description ==
The length of the shell attains 9 mm, its diameter 4.25 mm.

(Original description in Latin) The shell is solid, perforated, and oblong-conoid in shape. It is shining yet opaque and white in color, with an apex that is generally reddish or brownish, though sometimes white. It is left-handed (sinistral) and, when viewed under a lens, is slightly impressed with light growth lines. The spire is somewhat elongated and convexly conical, ending in a minute, rather blunt apex. There are 6 1/2 to 7 whorls; the first few are slightly convex, while the following ones are flattened, often marked by several elevated ridges that descend forward—similar to the style of many Lymnaea snails—and are very often 'malleated' (appearing as if hammered).The aperture is somewhat ear-shaped (subauriform), angled at the top and flared and receding at the bottom. It is positioned obliquely and is armed with a relatively thin to moderate parietal layer and a columellar fold that is not very prominent and somewhat blunt, occasionally appearing indistinctly doubled. The peristome (lip) is thick and expanded at the base, with a margin on the outside. The margins are joined by a callus that is either swollen or bears a small tubercle at the junction; the outer lip is flattened and slightly pushed forward in the middle.

== Distribution ==
This species is endemic to Oahu Island, (Hawaii).
