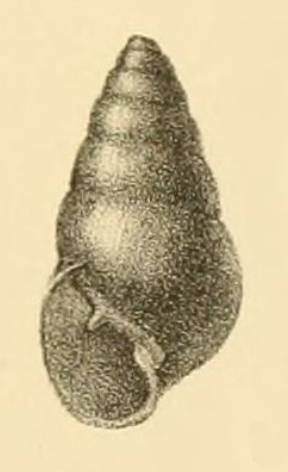
- Drawing of a shell of Auriculella canalifera (holotype)

Conservation status
- Data Deficient (IUCN 2.3)

Scientific classification
- Kingdom: Animalia
- Phylum: Mollusca
- Class: Gastropoda
- Order: Stylommatophora
- Family: Achatinellidae
- Genus: Auriculella
- Species: A. canalifera

Binomial name
- Auriculella canalifera Ancey, 1904

= Auriculella canalifera =

Species of gastropod

Auriculella canalifera is a species of tropical air-breathing land snails, terrestrial pulmonate gastropod mollusks.

== Description ==
The length of the shell attains 6.75 mm, its diameter 3.6 mm.

(Original description in Latin) The shell is left-handed (sinistral), imperforate (lacking a central hole), and ovate-conic in shape. It is somewhat thin and shining, marked with light, oblique, and faint growth lines. The color is either a uniform tawny-yellow, or it is encircled by a dark brown band in the middle of the body whorl; alternatively, it can be a deep tawny-chestnut color surrounded by a whitish peripheral band that follows just above the suture. The spire is conical and quite elongated, ending in a blunt apex. There are 6 1/4 whorls which are rather flattened, and the suture is pressed closely against them. The body whorl is dilated, rounded, and shortened, showing no upward slant. The aperture is oblique and irregularly oval, widening and notched at the bottom; it is armed with a compressed, whitish, medium-sized parietal layer that becomes weaker as it goes inward. The columella is pressed flat and slightly twisted into a fold; this fold is whitish and ends on the outside in a small, erect spine. When viewed obliquely, the columella appears minutely double-curved (bisinuate). The peristome (lip) is thin, barely thickened except at the columella, and is slightly expanded. The margins of the lip are joined by a simple, shining callus that does not bear any tubercles.

== Distribution ==
This species is endemic to Molokai Island, (Hawaii).
