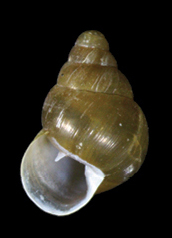

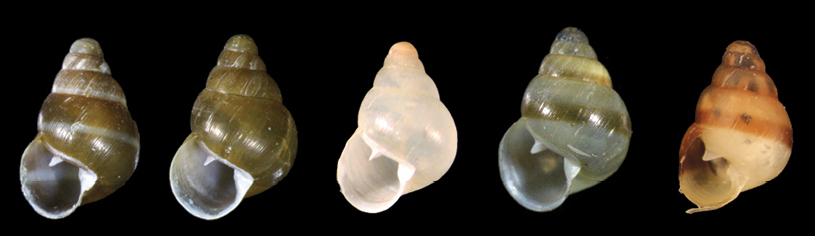

Conservation status
- Data Deficient (IUCN 2.3)

- Critically Imperiled (NatureServe)

Scientific classification
- Kingdom: Animalia
- Phylum: Mollusca
- Class: Gastropoda
- Order: Stylommatophora
- Family: Achatinellidae
- Genus: Auriculella
- Species: A. perpusilla

Binomial name
- Auriculella perpusilla Smith, 1873

= Auriculella perpusilla =

Species of gastropod

Auriculella perpusilla is a species of tropical air-breathing land snails, terrestrial pulmonate gastropod mollusks.

This species is endemic to Hawaii.

== Description ==
(Original description in Latin) The shell is small, left-handed (sinistral), and shortly ovate-conic in shape. It is perforated, fragile, and horn-colored. There are 5 slightly convex whorls separated by a simple suture. The aperture is subcircular, and the parietal wall features a thin layer (lamina). The peristome is thin and slightly dilated, while the columella is not folded and is somewhat reflected.

Auriculella perpusilla is incredibly small, most adult shells reaching a height of around 6 millimeters.

Their thin shell has 5 strongly convex whorls with low spires and weakly reflected apertures.

== Distribution and habitat ==
This species is endemic to the island of Oahu, Hawaii. In the past, Auriculella perpusilla inhabited wide parts of Eastern and North-Eastern Oahu throughout the Koolau Mountain Range. This land snail was prevalent in the wet, rain-abundant forest-mountain regions. Today, this species has been only recorded in a specific mountain region near Honolulu.
