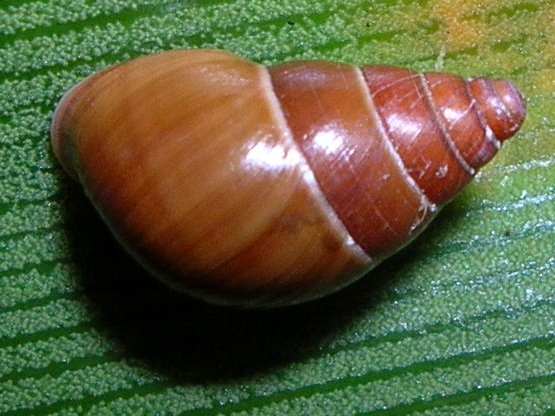
- An unidentified species of Auriculella from Hawaii

Scientific classification
- Kingdom: Animalia
- Phylum: Mollusca
- Class: Gastropoda
- Order: Stylommatophora
- Family: Achatinellidae
- Subfamily: Auriculellinae
- Genus: Auriculella; Pfeiffer, 1854

Type species
- Partula auricula A. Férussac, 1821

Synonyms
- Achatinella (Auriculella) L. Pfeiffer, 1854 superseded rank; Achatinella (Frickella) L. Pfeiffer, 1854 junior subjective synonym

= Auriculella =

Genus of gastropods

Auriculella is a genus of air-breathing tropical land snails, terrestrial pulmonate gastropod mollusks in the family Achatinellidae.

Auriculella is the type genus of the subfamily Auriculellinae.

== General characteristics ==
(Original description in Latin) The shell is subperforate and possesses an oblong-conic shape. The apertural wall is armed with a spirally entering lamella, while the columellar fold is situated superiorly, appearing either tooth-like in form or, in some specimens, nearly obsolete. Finally, the peristome is slightly expanded.

== Distribution ==
They are endemic to Hawaii (United States) and several are extinct. They are oviparous (egg laying) and hermaphroditic. Among achatinellid snails, they are unique in the fact that they are not restricted to living on plants endemic to the Hawaiian islands. They have been known to relatively thrive on non-native plants such as ginger and night jasmine.

== Species ==
Species within the genus Auriculella include:

- Auriculella ambusta Pease, 1868
- Auriculella amoena (L. Pfeiffer, 1855)
- Auriculella armata (Mighels, 1845)
- Auriculella auricula (A. Férussac, 1821)
- Auriculella brunnea E. A. Smith, 1873
- Auriculella canalifera Ancey, 1904
- Auriculella castanea (L. Pfeiffer, 1853)
- Auriculella cerea (L. Pfeiffer, 1855)
- Auriculella chamissoi (L. Pfeiffer, 1855)
- Auriculella crassula E. A. Smith, 1873
- Auriculella diaphana E. A. Smith, 1873
- Auriculella expansa Pease, 1868
- Auriculella flavida C. M. Cooke, 1915
- Auriculella gagneorum Yeung, Slapcinsky, E. E. Strong, J. R. Kim & K. A. Hayes, 2020
- Auriculella kuesteri (L. Pfeiffer, 1855)
- Auriculella lanaiensis C. M. Cooke, 1915
- Auriculella malleata Ancey, 1904
- Auriculella minuta C. M. Cooke & Pilsbry, 1915
- Auriculella montana C. M. Cooke, 1915
- Auriculella newcombi (L. Pfeiffer, 1854)
- Auriculella olivacea C. M. Cooke, 1915
- Auriculella perpusilla E. A. Smith, 1873
- Auriculella perversa C. M. Cooke, 1915
- Auriculella petitiana (L. Pfeiffer, 1847)
- Auriculella pulchra Pease, 1868
- Auriculella serrula C. M. Cooke, 1915
- Auriculella straminea C. M. Cooke, 1915
- Auriculella tantalus Pilsbry & C. M. Cooke, 1915
- Auriculella tenella Ancey, 1889
- Auriculella tenuis E. A. Smith, 1873
- Auriculella turritella C. M. Cooke, 1915
- Auriculella uniplicata Pease, 1868

== Synonyms ==
- Auriculella jucunda Pilsbry & C. M. Cooke, 1915 : synonym of Auriculella uniplicata f. jucunda Pilsbry & C. M. Cooke, 1915 : synonym of Auriculella uniplicata Pease, 1868 (superseded rank)
- Auriculella jucunda Bland & W. G. Binney, 1873 (nomen nudum)
- Auriculella obliqua Ancey, 1892 : synonym of Auriculella ambusta obliqua Ancey, 1892 (superseded rank)
- Auriculella patula E. A. Smith, 1873 : synonym of Auriculella auricula (A. Férussac, 1821) (junior subjective synonym)
- Auriculella pellucida Gulick, 1905 (nomen nudum)
- Auriculella perkinsi Sykes, 1900 : synonym of Auriculella auricula (A. Férussac, 1821) (junior subjective synonym)
- Auriculella ponderosa Ancey, 1889 : synonym of Auriculella crassula E. A. Smith, 1873 (junior subjective synonym)
- Auriculella solidissima Bland & W. G. Binney, 1873 : synonym of Auriculella crassula E. A. Smith, 1873 (nomen nudum)
- Auriculella triplicata Pease, 1868 : synonym of Auriculella auricula (A. Férussac, 1821) (junior subjective synonym)
- Auriculella umbilicata Ancey, 1889 : synonym of Tornatellaria umbilicata (Ancey, 1889) (superseded combination)
- Auriculella westerlundiana Ancey, 1889 : synonym of Auriculella armata (Mighels, 1845) (junior subjective synonym)

== Gallery ==
=== Shells ===
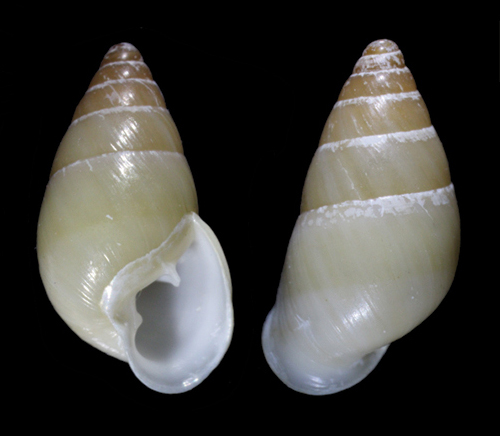
Auriculella auricula

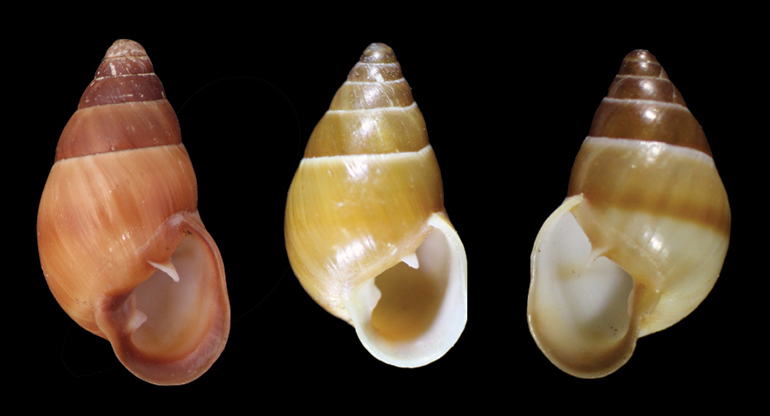
Auriculella auricula variation

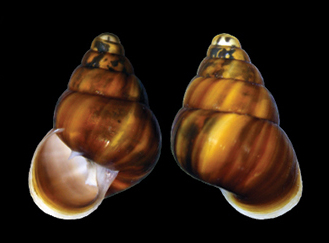
Auriculella gagneorum

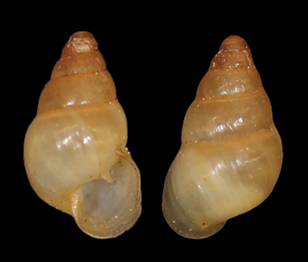
Auriculella minuta

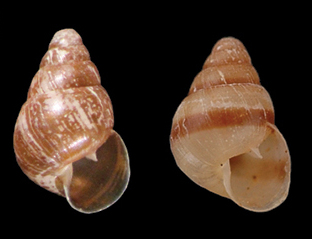
Auriculella minuta variation

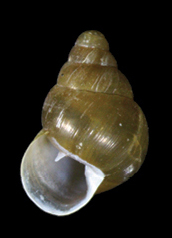
Auriculella perpusilla

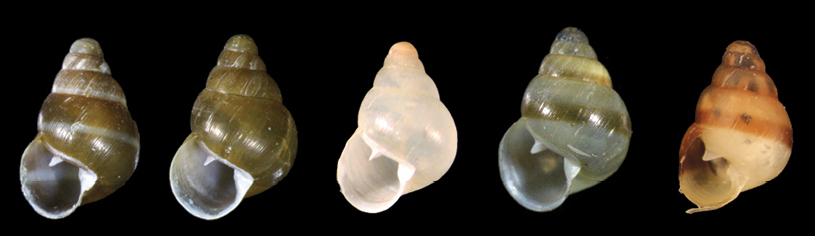
Auriculella perpusilla variation

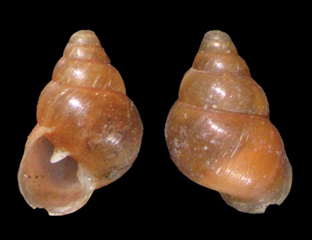
Auriculella perversa

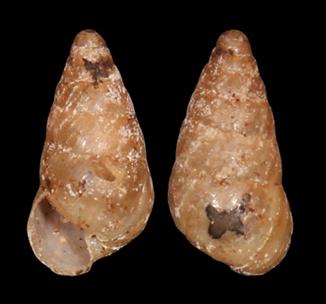
Auriculella tenella

=== Live individuals ===
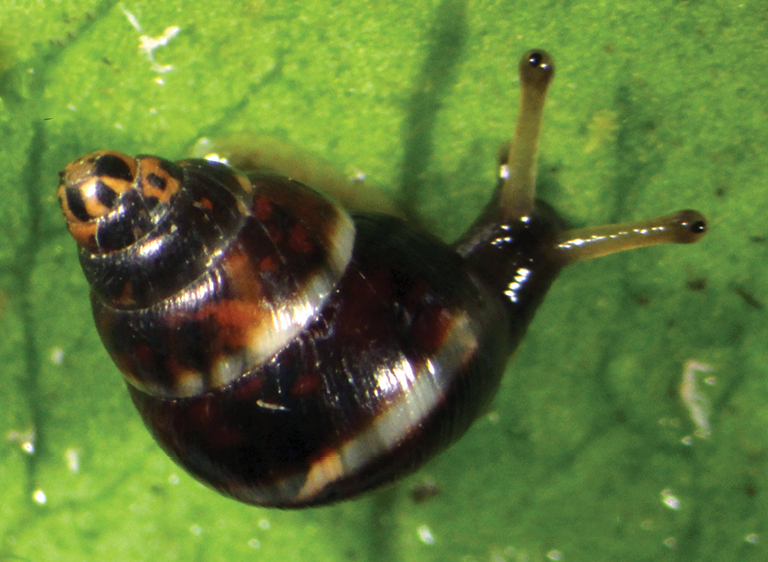
Auriculella gagneorum

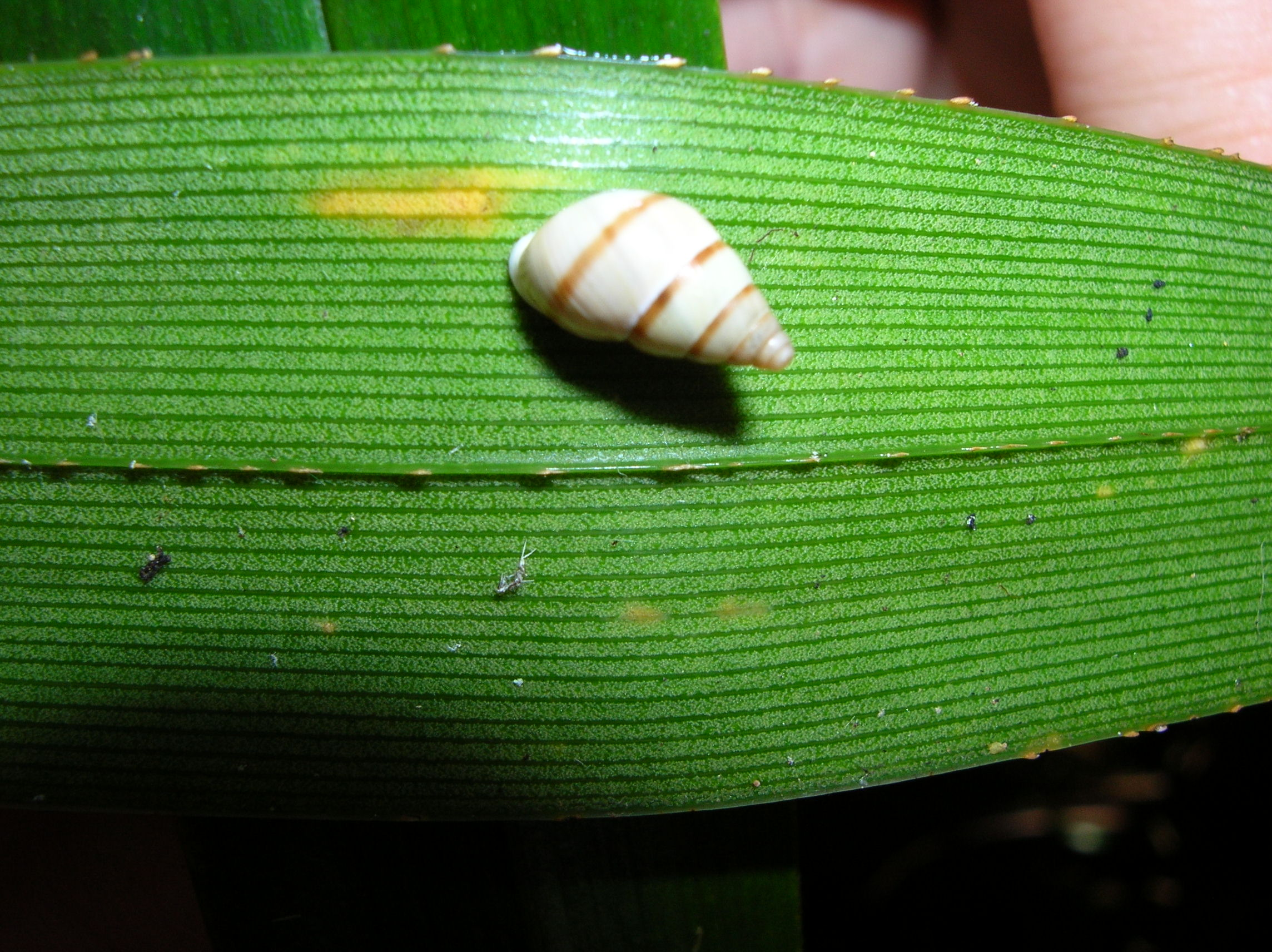
Unidentified species

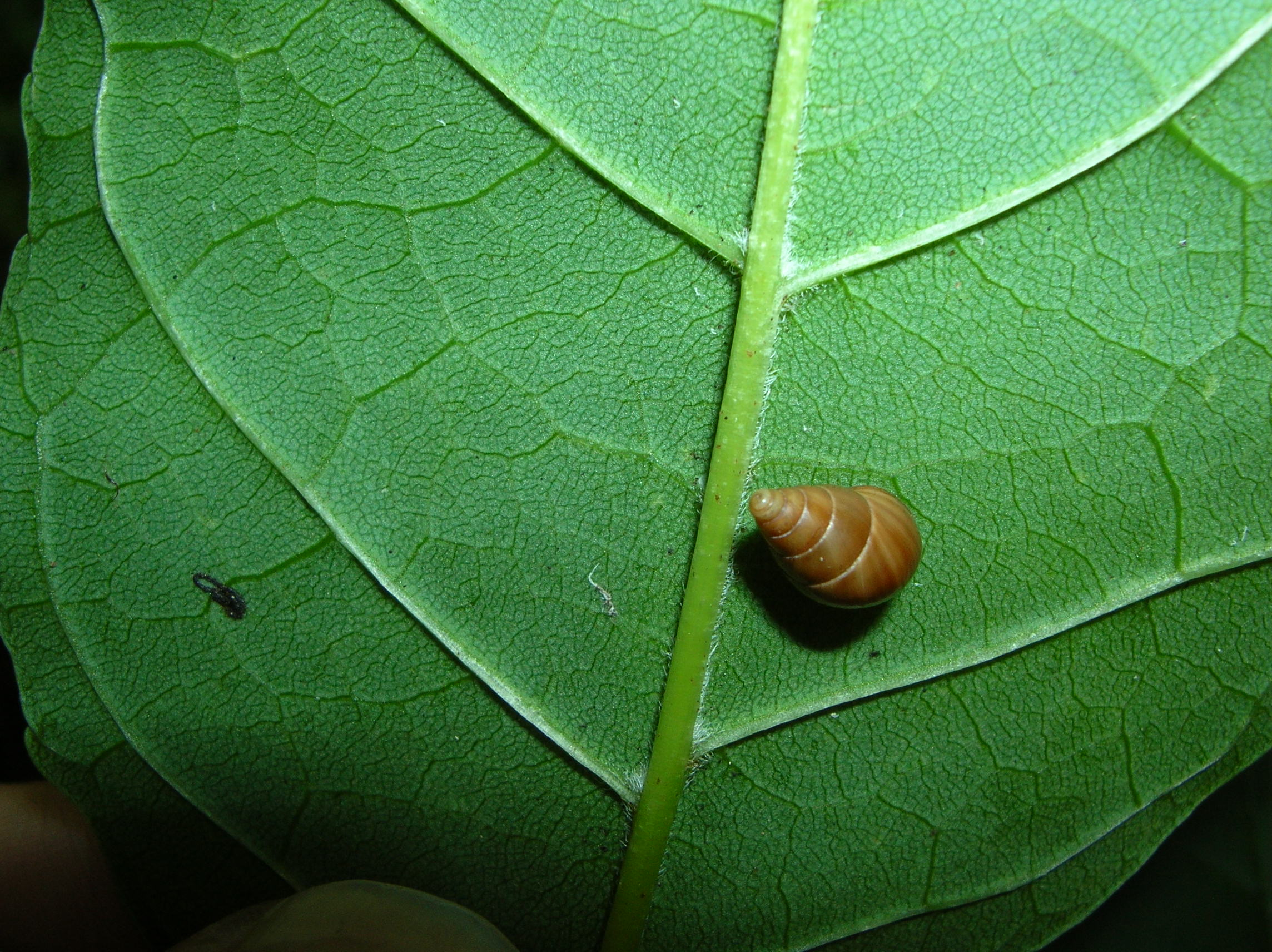
Unidentified species

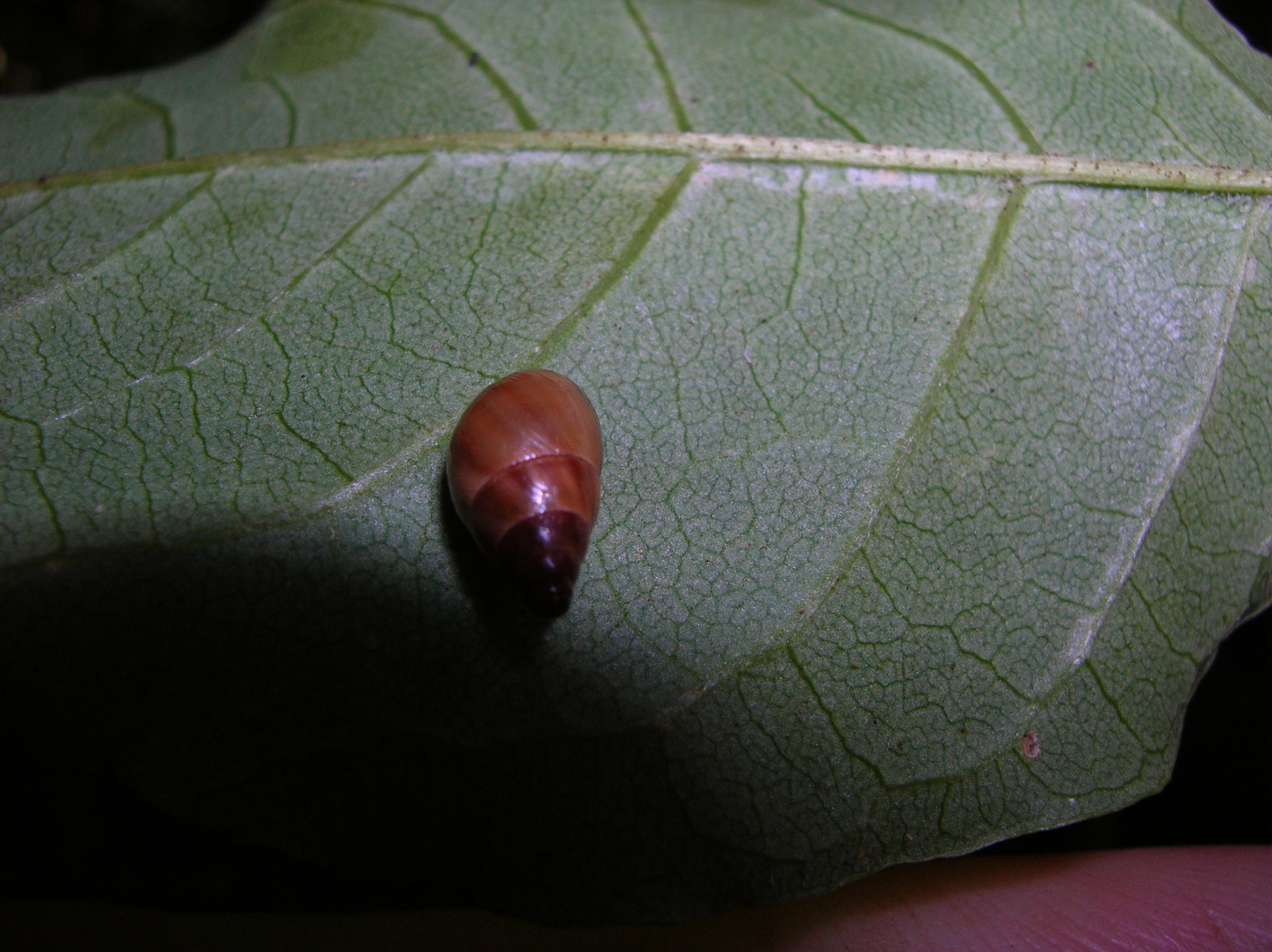
Unidentified species

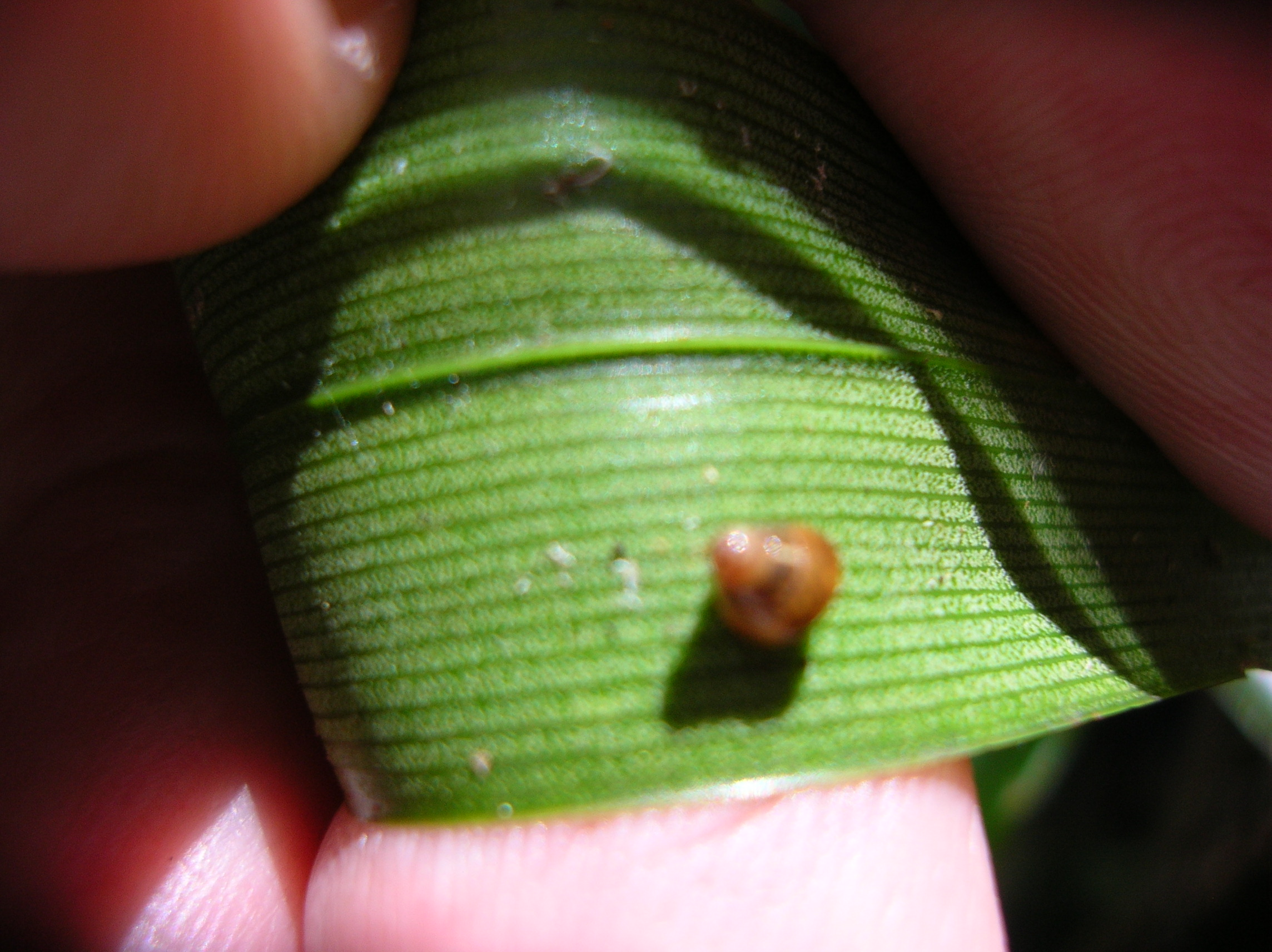
Unidentified species

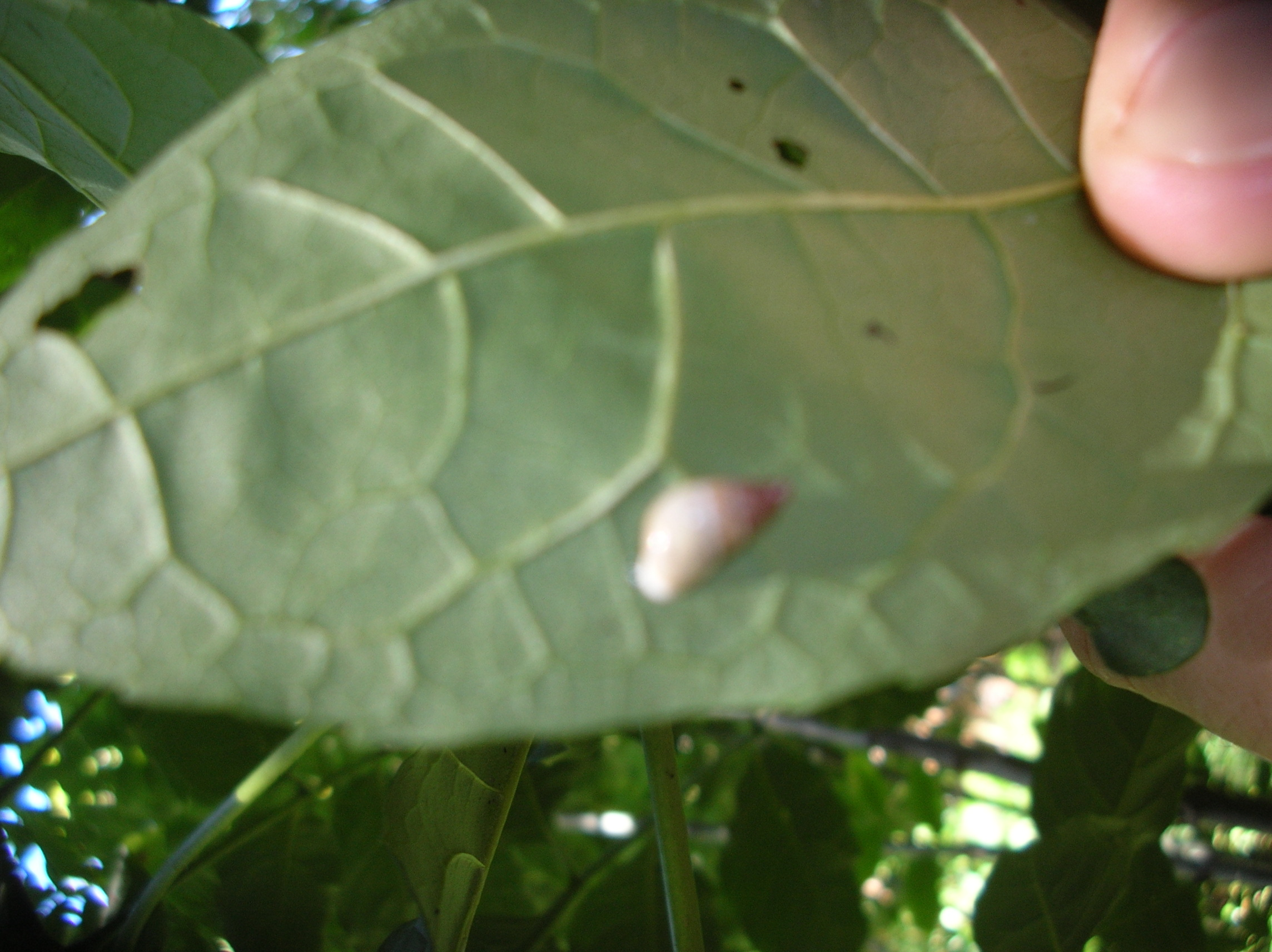
Unidentified species

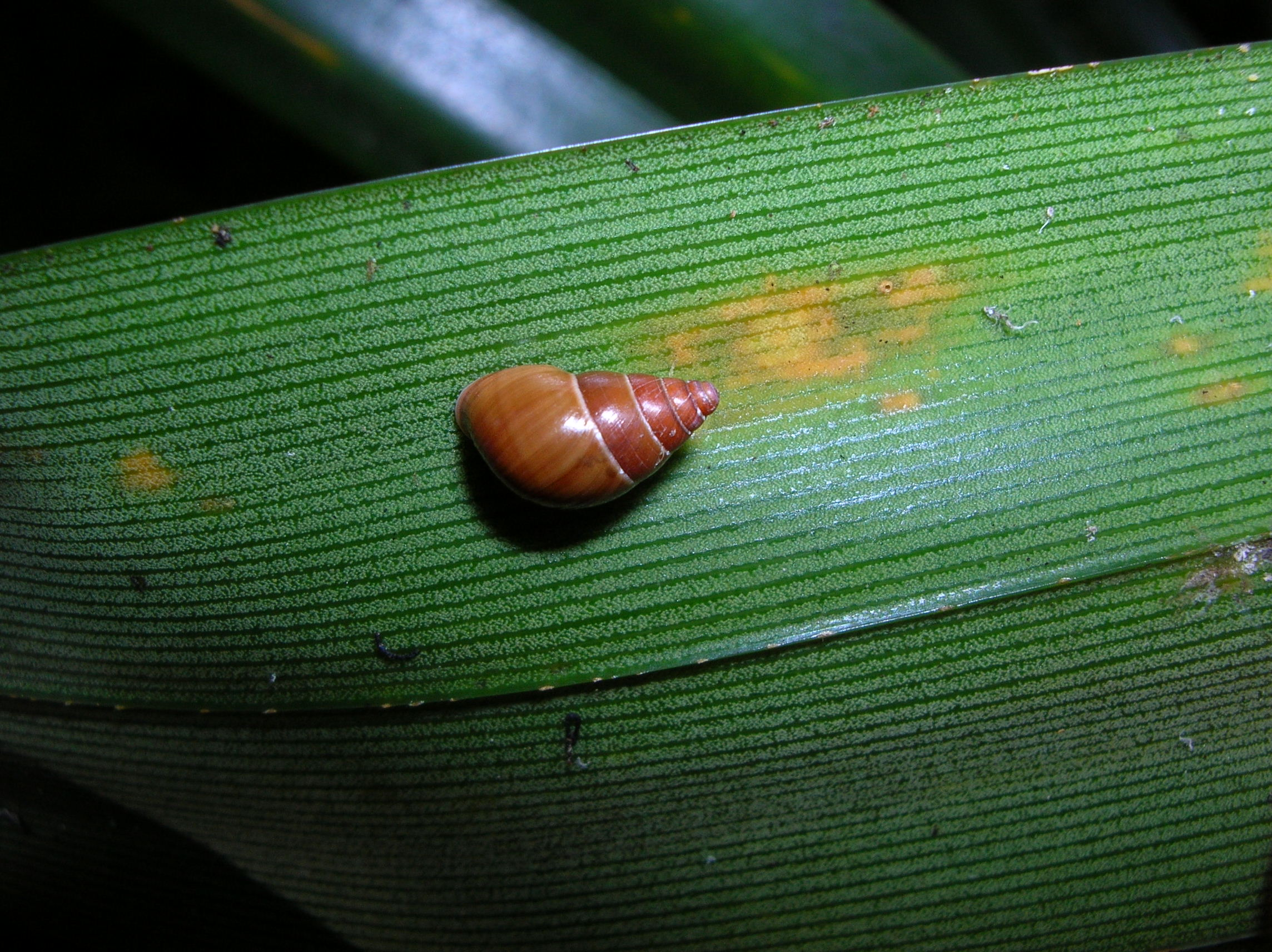
Unidentified species
