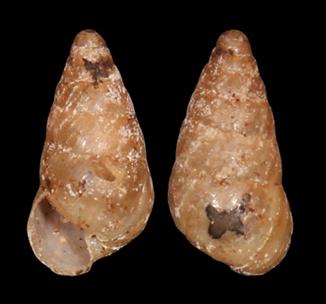

Conservation status
- Data Deficient (IUCN 2.3)

- Critically Imperiled (NatureServe)

Scientific classification
- Kingdom: Animalia
- Phylum: Mollusca
- Class: Gastropoda
- Order: Stylommatophora
- Family: Achatinellidae
- Genus: Auriculella
- Species: A. tenella

Binomial name
- Auriculella tenella Ancey, 1889

= Auriculella tenella =

Species of gastropod

Auriculella tenella is a species of tropical air-breathing land snail, terrestrial pulmonate gastropod mollusc. This species is endemic to the United States.

== Description ==
Auriculella tenella's shell can be described to have a sinistral shape with puffed up whorls. As for color it can be seen primarily as a shade of brown that has streaks of red and may have a single band of a darker hue of brown. As for dimensions, the average height of its shell is measured to about 5.6 millimeters while its width is around 3 millimeters.

== Distribution and habitat ==
Auriculella tenella can be located on Waianae mountains on the Hawaiian island, Oahu. They primarily reside in several trees, making them arboreal, and other plant life such as small plants (Brossaisia, Cordyline, Freycinetia aborea, Lantana, Pelea, Sadleria cyatheoides, Bidens, Coprosma, Euphorbia, Psychotria, Ilex, Philodendron), ferns, tree trunks (Metrosideros) near or on stream banks. But the species has also been seen on fallen dead leaves, tree bark, and stones on the ground. They last were found on the Mount Kaala Area Reserve in 1987 Their habitat is safeguarded and prioritized by the military and state in order to preserve the population of the species and other endemic animals of Hawaiʻi.

== Status ==
Auriculella tenella is currently considered a rare species according to Hawaiian malacologists and gathered heritage data. They are also considered imperiled globally to the Hawaii Heritage Program Rank.
