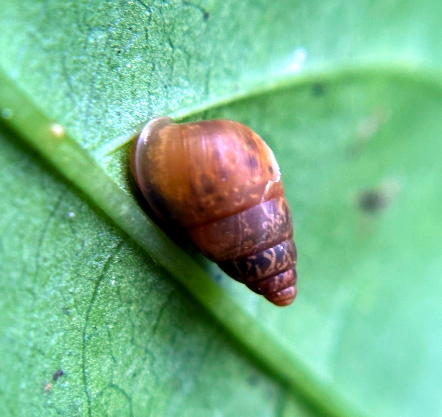
- Live specimen of Auriculella diaphana

Conservation status
- Data Deficient (IUCN 2.3)

Scientific classification
- Kingdom: Animalia
- Phylum: Mollusca
- Class: Gastropoda
- Order: Stylommatophora
- Family: Achatinellidae
- Genus: Auriculella
- Species: A. diaphana

Binomial name
- Auriculella diaphana Smith, 1915-1916

= Auriculella diaphana =

Species of gastropod

Auriculella diaphana is a species of air-breathing tropical land snails, terrestrial pulmonate gastropod mollusks in the family Achatinellidae.

Subspecies

- Auriculella diaphana cacuminis Pilsbry & C. M. Cooke, 1915
- Auriculella diaphana diaphana E. A. Smith, 1873

== Description ==
The length of the shell attains 7 mm, its diameter 4 mm

(Original description in Latin) The shell is sinistral (left-handed) and possesses an ovate-conic shape. It is characterized by being extremely thin and having a horn-like (corneous) texture. The surface is marked by brown streaks and is obscurely encircled around the middle of the body whorl by a dark brown zone.

There are five and a half whorls, which are slightly convex, and the suture is simple in form. The peristome is thin and only slightly dilated. The columella is scarcely folded and somewhat reflected, a configuration that forms a small umbilical fissure. It is joined to the lip by an extremely thin callous deposit. Finally, the parietal lamina is thin.

== Distribution ==
This species is endemic to Hawaii.
