= Auriculella castanea =

Conservation status
- Data Deficient (IUCN 2.3)

- Critically Imperiled (NatureServe)

Scientific classification
- Kingdom: Animalia
- Phylum: Mollusca
- Class: Gastropoda
- Order: Stylommatophora
- Family: Achatinellidae
- Genus: Auriculella
- Species: A. castanea

Binomial name
- Auriculella castanea (Pfeiffer, 1853)

Species of gastropod

Auriculella castanea is a species of air-breathing tropical land snails, terrestrial pulmonate gastropod mollusks in the family Achatinellidae. This species is endemic to Oahu in the Hawaiian Islands.

== Description ==
Auriculella castanea has a sinistral shell. These snails are typically small and brown. The length of this species is similar to Auriculella Tenuis. The shell typically measures 9mm in length and 4mm in diameter. The interior of the penis area exhibits a thin-walled tube like appearance.

== Distribution and habitat ==
Auriculella castanea is endemic to Oahu in the Hawaiian Islands. They are rare snails usually found on Mt. Ka'ala, the highest mountain on the island of Oahu. This mountain has a rocky and muddy landscape and a lowland forest with 1,100 acres.

== Conservation ==
Mt. Ka'ala is managed to protect Hawaii's plants and animals including Auriculella castanea. The management programs consist of controlling feral pigs and non-native weeds, including other attempts at expanding and enhancing this biodiverse environment.
