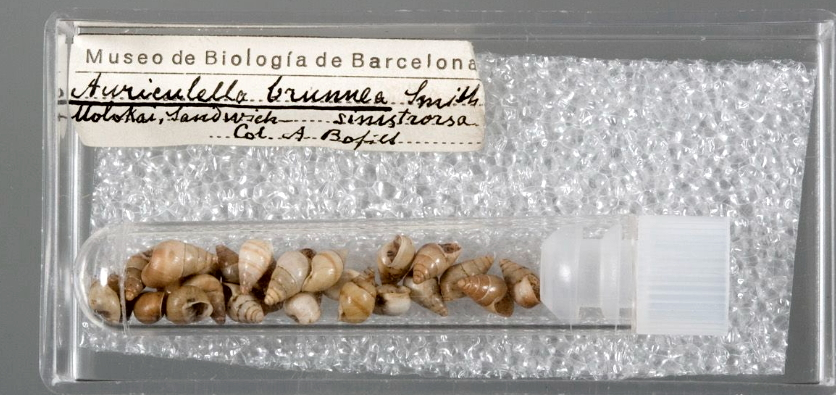
- Shells of Auriculella brunnea (specimens at th Museu de Ciències Naturals de Barcelona)

Scientific classification
- Kingdom: Animalia
- Phylum: Mollusca
- Class: Gastropoda
- Order: Stylommatophora
- Family: Achatinellidae
- Genus: Auriculella
- Species: A. brunnea

Binomial name
- Auriculella brunnea E. A. Smith, 1873

= Auriculella brunnea =

Species of gastropod

Auriculella brunnea is a species of air-breathing tropical land snail, a terrestrial pulmonate gastropod mollusc in the family Achatinellidae.

== Description ==
The length of the shell attains 8 mm, its diameter 4 mm

(Original description in Latin) The shell is conic-ovate in shape and possesses a sinistral (left-handed) coil. It is subperforate, glossy, and exhibits a rich chestnut color. The suture is simple and is encircled by a narrow white band.

The shell consists of seven whorls that are slightly convex, the first two of which are polished and smooth. The apex is somewhat obtuse. The aperture is dark brown in color, while the parietal lamina is white and thin.

The peristome is slightly dilated and is joined to the columella by a thin, whitish callous deposit. Finally, the columella is slightly reflected and barely exhibits a fold.

== Distribution ==
This species is endemic to the Hawaiian Islands.
