= Auriculella tenuis =

Scientific classification
- Kingdom: Animalia
- Phylum: Mollusca
- Class: Gastropoda
- Order: Stylommatophora
- Family: Achatinellidae
- Genus: Auriculella
- Species: A. tenuis

Binomial name
- Auriculella tenuis Smith, 1873

Species of gastropod

Auriculella tenuis is a species of tropical air-breathing land snails, terrestrial pulmonate gastropod mollusks.

Variety

- Auriculella tenuis var. solida Ancey, 1889: synonym of Auriculella castanea (L. Pfeiffer, 1853) (junior subjective synonym)

This species is endemic to Hawaii.

== Description ==
The length of the shell attains 9 mm, its diameter 4 mm.

(Original description in Latin) The shell is left-handed (sinistral), very elongated and conical in shape, and slightly perforated. It is thin, somewhat translucent, and lightly marked with striated growth lines. The color is brownish-horn, encircled by a pale band around the middle of the body whorl. There are 8 1/2 whorls, which are scarcely convex, and the apex is somewhat blunt. The aperture is small, and the peristome is very slightly dilated. The parietal wall (the 'ceiling' of the aperture) is somewhat calloused at the aperture. There is a double columellar fold, which is slightly reflected, along with a very thin callus.

== Distribution ==
This species occurs on Oahu, Hawaii.
