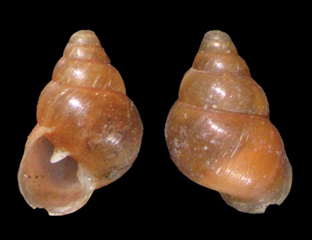
- Specimens of Auriculella perversa

Scientific classification
- Kingdom: Animalia
- Phylum: Mollusca
- Class: Gastropoda
- Order: Stylommatophora
- Family: Achatinellidae
- Genus: Auriculella
- Species: A. perversa

Binomial name
- Auriculella perversa C. M. Cooke, 1915

= Auriculella perversa =

Species of gastropod

Auriculella perversa is a species of tropical air-breathing land snails, terrestrial pulmonate gastropod mollusks.

== Description ==
The length of the shell attains 4.5 mm, its diameter 3 mm.

(Original description) The shell is minutely perforate and sinistral (left-handed), featuring a broadly ovate shape. It is thin, slightly translucent, and a uniform dark chestnut color. Under a lens, the surface reveals minute striations that follow the lines of growth. The spire is conic with an obtuse summit and a minute, pale apex. The suture is deeply impressed and narrowly margined. There are 5 1/2 convex whorls, the last of which is ventricose and becomes saccate at the base.

The aperture is slightly oblique, diagonal, and irregularly ovate. Deep within, the columella possesses a minute fold; when viewed under a lens, a second fold appears near the outer margin, extending toward the inner margin of the lip at the base. The lip is relatively thin and expanded, with a curved outer margin. The columellar margin is reflexed over the minute, subcircular umbilicus, and both margins are united by a thin, transparent callus.

Reproductive system: The phallus retractor muscle is relatively short and attaches apically to a short, poorly defined epiphallus. The appendix is equal in length to the phallus and measures slightly over half the diameter of the phallus at its point of attachment. This appendix narrows abruptly at one-third of its length and remains narrow until it reaches its terminus. The phallus itself is broad, narrowing only slightly as it joins the short atrium. Finally, the vagina is notably short.

Radula and dentition: The radula features an irregular rachidian tooth flanked on either side by rastriform marginal teeth, which serves as a diagnostic trait for the family. Each tooth possesses a long, narrow base that expands gradually over three-quarters of its length. As the tooth reaches the final quarter of its length, it transitions into forward-curving cusps. There are three primary long cusps located at the mesocone, endocone, and ectocone positions; these are interspersed with two or more alternating larger and smaller intercalated cusps. On average, there are approximately $$127 teeth per row.

== Distribution ==
This species is endemic to Oahu Island, (Hawaii).
