= Lamella (gastropod) =

In malacology, a lamella (plural: lamellae) is a specific type of fold or tooth located on the inner boundary of the aperture.

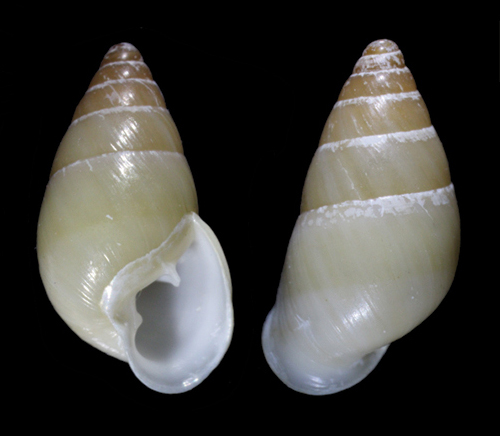
Auriculella auricula with a strong and smooth parietal lamella

== Types ==
One can discern following types:

- parietal lamella: positioned on the wall that forms the inner boundary of the aperture.
- columellar lamella: positioned on the columella (central axis) - sometimes only on juveniles.
- palatal lamella: positioned on the outer lip.

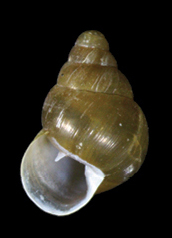
Auriculella perpusilla with a smooth palatal lamella

== Functional Purposes ==
- defense: The lamella narrows the entrance to the shell, making it much harder for small predators (like beetles or specialized "snail-eating" larvae) to crawl inside and reach the snail's soft body.
- water retention: By narrowing the aperture, the lamella helps reduce evaporation, allowing the snail to survive dry periods by keeping moisture trapped inside the shell.
- structural guidance: It acts as a guide for the snail's body as it retracts or emerges, often ensuring the soft tissue is positioned correctly against the columella.

== Identification in taxonomy ==
the parietal lamella is a key diagnostic feature (such as in the genus Auriculella), .

- "valid" or "strong": a thick, obvious ridge.
- "obsolete": a ridge that is barely visible or has disappeared.
- branched": a complex lamella that splits into two or more ridges.
