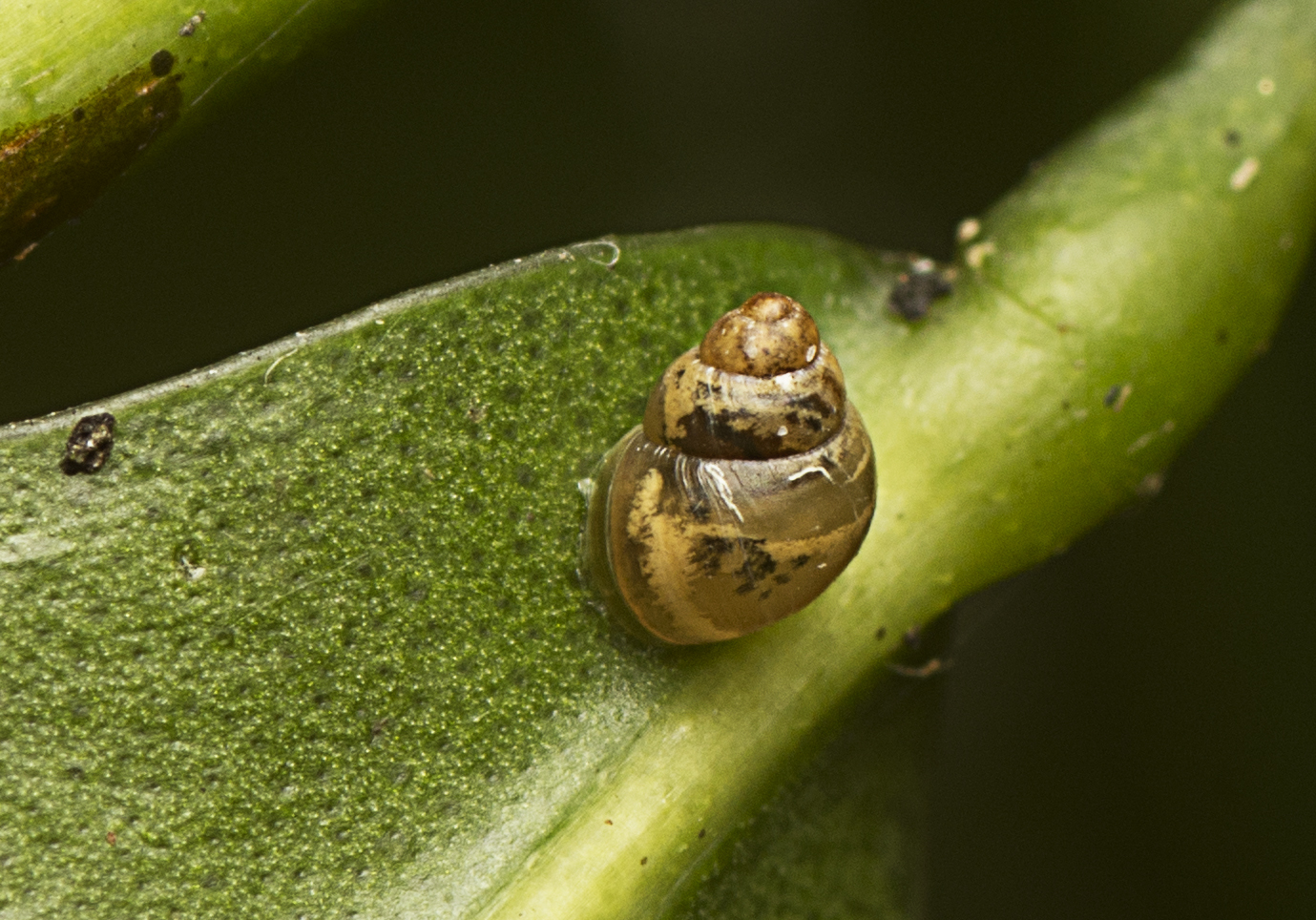
- Tornatellinops mastersi

Scientific classification
- Kingdom: Animalia
- Phylum: Mollusca
- Class: Gastropoda
- Order: Stylommatophora
- Family: Achatinellidae
- Genus: Tornatellinops; Pilsbry, 1915

Species
- See text

= Tornatellinops =

Genus of gastropods

Tornatellinops is a genus of minute air-breathing land snails, terrestrial gastropod mollusc, or micromolluscs in the family Achatinellidae.

== Distribution ==
This genus is endemic to islands of the South Pacific.

== Species ==
Species within the genus Tornatellinops include:

- Tornatellinops inconspicua (Brazier, 1872)
- Tornatellinops iredalei (Pilsbry & Cooke, 1915)
- Tornatellinops jacksonensis (Cox, 1864)
- Tornatellinops lidgbirdensis (Iredale, 1944)
- Tornatellinops mastersi (Brazier, 1876)
- Tornatellinops moluccana Boettger, 1891
- Tornatellinops moohuensis (Preston, 1913)
- Tornatellinops nepeanensis (Preston, 1913)
- Tornatellinops norfolkensis (Preston, 1913)
- Tornatellina novoseelandica (Küster, 1852)
- Tornatellinops ponapensis
- Tornatellinops pressus Iredale, 1940
