= Tornatellinops ponapensis =

Conservation status
- Data Deficient (IUCN 2.3)

Scientific classification
- Kingdom: Animalia
- Phylum: Mollusca
- Class: Gastropoda
- Order: Stylommatophora
- Family: Achatinellidae
- Genus: Tornatellinops
- Species: T. ponapensis

Binomial name
- Tornatellinops ponapensis (Pilsbry & C. M. Cooke, 1915)

Species of gastropod

Tornatellinops ponapensis is a species of small air-breathing land snail, a terrestrial pulmonate gastropod mollusc or micromollusc in the family Achatinellidae. This species is endemic to Micronesia.
