= Tornatellinops lidgbirdensis =

Scientific classification
- Kingdom: Animalia
- Phylum: Mollusca
- Class: Gastropoda
- Order: Stylommatophora
- Family: Achatinellidae
- Genus: Tornatellinops
- Species: T. lidgbirdensis

Binomial name
- Tornatellinops lidgbirdensis (Iredale, 1944)
- Location of Lord Howe Island

Synonyms
- Tornelasmias lidgbirdense Iredale, 1944

Species of land snail

Tornatellinops lidgbirdensis, also known as the Mount Lidgbird miniature treesnail, is a species of tree snail that is endemic to Australia's Lord Howe Island in the Tasman Sea.

== Description ==
The elongately conical shell of adult snails is 3.7–4 mm in height, with a diameter of 1.6–1.8 mm, with a high spire, impressed sutures and rounded whorls. It is black and glossy with distinct growth lines. The umbilicus is imperforate. The aperture is subovate. The animal is black.

== Habitat ==
The snail occurs only at the southern end of the island, inhabiting rock faces on the summit of Mount Lidgbird and the slopes of Mount Gower.
