= List of non-marine molluscs of Uganda =

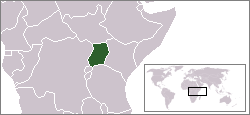
Location of Uganda

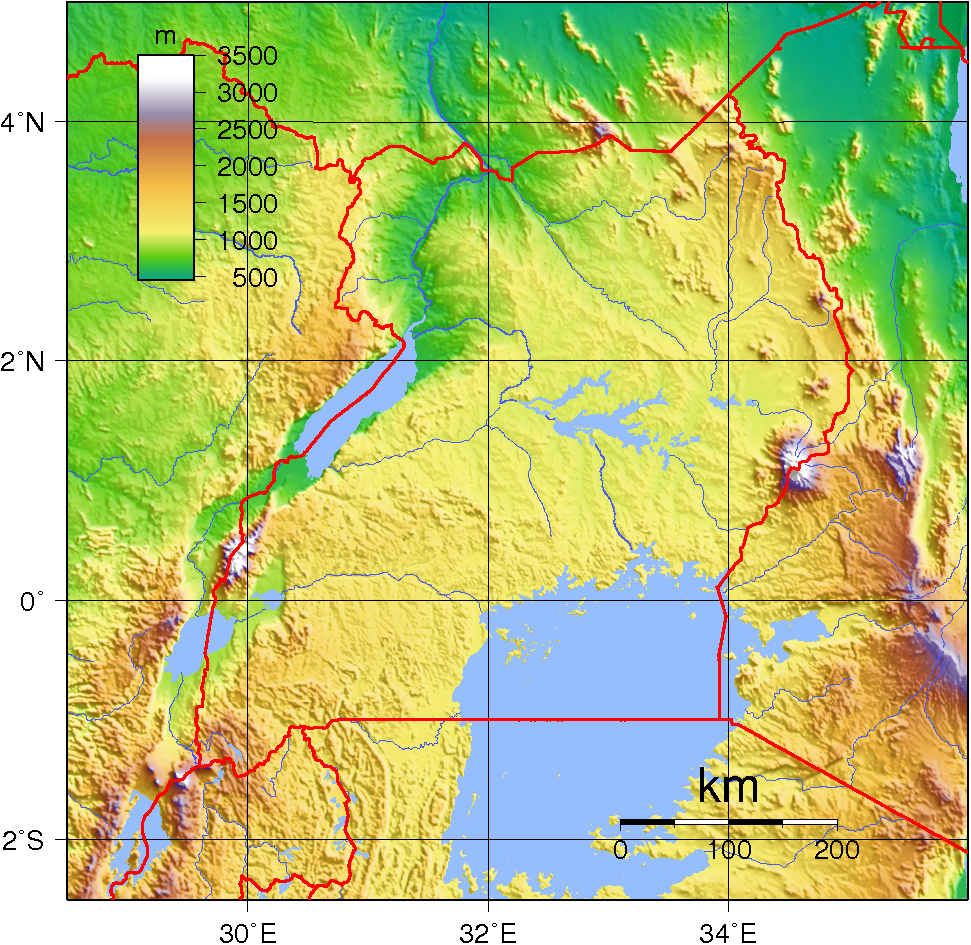
topography of Uganda

The non-marine molluscs of Uganda are the molluscan fauna of Uganda (wildlife of Uganda). Since Uganda is a land-locked country, there are no marine species present. A number of species of freshwater and land molluscs are found in the wild in Uganda.

66 native molluscs of Uganda were listed in 2010 IUCN Red List of Threatened Species.

There are 297 species of land snails in Uganda.

== Freshwater gastropods ==
Planorbidae

- Africanogyrus coretus (de Blainville, 1826)
- Bulinus mutandensis Preston, 1913 - endemic

Lymnaeidae

- Radix natalensis (Krauss, 1848)

== Land gastropods ==
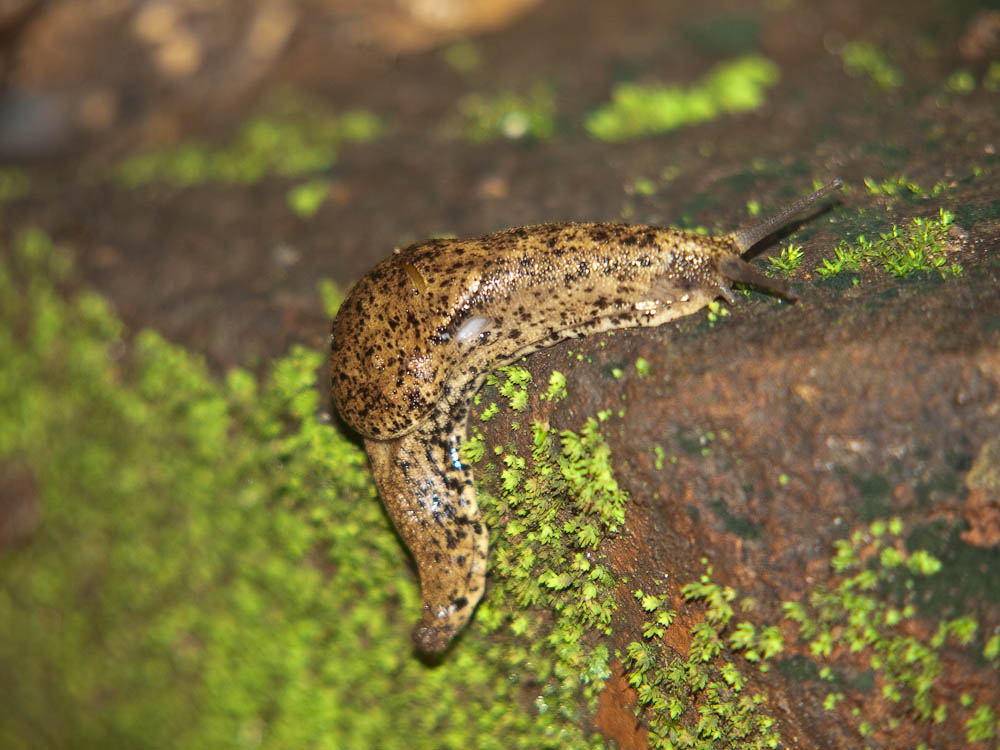
Unidentified land gastropod from Uganda

Land gastropods in Uganda include (there is listed 168 species according to Wronski & Hausdorf B. (2010) and some additional records in this list meantime):

Cyclophoridae

- Elgonocyclus koptaweliensis (Germain, 1934)

Maizaniidae

- Maizania elatior (Martens, 1892)
- Maizania volkensi (Martens, 1895)

Veronicellidae

- Laevicaulis striatus (Simroth, 1896)
- Laevicaulis stuhlmanni (Simroth, 1895)
- Pseudoveronicella liberiana (Gould, 1850)

Succineidae

- Quickia concisa (Morelet, 1849)
- "Succineidae species A"
- "Succineidae species B"

Valloniidae

- Acanthinula straeleni Adam, 1954
- Pupisoma (Ptychopatula) dioscoricola (C. B. Adams, 1845)
- "Pupisoma (Ptychopatula) species A"
- "Pupisoma (Ptychopatula) species B"
- "Pupisoma (Ptychopatula) species C"
- "Pupisoma (Pupisoma) species A"

Truncatellidae

- Negulus ruwenzoriensis Adam, 1957

Vertiginidae

- Nesopupa (Afripupa) bisulcata (Jickeli, 1873)
- Truncatellina ninagongensis (Pilsbry, 1935)
- Truncatellina pygmaeorum (Pilsbry & Cockerell, 1933)
- Truncatellina ruwenzoriensis Adam, 1957

Cerastidae

- Cerastus trapezoideus rapezoideus (Martens, 1892)
- Conulinus rutshuruensis Pilsbry, 1919
- "Conulinus species A"
- Edouardia metula (Martens, 1895)
- "Edouardia species A"
- Rhachidina braunsi (Martens, 1869)

Achatinidae

- Archachatina (Tholachatina) osborni (Pilsbry, 1919)
- Limicolaria elegans Thiele, 1911
- Limicolaria martensiana (E. A. Smith, 1880)
- Limicolaria saturata E. A. Smith, 1895

Ferussaciidae

- Cecilioides (Cecilioides) kalawangaensis Dartevelle & Venmans, 1951
- Cecilioides (Cecilioides) tribulationis (Preston, 1911)
- Cecilioides (Geostilbia) callipeplum (Connolly, 1923)

Micractaeonidae

- Micractaeon koptawelilensis (Germain, 1934)

Subulinidae

- "Bocageia (Liobocageia) species A"
- Curvella babaulti Germain, 1923
- Curvella bathyraphe Pilsbry & Cockerell, 1933
- Curvella conoidea (Martens, 1892)
- Curvella entebbensis Preston, 1912
- Curvella ovata (Putzey, 1899)
- "Curvella species A"
- "Curvella species B"
- Ischnoglessula cruda (Pilsbry, 1919)
- Ischnoglessula echinophora (Verdcourt, 2006)
- Ischnoglessula elegans (Martens, 1895)
- Ischnoglessula famelica (Pilsbry, 1919)
- Ischnoglessula gracillima (Pilsbry, 1919)
- Kempioconcha terrulenta (Morelet, 1883)
- Nothapalus adelus Connolly, 1923
- Nothapalus paucispira (Martens, 1892)
- Nothapalus stuhlmanni (Martens, 1897)
- Nothapalus ugandanus Connolly, 1923
- Opeas toroense Connolly, 1923
- "Opeas species A"
- "Opeas species B"
- "Opeas species C"
- Oreohomorus apio Wronski & Hausdorf, 2009
- Oreohomorus nitidus (Martens, 1897)
- Pseudoglessula intermedia Thiele, 1911
- Pseudopeas burunganum Connolly, 1923
- Pseudopeas curvelliforme Pilsbry, 1919
- Pseudopeas elgonense Connolly, 1923
- Pseudopeas iredalei Connolly, 1923
- "Pseudopeas species A"
- Subulina entebbana Pollonera, 1907
- Subulina subcrenata Martens, 1895
- Subulina viridula Connolly, 1923
- Subuliniscus lucasi Pilsbry, 1919
- "Subuliniscus species A"
- Subulona clara (Pilsbry, 1919)
- Subulona ischna (Pilsbry, 1919)
- Subulona pinguis (Martens, 1895)

Streptaxidae

- Gonaxis latula (Martens, 1895)
- Gonaxis translucida (Dupuis & Putzeys, 1901)
- Gulella (Avakubia) avakubiensis Pilsbry, 1919
- Gulella (Conogulella) conospira (Martens, 1892)
- Gulella (Gulella) laevigata (Dohrn, 1865)
- Gulella (Gulella) mikenoensis (Preston, 1913)
- Gulella (Molarella) malasangiensis (Preston, 1913)
- Gulella (Molarella) ugandensis (E. A. Smith, 1901)
- Gulella (Paucidentina) brevis (Thiele, 1911)
- Gulella (Paucidentina) masisiensis Pilsbry, 1919
- Gulella (Plicigulella) vicina adelpha (Preston, 1913)
- Gulella (Primigulella) linguifera (Martens, 1895)
- Gulella (Pupigulella) pupa (Thiele, 1911)
- Gulella (Silvigulella) osborni Pilsbry, 1919
- Gulella (Tortigulella) cara Pilsbry, 1919
- Gulella (Tortigulella) heteromphala Pilsbry, 1919
- Gulella (Tortigulella) lessensis Pilsbry, 1919
- Gulella (Wilmattina) disseminata (Preston, 1913)
- Gulella decussatula (Preston, 1913)
- Gulella ruwenzoriensis van Bruggen & van Goethem, 1999
- Gulella selene van Bruggen & van Goethem, 1999
- Gulella virungae van Bruggen & van Goethem, 1999
- Pseudogonaxis pusillus (Martens, 1897)
- Ptychotrema (Ennea) bequaerti (Dautzenberg & Germain, 1914)
- Ptychotrema (Ennea) fraterculus Pilsbry, 1919
- Ptychotrema (Ennea) paradoxulum (Martens, 1895)
- Ptychotrema (Ennea) pollonerae Preston, 1913
- Ptychotrema (Ennea) silvaticum Pilsbry, 1919
- Ptychotrema (Haplonepion) geminatum (Martens, 1895)
- Ptychotrema (Haplonepion) runsoranum (Martens, 1892)
- Ptychotrema (Parennea) aequatoriale Pilsbry, 1919
- Ptychotrema (Parennea) cossyphae van Bruggen, 1989
- Ptychotrema (Parennea) goossensi (Adam & van Goethem, 1978)
- Ptychotrema (Parennea) kerereense (Adam & van Goethem, 1978)
- Ptychotrema (Parennea) kigeziense (Preston, 1913)
- Ptychotrema (Parennea) pelengeense (Adam & van Goethem, 1978)
- Streptostele (Graptostele) teres Pilsbry, 1919
- Streptostele (Raffraya) horei E. A. Smith, 1890
- Streptostele (Streptostele) bacillum Pilsbry, 1919
- Streptostele (Streptostele) coloba Pilsbry, 1919
- "Streptostele (Streptostele) species A"
- "Streptostele (Streptostele) species B"
- Varicostele lessensis Pilsbry, 1919

Punctidae

- Paralaoma servilis (Shuttleworth, 1852)
- Punctum pallidum Connolly, 1922
- Punctum ugandanum (E. A. Smith, 1903)

Charopidae

- Afrodonta kempi (Connolly, 1925)
- Prositala butumbiana (Martens, 1895)
- Trachycystis iredalei Preston, 1912
- Trachycystis lamellifera (E. A. Smith, 1903)

family ?

- "Punctoidea species A"

Helicarionidae

- Kaliella barrakporensis (L. Pfeiffer, 1852)
- Kaliella iredalei Preston, 1912

Euconulidae

- Afroconulus iredalei (Preston, 1912)
- "Afroconulus species A"
- "Afroconulus species B"
- Afroguppya rumrutiensis (Preston, 1911)
- Afroguppya solemi de Winter & van Bruggen, 1992
- "Afroguppya species A"
- Afropunctum seminium (Morelet, 1873)

Urocyclidae

- Atoxon pallens Simroth, 1895
- Chlamydarion spatiosus (Preston, 1914)
- Gymnarion aloysiisabaudiae (Pollonera, 1906)
- Thapsia cf. hanningtoni (E. A. Smith, 1890)
- Thapsia cf. inclinans (Preston, 1914)
- Thapsia kigeziensis (Preston, 1913)
- Thapsia rufescens Pilsbry, 1919
- Thapsia rutshuruensis Pilsbry, 1919
- "Thapsia species A"
- Trichotoxon heynemanni Simroth, 1888
- Trochonanina (Trochonanina) lessensis (Pilsbry, 1919)
- Trochozonites (Teleozonites) adansoniae (Morelet, 1848)
- Trochozonites (Trochozonites) bellula (Martens, 1892)
- Trochozonites (Trochozonites) plumaticostata Pilsbry, 1919
- Trochozonites (Trochozonites) trifilaris ituriensis Pilsbry, 1919
- Trochozonites (Zonitotrochus) aillyi Pilsbry, 1919
- Trochozonites (Zonitotrochus) medjensis Pilsbry, 1919
- "Trochozonites (Zonitotrochus) species A"
- "Verrucarion species A"
- "Verrucarion species B"
- "Sheldoniinae species A"
- "Sheldoniinae species B"
- "Sheldoniinae species C"
- "Sheldoniinae species D"
- "Sheldoniinae species E"
- "Sheldoniinae species F"
- "Sheldoniinae species G"
- "Sheldoniinae species H"
- "Sheldoniinae species I"
- "Sheldoniinae species J"

Halolimnohelicidae

- Halolimnohelix cf. bukobae (Martens, 1895)
- Halolimnohelix cf. fonticula (Preston, 1914)
- Halolimnohelix hirsuta Pilsbry, 1919
- Halolimnohelix cf. malasangiensis (Preston, 1914)
- Halolimnohelix cf. soror (Preston, 1914)
- "Halolimnohelix species A"
- "Halolimnohelix species B"

== See also ==
Lists of molluscs of surrounding countries:

- List of non-marine molluscs of Kenya
- List of non-marine molluscs of Sudan, Wildlife of Sudan
- List of non-marine molluscs of the Democratic Republic of the Congo, Wildlife of the Democratic Republic of the Congo
- List of non-marine molluscs of Rwanda, Wildlife of Rwanda
- List of non-marine molluscs of Tanzania
