= List of non-marine molluscs of Kenya =

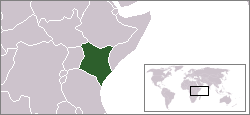
Location of Kenya

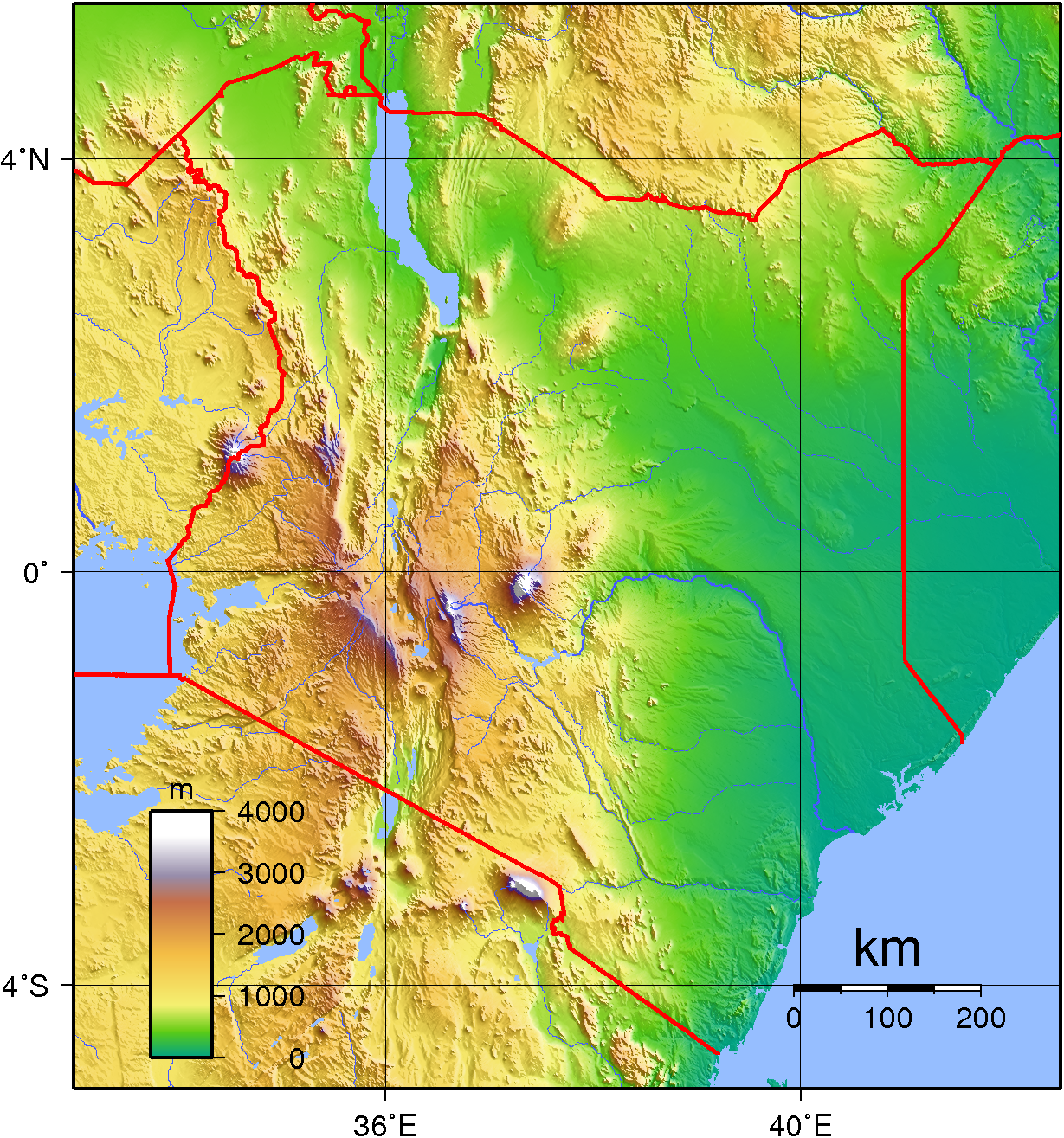
topography of Kenya

The non-marine molluscs of Kenya are a part of the molluscan fauna of Kenya (wildlife of Kenya).

A number of species of non-marine molluscs are found in the wild in Kenya.

There are 514 species of land snails in Kenya.

== Freshwater gastropods ==
Thiaridae

- Melanoides tuberculata (O. F. Müller, 1774)

Lymnaeidae

- Radix natalensis (Krauss, 1848)

== Land gastropods ==
Land gastropods in Kenya include:

Cyclophoridae

- Elgonocyclus koptaweliensis (Germain, 1934)

Maizaniidae

- Maizania elatior (Martens, 1892)
- Maizania volkensi (Martens, 1895)

Veronicellidae

- Laevicaulis stuhlmanni (Simroth, 1895)

Succineidae

- Quickia concisa (Morelet, 1849)

Valloniidae

- Pupisoma (Ptychopatula) dioscoricola (C. B. Adams, 1845)

Vertiginidae

- Nesopupa (Afripupa) bisulcata (Jickeli, 1873)
- Truncatellina ninagongensis (Pilsbry, 1935)
- Truncatellina pygmaeorum (Pilsbry & Cockerell, 1933)

Cerastidae

- Conulinus rutshuruensis Pilsbry, 1919
- Conulinus ugandae – subspecies: Conulinus ugandae costatus Verdcourt, 1985
- Edouardia metula (Martens, 1895)
- Rhachidina braunsi (Martens, 1869)

Achatinidae

- Limicolaria martensiana (E. A. Smith, 1880)
- Limicolaria saturata E. A. Smith, 1895

Ferussaciidae

- Cecilioides (Cecilioides) tribulationis (Preston, 1911)
- Cecilioides (Geostilbia) callipeplum (Connolly, 1923)

Micractaeonidae

- Micractaeon koptawelilensis (Germain, 1934)

Subulinidae

- Curvella babaulti Germain, 1923
- Euonyma curtissima Verdcourt
- Ischnoglessula elegans (Martens, 1895)
- Nothapalus paucispira (Martens, 1892)
- Nothapalus ugandanus Connolly, 1923
- Oreohomorus nitidus (Martens, 1897)
- Pseudopeas curvelliforme Pilsbry, 1919
- Pseudopeas elgonense Connolly, 1923
- Subulina entebbana Pollonera, 1907
- Subulona clara (Pilsbry, 1919)

Streptaxidae

- Gulella (Molarella) ugandensis (E. A. Smith, 1901)
- Gulella (Silvigulella) osborni Pilsbry, 1919
- Gulella (Wilmattina) disseminata (Preston, 1913)
- Stenomarconia Germain, 1934

Punctidae

- Paralaoma servilis (Shuttleworth, 1852)
- Punctum pallidum Connolly, 1922
- Punctum ugandanum (E. A. Smith, 1903)

Charopidae

- Afrodonta kempi (Connolly, 1925)
- Prositala butumbiana (Martens, 1895)
- Trachycystis iredalei Preston, 1912
- Trachycystis lamellifera (E. A. Smith, 1903)

Helicarionidae

- Kaliella barrakporensis (L. Pfeiffer, 1852)
- Kaliella iredalei Preston, 1912

Euconulidae

- Afroconulus iredalei (Preston, 1912)
- Afroguppya rumrutiensis (Preston, 1911)
- Afropunctum seminium (Morelet, 1873)

Urocyclidae

- Atoxon pallens Simroth, 1895
- Chlamydarion quentini Verdcourt, 2004
- Gymnarion aloysiisabaudiae (Pollonera, 1906)
- Trichotoxon heynemanni Simroth, 1888
- Trochozonites (Teleozonites) adansoniae (Morelet, 1848)
- Trochozonites (Zonitotrochus) medjensis Pilsbry, 1919

== Freshwater bivalves ==
Sphaeriidae

- Pisidium artifex Kuiper, 1960

== See also ==
- List of marine molluscs of Kenya

Lists of molluscs of surrounding countries:

- List of non-marine molluscs of Somalia, Wildlife of Somalia
- List of non-marine molluscs of Ethiopia, Wildlife of Ethiopia
- List of non-marine molluscs of Sudan, Wildlife of Sudan
- List of non-marine molluscs of Uganda, Wildlife of Uganda
- List of non-marine molluscs of Tanzania, Wildlife of Tanzania
