= Stenomarconia =

Scientific classification
- Kingdom: Animalia
- Phylum: Mollusca
- Class: Gastropoda
- Order: Stylommatophora
- Family: Streptaxidae
- Genus: Stenomarconia; Germain, 1934

Genus of gastropods

Stenomarconia is a genus of air-breathing land snails, terrestrial pulmonate gastropod mollusks in the family Streptaxidae.

== Distribution ==
The distribution of the genus Stenomarconia includes:

- Tanzania
- Kenya

== Species ==
Species within the genus Stenomarconia include:
