= List of non-marine molluscs of Tanzania =

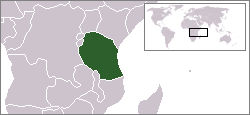
Location of Tanzania

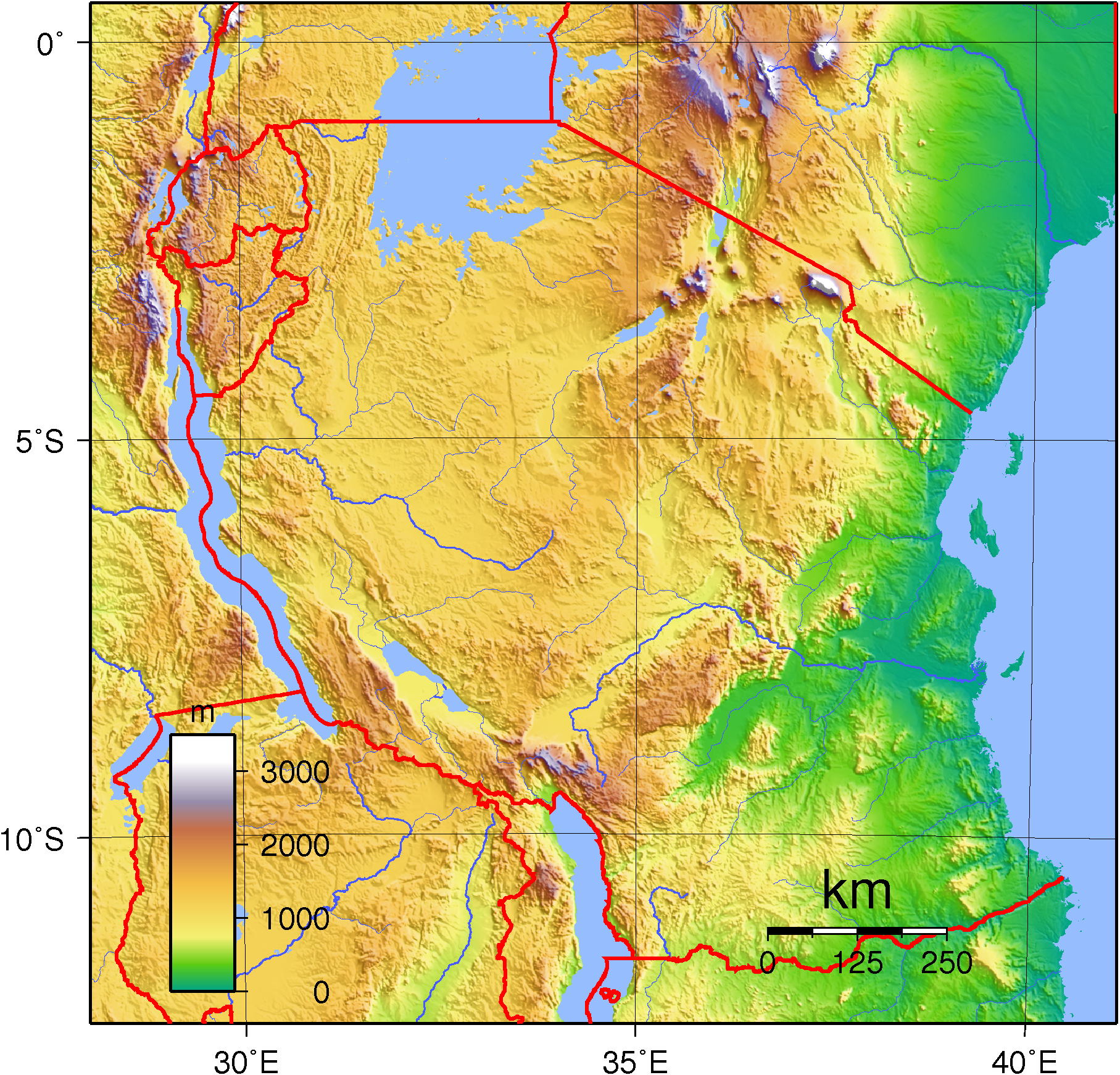
topography of Tanzania

The non-marine molluscs of Tanzania are a part of the molluscan fauna of Tanzania (wildlife of Tanzania).

A number of species of non-marine molluscs are found in the wild in Tanzania.

There are 417 species of land snails in Tanzania.

== Freshwater gastropods ==
Thiaridae

- Melanoides tuberculata (O. F. Müller, 1774)

Lymnaeidae

- Radix natalensis (Krauss, 1848)

== Land gastropods ==
Land gastropods in Tanzania include:

Assimineidae - otherwise marine or salt marsh family, the terrestrial assimineid occur in Tanzania

- "Assiminea" aurifera Preston, 1912 - previously Assimania aurifera

Cyclophoridae

- Cyathopoma azaniense Verdcourt, 1978
- Cyathopoma pembense Rowson, 2010 - endemic to Pemba Island

Pomatiidae

- Tropidophora zanguebarica (Petit, 1850)

Veronicellidae

- Laevicaulis alte (Férussac, 1821)
- Laevicaulis striatus (Simroth, 1896)
- Laevicaulis stuhlmanni (Simroth, 1895)

Maizaniidae

- Maizania elatior (Martens, 1892)
- Maizania volkensi (Martens, 1895)

Succineidae

- Quickia concisa (Morelet, 1849)

Valloniidae

- Pupisoma (Ptychopatula) dioscoricola (C. B. Adams, 1845)

Vertiginidae

- Nesopupa (Afripupa) bisulcata (Jickeli, 1873)
- Nesopupa minutalis (Morelet, 1881)
- Gastrocopta klunzingeri (Jickeli, 1873)

Cerastidae

- Edouardia metula (Martens, 1895)
- Gittenedouardia conulina (von Martens, 1869)
- Rachis punctata (Anton, 1839)
- Rhachidina braunsi (von Martens, 1869)

Achatinidae

- Achatina (Lissachatina) allisa Reeve, 1849
- Achatina (Lissachatina) fulica hamillei Petit, 1859
- Limicolaria martensiana (E. A. Smith, 1880)

Ferussaciidae

- Cecilioides callipeplum (Connolly, 1923)
- Cecilioides (Cecilioides) tribulationis (Preston, 1911)

Micractaeonidae

- Micractaeon koptawelilensis (Germain, 1934)

Subulinidae

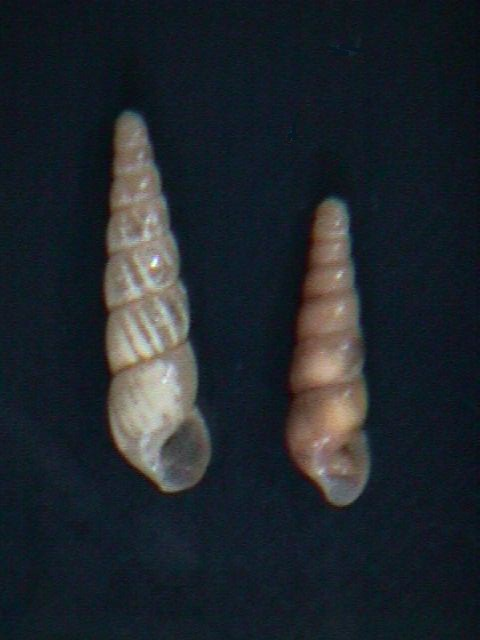
Subulina octona

- Allopeas gracile (Hutton, 1834)
- Curvella subvirescens (E. A. Smith, 1890)
- Kempioconcha terrulenta (Morelet, 1883)
- Opeas delicatum Taylor, 1877
- Opeas lamoense Melvill & Ponsonby, 1892
- Pseudoglessula (Kempioconcha) subolivacea agg. (E. A. Smith, 1890)
- Pseudopeas elgonense Connolly, 1923
- Pseudopeas igembiense Connolly, 1923
- Striosubulina striatella (Rang, 1831)
- Subulina intermedia Taylor, 1877
- Subulina octona (Bruguière, 1789)
- Subulina usambarica K. Pfeiffer - endemic
- Subulona ischna (Pilsbry, 1919)
- Subulona ordinaria Preston, 1910
- Subulona pinguis (Martens, 1895)

Streptaxidae

- Edentulina obesa (Taylor, 1877)
- Edentulina usambarensis Bequaert & Clench - endemic
- Gonaxis (Gonaxis) denticulatus (Dohrn, 1878)
- Gonaxis usambarensis Verdcourt - endemic
- Gonaxis vosseleri Thiele - endemic
- "Gulella" (Aenigmigulella) aenigmatica (E. A. Smith, 1890)
- Gulella baccata (Preston, 1913)
- Gulella gwendolinae (Preston, 1910)
- Gulella (Gulella) laevigata (Dohrn, 1865)
- Gulella jod (Preston, 1910)
- "Gulella" peakei van Bruggen, 1975
- Gulella planidens (von Martens, 1892)
- Gulella (Pupigulella) pupa (Thiele, 1911)
- "Gulella" radius (Preston, 1910)
- Gulella sexdentata (von Martens, 1869)
- Gulella streptostelopsis van Bruggen, 2007
- Ptychotrema (Ennea) pollonerae Preston, 1913
- Streptostele (Raffraya) acicula (Morelet, 1877)
- Streptostele (Raffraya) horei E. A. Smith, 1890
- Tayloria amaniensis Verdcourt - endemic
- Tayloria angustistriata K. Pfeiffer - endemic
- Tayloria hyalinoides Thiele - endemic
- Tayloria shimbiensis Connolly, 1923

Punctidae

- Paralaoma servilis (Shuttleworth, 1852)
- Punctum ugandanum (E. A. Smith, 1903)

Charopidae

- Trachycystis lamellifera (E. A. Smith, 1903)

Euconulidae

- Afroconulus iredalei (Preston, 1912)
- Afroguppya quadrisculpta (Connolly, 1939)
- Afroguppya rumrutiensis (Preston, 1911)
- Afropunctum seminium (Morelet, 1873)
- Microcystina minima (H. Adams, 1867)

Helicarionidae

- Kaliella barrakporensis (L. Pfeiffer, 1852)
- Sitala jenynsi (L. Pfeiffer, 1845)
- Sitala mazumbaiensis Verdcourt

Urocyclidae

- Atoxon pallens Simroth, 1895
- "Dendrolimax" vangoethemi Rowson, 2010
- Elisolimax roebucki (Simroth, 1910)
- Elisolimax rufescens Simroth - endemic
- Leptichnus bernardi van Goethem - endemic
- Pembatoxon insulare van Goethem, 1975
- Thapsia curvatula von Martens, 1897
- Thapsia cf. hanningtoni (E. A. Smith, 1890)
- Thapsia insulsa Preston, 1910
- Trichotoxon heynemanni Simroth, 1888
- Trochonanina mozambicensis (L. Pfeiffer, 1855)
- Trochozonites usambarensis Verdcourt - endemic

Halolimnohelicidae

- Halolimnohelix cf. bukobae (Martens, 1895)
- Halolimnohelix conradti von Martens - endemic

== See also ==
Lists of molluscs of surrounding countries:

- List of non-marine molluscs of Kenya, Wildlife of Kenya
- List of non-marine molluscs of Uganda, Wildlife of Uganda
- List of non-marine molluscs of Rwanda, Wildlife of Rwanda
- List of non-marine molluscs of Burundi, Wildlife of Burundi
- List of non-marine molluscs of the Democratic Republic of the Congo, Wildlife of the Democratic Republic of the Congo
- List of non-marine molluscs of Zambia, Wildlife of Zambia
- List of non-marine molluscs of Malawi, Wildlife of Malawi
- List of non-marine molluscs of Mozambique, Wildlife of Mozambique

oversea countries:

- List of non-marine molluscs of the Seychelles
- List of non-marine molluscs of Madagascar
- List of non-marine molluscs of Mayotte
