= Micractaeon =

Scientific classification
- Kingdom: Animalia
- Phylum: Mollusca
- Class: Gastropoda
- Order: Stylommatophora
- Family: Micractaeonidae; Schileyko, 1999
- Genus: Micractaeon; Verdcourt, 1993
- Species: M. koptawelilensis

Binomial name
- Micractaeon koptawelilensis (Germain, 1934)

Synonyms
- Microglessula Adam; Pseudopeas koptawelilense Germain, 1934; Micractaeon kakamegaensis Verdcourt, 1993

Genus of gastropods

Micractaeon koptawelilensis is a species of land snail, terrestrial gastropod mollusks in the superfamily Achatinoidea (according to the taxonomy of the Gastropoda by Bouchet & Rocroi, 2005).

Micractaeon koptawelilensis is the only species in the genus Micractaeon. Micractaeon is the type genus of the family Micractaeonidae, and Micractaeon is the only genus in the family Micractaeonidae. This family has no subfamilies.

== Distribution ==
The distribution of Micractaeon koptawelilensis includes tropical Africa: Ghana, Cameroon, eastern and southeastern Zaïre, Malawi, eastern Zambia, Uganda, Kenya and Tanzania.

The type locality is Mount Elgon, Kenya.

== Description ==
The width of the shell is 0.7-1.3 mm. The height of the shell is 1.1-2.2 mm.

== Ecology ==
Micractaeon koptawelilensis inhabits forests. These snails are found in leaf litter samples.
