= Edouardia =

Edouardia may refer to:

- Edouardia, a genus of plants in the family Bignoniaceae, synonym of Dolichandra
- Edouardia, a genus of gastropods in the family Cerastidae, synonym of Conulinus
