= Subuliniscus arambourgi =

Conservation status
- Endangered (IUCN 2.3)

Scientific classification
- Kingdom: Animalia
- Phylum: Mollusca
- Class: Gastropoda
- Order: Stylommatophora
- Family: Achatinidae
- Genus: Subuliniscus
- Species: S. arambourgi

Binomial name
- Subuliniscus arambourgi Germain, 1934

Species of gastropod

Subuliniscus arambourgi is a species of small, tropical, air-breathing land snail, a terrestrial pulmonate gastropod mollusk in the family Achatinidae. This species is endemic to Kenya.
