= Tropical and subtropical grasslands, savannas, and shrublands =

Terrestrial habitat type defined by the World Wide Fund for Nature

extent of tropical and subtropical grasslands, savannas, and shrublands

Tropical and subtropical grasslands, savannas, and shrublands is a terrestrial biome defined by the World Wide Fund for Nature. The biome is dominated by grass and/or shrubs located in semi-arid to semi-humid climate regions of subtropical and tropical latitudes. Tropical grasslands are mainly found between 5 degrees and 20 degrees in both North and south of the Equator.

== Description ==
Grasslands are dominated by grasses and other herbaceous plants. Savannas are grasslands with scattered trees. Shrublands are dominated by woody or herbaceous shrubs.

Large expanses of land in the tropics do not receive enough rainfall to support extensive tree cover. The tropical and subtropical grasslands, savannas, and shrublands are characterized by rainfall levels between 90–150 centimetres (35–59 in) per year. Rainfall can be highly seasonal, with the entire year's rainfall sometimes occurring within a couple of weeks.

African savannas occur between forest or woodland regions and grassland regions. Flora includes acacia and baobab trees, grass, and low shrubs. Acacia trees lose their leaves in the dry season to conserve moisture, while the baobab stores water in its trunk for the dry season. Many of these savannas are in Africa.

Large mammals that have evolved to take advantage of the ample forage typify the biodiversity associated with these habitats. These large mammal faunas are richest in African savannas and grasslands. The most intact assemblages currently occur in East African Acacia savannas and Zambezian savannas consisting of mosaics of miombo, mopane, and other habitats. Large-scale migration of tropical savanna herbivores, such as wildebeest (Connochaetes taurinus) and zebra (Equus quagga), are continuing to decline through habitat alteration and hunting. They now only occur to any significant degree in East Africa and the central Zambezian region. Much of the extraordinary abundance of Guinean and Sahelian savannas has been eliminated, although the large-scale migrations of Ugandan Kob still occur in the savannas in the Sudd region. The Sudan type of climate is characterized by an alternating hot and rainy season, and a cool and dry season. In the Northern Hemisphere, the hot rainy season normally begins in May and lasts until September. Rainfall varies from 25 cm to 150 cm and is usually unreliable. The rest of the year is cool and dry. Rainfall decreases as one goes either towards North in Northern Hemisphere or South in the Southern Hemisphere. Drought is very common.

== Occurrence ==
Tropical and subtropical grasslands, savannas, and shrublands occur on all continents but Antarctica. They are widespread in Africa, and are also found all throughout South Asia and Southeast Asia, the northern parts of South America and Australia, and the southern United States.

== See also ==
- Tropical vegetation
