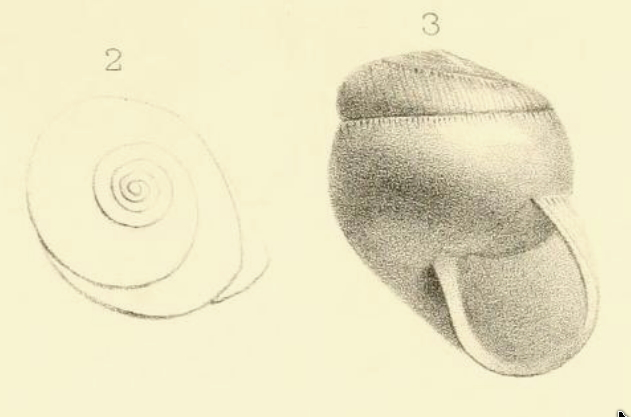
- Shell of Afristreptaxis bloyeti (holotype)

Scientific classification
- Kingdom: Animalia
- Phylum: Mollusca
- Class: Gastropoda
- Order: Stylommatophora
- Family: Streptaxidae
- Genus: Afristreptaxis
- Species: A. bloyeti

Binomial name
- Afristreptaxis bloyeti (Bourguignat, 1890)

Synonyms
- Gonaxis bloyeti Bourguignat, 1890 (original combination)

= Afristreptaxis bloyeti =

Species of gastropod

Afristreptaxis bloyeti is a species of air-breathing land snail, a terrestrial pulmonate gastropod mollusk in the family Streptaxidae.

== Description ==
The height of the shell attains 17 mm, its diameter 15.5 mm.

(Original description in Latin) The shell is narrowly perforated and streptaxiform, with a ventrally turgid, short, and obese shape that is almost equally high as it is wide. The shell is thin, translucent, shiny, and milky, with the body whorl polished and the others folded (except for the embryonic whorls). The folds are stronger and more erect, and on the body whorl, they extend to the aperture, creating a pattern resembling superimposed pleats.

Sculpture: The shell spirals obliquely from left to right, with an obtuse, compressed shape above, barely convex, appearing slightly oppressed.

Whorls: There are six very irregular whorls. The superior whorls are slightly short of breath; the median whorls are irregular, higher on the left than on the right; and the body whorl is relatively large, deflected diagonally from left to right. The suture is well separated.

Base: The base is wide and obliquely deflected, with a flattened area over the columella region and an angular perforation.

Aperture: The aperture is set backward, lunate, and obliquely semi-rounded.

Peristome: The peristome is thickened, with a strong reflection, well-defined and less obvious externally, and almost straight at the insertion point. The palatal callus is inconspicuous.

This species is distinguished from Tayloria craveni (E. A. Smith, 1880) by its smaller size, by its completely crushed spiral, to the point that the upper whorls, more cramped and tighter, are barely visible from the front; by its more irregular spiral growth; by his body whorl more developed in height, and by its aperture less oblique on the right side and therefore with a different shape.

== Distribution ==
This species is endemic to Tanzania.
