= Tayloria (gastropod) =

Scientific classification
- Kingdom: Animalia
- Phylum: Mollusca
- Class: Gastropoda
- Order: Stylommatophora
- Family: Streptaxidae
- Genus: Tayloria; Bourguignat, 1889

Synonyms
- Colpanostoma Bourguignat, 1890 (junior synonym); Gibbonsia Bourguignat, 1890 junior homonym (not Cooper, 1864); Gigantaxis Tomlin, 1930; Gonaxis (Macrogonaxis) Thiele, 1932 superseded combination; Somalitayloria Verdcourt, 1962; Tayloria (Colpanostoma) Bourguignat, 1890; Tayloria (Macrogonaxis) Thiele, 1932 alternative representation; Tayloria (Somalitayloria) Verdcourt, 1962 alternative representation; Tayloria (Tayloria) Bourguignat, 1890 alternative representation

Genus of gastropods

Tayloria is a genus of air-breathing land snails, terrestrial pulmonate gastropod mollusks in the family Streptaxidae.

== Distribution ==
The distribution of the genus Tayloria includes East Africa:

- East Africa
- Somalia
- the Seychelles
- Tanzania

== Species ==
Species within the genus Tayloria include:

- Tayloria amaniensis Verdcourt - from Tanzania
- Tayloria angustistriata K. Pfeiffer - from Tanzania
- Tayloria babaulti Germain, 1923
- Tayloria craveni (E. A. Smith, 1880)
- Tayloria desiderata (Preston, 1913)
- Tayloria enneoides (E. von Martens, 1878)
- Tayloria gigas (E. A. Smith, 1880)
- Tayloria grandis Thiele, 1933
- Tayloria gwandaensis (Preston, 1912)
- Tayloria helicoides (C. R. Boettger, 1913)
- Tayloria hyalinoides Thiele - from Tanzania
- Tayloria iterata E. von Martens, 1897
- Tayloria jouberti Bourguignat, 1890
- Tayloria jucunda Thiele, 1933
- Tayloria kibweziensis (E. A. Smith, 1894)
- Tayloria leroyi (Bourguignat, 1890)
- Tayloria moncieuxi F. Haas, 1934
- Tayloria quadrilateralis (Preston, 1910)
- Tayloria shimbiensis Connolly, 1922
- Tayloria somaliensis (Connolly, 1931)
- Tayloria striata Verdcourt, 1958
- Tayloria urguessensis (Preston, 1913)
- Tayloria usambarica (Craven, 1880)

Synonyms

- Tayloria marsabitensis (Preston, 1913): synonym of Tayloria urguessensis marsabitensis (Preston, 1913) (status change)
- † Tayloria miocenica Verdcourt, 1963: synonym of Artemonopsis miocenica (Verdcourt, 1963) (superseded combination)
