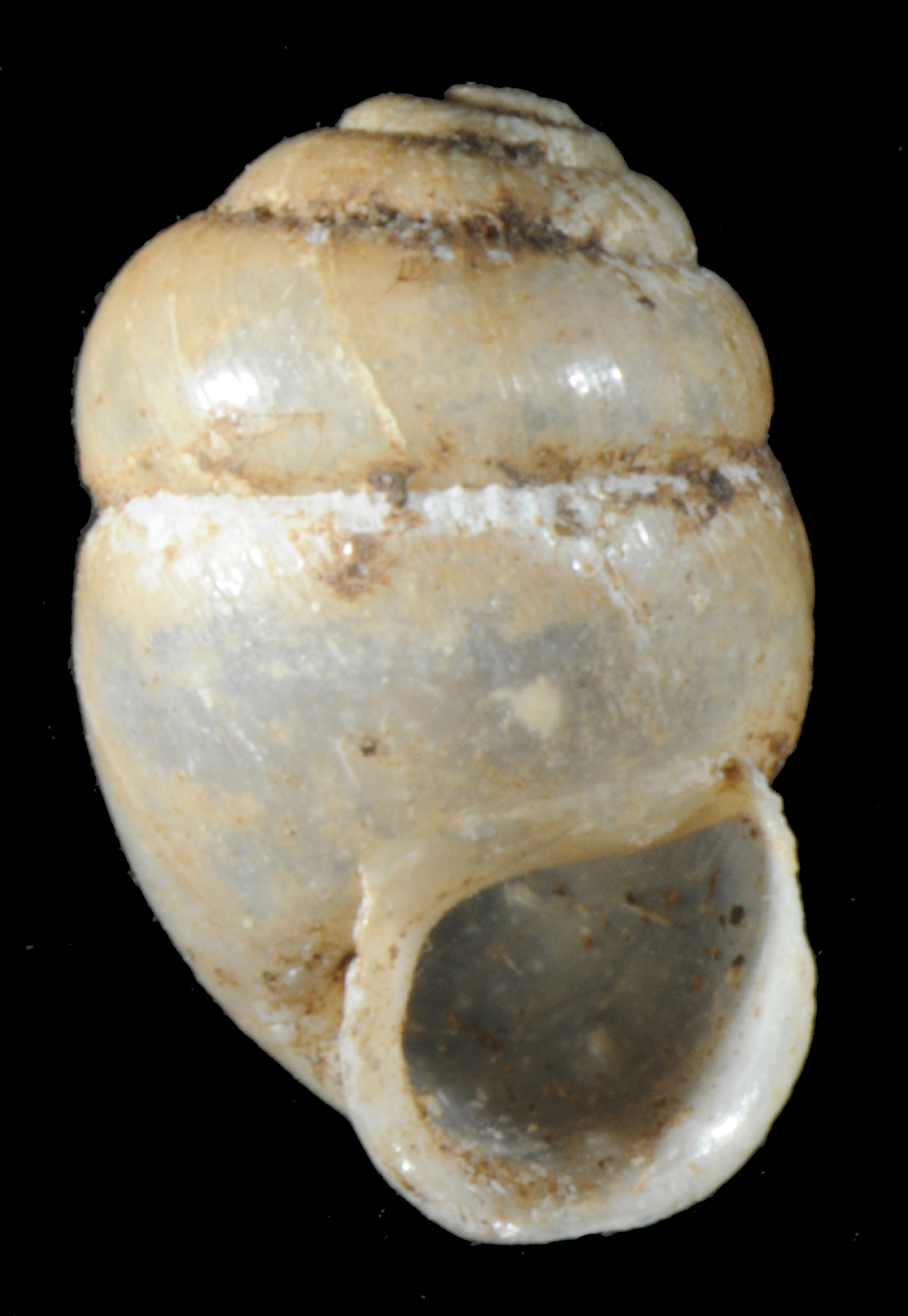
- Shell of Afristreptaxis franzhuberi (holotype in MNHN, Paris)

Scientific classification
- Domain: Eukaryota
- Kingdom: Animalia
- Phylum: Mollusca
- Class: Gastropoda
- Order: Stylommatophora
- Family: Streptaxidae
- Genus: Afristreptaxis
- Species: A. franzhuberi

Binomial name
- Afristreptaxis franzhuberi Thach, 2021

= Afristreptaxis franzhuberi =

Species of gastropod

Afristreptaxis franzhuberi is a species of air-breathing land snail, a terrestrial pulmonate gastropod mollusk in the family Streptaxidae.

== Distribution ==
This species is occurs in Tanzania.
