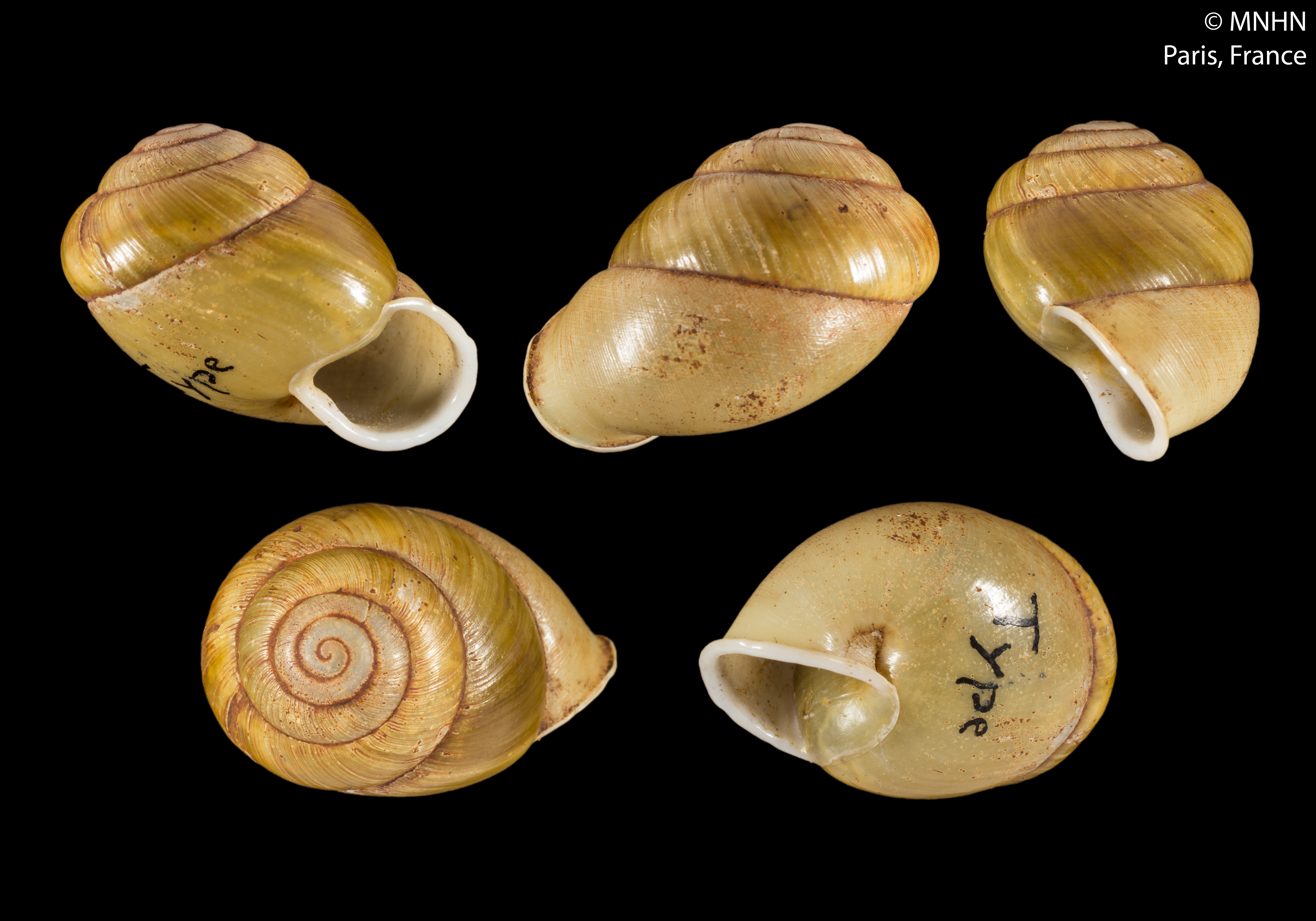
- Shell of Afristreptaxis lamottei (holotype in MNHN, Paris)

Scientific classification
- Domain: Eukaryota
- Kingdom: Animalia
- Phylum: Mollusca
- Class: Gastropoda
- Order: Stylommatophora
- Family: Streptaxidae
- Genus: Afristreptaxis
- Species: A. lamottei

Binomial name
- Afristreptaxis lamottei (E. Binder, 1960)

Synonyms
- Gonaxis (Macrogonaxis) lamottei E. Binder, 1960 (basionym)

= Afristreptaxis lamottei =

Species of gastropod

Afristreptaxis lamottei is a species of air-breathing land snail, a terrestrial pulmonate gastropod mollusk in the family Streptaxidae.

== Description ==
The height of the shell attains 22 mm.

== Distribution ==
This species occurs in Guinea.
