= Trochozonites usambarensis =

Conservation status
- Data Deficient (IUCN 2.3)

Scientific classification
- Kingdom: Animalia
- Phylum: Mollusca
- Class: Gastropoda
- Order: Stylommatophora
- Family: Urocyclidae
- Genus: Trochozonites
- Species: T. usambarensis

Binomial name
- Trochozonites usambarensis Verdcourt

Species of gastropod

Trochozonites usambarensis is a species of air-breathing land snail, a terrestrial pulmonate gastropod mollusks in the family Urocyclidae.

This species is endemic to Tanzania.
