= Afristreptaxis vengoensis =

Scientific classification
- Kingdom: Animalia
- Phylum: Mollusca
- Class: Gastropoda
- Order: Stylommatophora
- Family: Streptaxidae
- Genus: Afristreptaxis
- Species: A. vengoensis

Binomial name
- Afristreptaxis vengoensis (Connolly, 1922)

Synonyms
- Gonaxis (Eustreptaxis) vengoensis Connolly, 1922 superseded combination; Gonaxis vengoensis Connolly, 1922 superseded combination

Species of gastropod

Afristreptaxis vengoensis is a species of air-breathing land snail, a terrestrial pulmonate gastropod mollusk in the family Streptaxidae.

== Description ==
The height of the shell attains 25.2 mm, its diameter 14.6 mm.

(Original description) The shell is comparatively large, oval, and rimate. It is thin, transparent and olivaceous, with a smooth and glossy surface in the front and less so on the back. The spire is produced, with the left side being very convex and the right side nearly straight. The apex is roundly conoid.

There are 6.5 rather flat whorls that increase rapidly in size. The first 1.5 apical whorls are microscopically malleate and faintly spirally striate. The next four whorls are covered with close, prominent, oblique transverse striae with spiral pitting in the interstices. Except immediately below the suture on the back of the shell, the sculpture becomes very faint on the body whorl, which is almost smooth, especially in front. The suture is simple and shallow.

The aperture is quadrate and rounded at the base. The peristome is white, shining, and slightly thickened. The columella is straight, with the margin moderately reflexed over the rim. There is no callus or dentition present.

== Distribution ==
This species is occurs in Mozambique.
