= Afristreptaxis ukamicus =

Scientific classification
- Kingdom: Animalia
- Phylum: Mollusca
- Class: Gastropoda
- Order: Stylommatophora
- Family: Streptaxidae
- Genus: Afristreptaxis
- Species: A. ukamicus

Binomial name
- Afristreptaxis ukamicus (Thiele, 1911)

Synonyms
- Gonaxis ukamicus (Thiele, 1911); Streptaxis ukamica Thiele, 1911 (original combination)

Species of gastropod

Afristreptaxis ukamicus is a species of air-breathing land snail, a terrestrial pulmonate gastropod mollusk in the family Streptaxidae.

== Distribution ==
This species is occurs in Tanzania.
