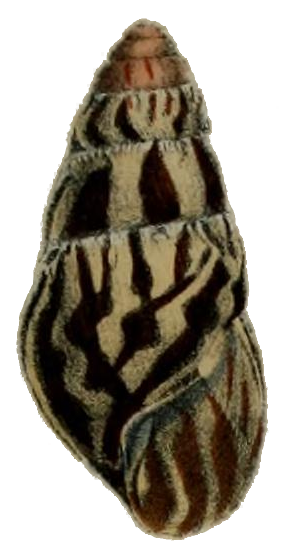
- Drawing of apertural view of a shell of Limicolaria martensiana

Scientific classification
- Domain: Eukaryota
- Kingdom: Animalia
- Phylum: Mollusca
- Class: Gastropoda
- Order: Stylommatophora
- Suborder: Achatinina
- Superfamily: Achatinoidea
- Family: Achatinidae
- Genus: Limicolaria
- Species: L. martensiana

Binomial name
- Limicolaria martensiana (E. A. Smith, 1880)

Synonyms
- Achatina (Limicolaria) martensiana E. A. Smith, 1880

= Limicolaria martensiana =

Species of gastropod

Limicolaria martensiana is a species of tropical air-breathing land snail, a terrestrial pulmonate gastropod mollusk in the family Achatinidae.

The specific name martensiana is in honor of German zoologist Eduard von Martens.

== Distribution ==
This species occurs in Africa, in the following countries:

- Tanzania
- Kenya
- Uganda

== Description ==
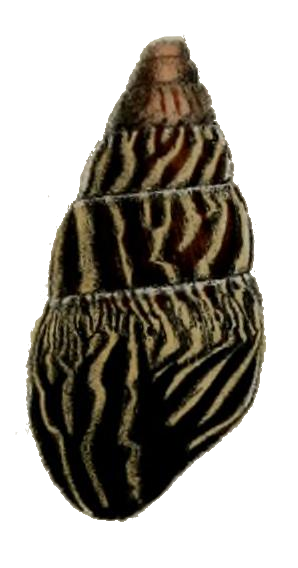
Drawing of abapertural view of a shell of Limicolaria martensiana

This species was originally discovered and described by the British malacologist Edgar Albert Smith in 1880. Smith's original text (the type description) reads as follows:

Shell rimate, rather solid, oblong, turreted, reddish towards the

apex, elsewhere dark purple-red or almost black, variegated with oblique, more or less zigzag, opaque creamed-coloured stripes, some of which extend from suture to suture, others only a short distance from the top of the whorls. The latter are 7½ in number, scarcely convex or almost flat, and very feebly constricted beneath the suture. The upper ones are finely granosely decussated, the last and the penultimate being smooth and merely marked with the oblique incremental strise. All exhibit a fine plication or puckering beneath the suture, beneath which an impressed line is sometimes observable upon the last and preceding volutions. Aperture bluish within, displaying more or less of the external striping, vertical, equalling about two fifths of the shell's length. Columella suberect, bluish and dark violet, scarcely forming any angulation at the base with the lower margin of the peritreme. Length 36 millims., diam. 17; aperture 14½ long, 8 wide.

This handsome shell approximates very closely to A. heuglini of Martens in form, but has certain differences in colour and sculpture, which, however, may prove to be only varietal. A. heuglini, from South Abyssinia and the Gazelle River, is said to be regularly striated, and of a horny lutescent colour flamed with red. A. martensiana, on the contrary, is finely granosely decussated upon the spire, and the coloration is very rich and striking. The dark purplish red, which ill some specimens is almost black, predominates; and the opaque, obliquely somewhat zigzag stripes upon the back of the body-whorl in several shells are abruptly terminated in an oblique line which marks a period of growth. Between the larger creamy stripes which reach from suture to suture in the upper whorls, and extend over

the whole extent of the last, there are minor streaks and spots flowing only a short distance beneath the suture.
