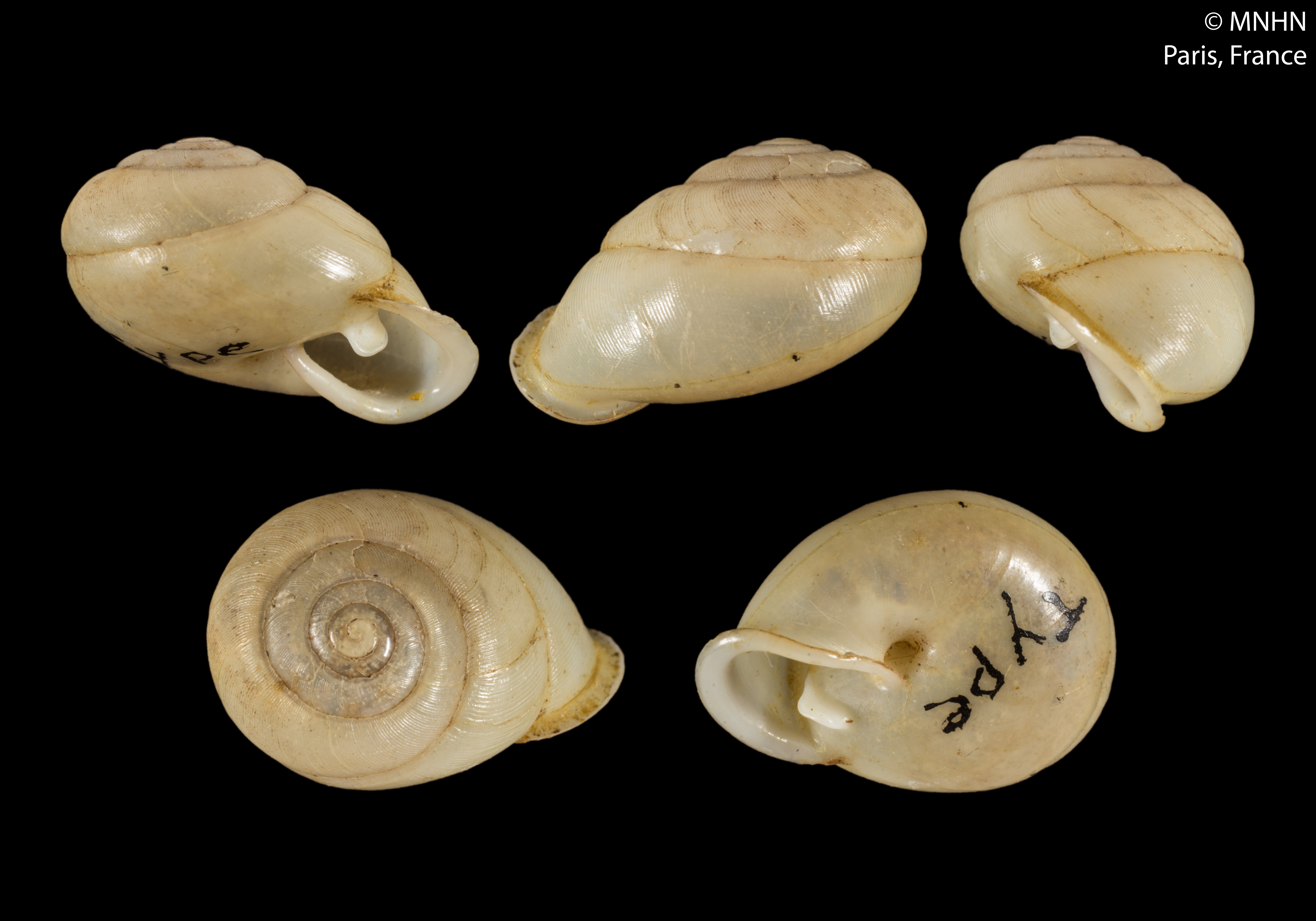
- Shell of Afristreptaxis montisnimbae (holotype at MNHN, Paris)

Scientific classification
- Domain: Eukaryota
- Kingdom: Animalia
- Phylum: Mollusca
- Class: Gastropoda
- Order: Stylommatophora
- Family: Streptaxidae
- Genus: Afristreptaxis
- Species: A. montisnimbae

Binomial name
- Afristreptaxis montisnimbae (E. Binder, 1960)

Synonyms
- Gonaxis (Pseudogonaxis) montisnimbae Bequaert & Clench, 1936 (original combination)

= Afristreptaxis montisnimbae =

Species of gastropod

Afristreptaxis montisnimbae is a species of air-breathing land snail, a terrestrial pulmonate gastropod mollusk in the family Streptaxidae.

== Description ==
The height of the shell attains 13.3 mm (0.52 in).

== Distribution ==
This species is occurs in Guinea.
