= Halolimnohelix conradti =

Conservation status
- Data Deficient (IUCN 2.3)

Scientific classification
- Kingdom: Animalia
- Phylum: Mollusca
- Class: Gastropoda
- Order: Stylommatophora
- Family: Hygromiidae
- Genus: Halolimnohelix
- Species: H. conradti

Binomial name
- Halolimnohelix conradti von Martens

Species of gastropod

Halolimnohelix conradti is a species of air-breathing land snail, terrestrial pulmonate gastropod mollusks in the family Hygromiidae.

This species is endemic to Tanzania.
