= Afristreptaxis ulugurensis =

Scientific classification
- Domain: Eukaryota
- Kingdom: Animalia
- Phylum: Mollusca
- Class: Gastropoda
- Order: Stylommatophora
- Family: Streptaxidae
- Genus: Afristreptaxis
- Species: A. ulugurensis

Binomial name
- Afristreptaxis ulugurensis (Verdcourt, 1965)

Synonyms
- Gonaxis (Macrogonaxis) uluguruensis Verdcourt, 1965 (basionym); Gonaxis ulugurensis Verdcourt, 1965 (original combination); Tayloria (Macrogonaxis) ulugurensis (Verdcourt, 1965) (unaccepted combination )

Species of gastropod

Afristreptaxis ulugurensis is a species of air-breathing land snail, a terrestrial pulmonate gastropod mollusk in the family Streptaxidae.

== Distribution ==
This species is occurs in Tanzania.
