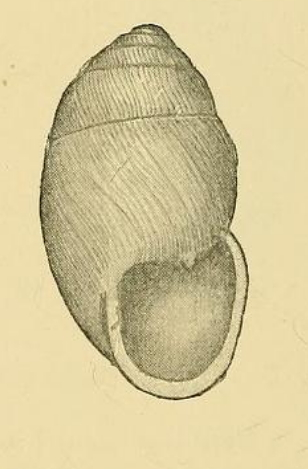
- Shell of Afristreptaxis elongatus (holotype)

Scientific classification
- Kingdom: Animalia
- Phylum: Mollusca
- Class: Gastropoda
- Order: Stylommatophora
- Family: Streptaxidae
- Genus: Afristreptaxis
- Species: A. elongatus

Binomial name
- Afristreptaxis elongatus (Fulton, 1899)
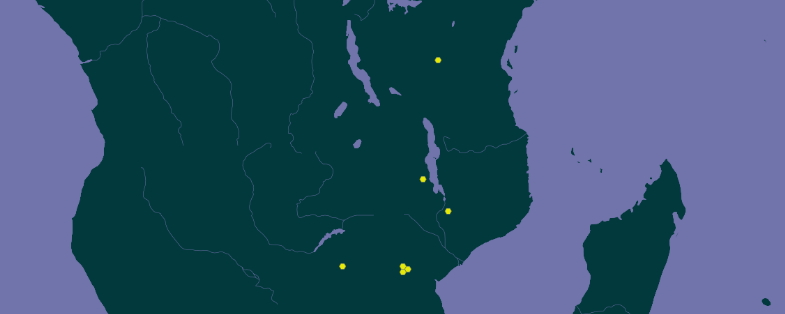

Synonyms
- Eustreptaxis elongatus (Fulton, 1899) superseded combination; Gonaxis (Eustreptaxis) elongatus (Fulton, 1899); Gonaxis elongatus (Fulton, 1899); Streptaxis elongatus Fulton, 1899 (original combination)

= Afristreptaxis elongatus =

Species of gastropod

Afristreptaxis elongatus is a species of air-breathing land snail, a terrestrial pulmonate gastropod mollusk in the family Streptaxidae.

== Description ==
The height of the shell attains 24 mm, its diameter 15 mm.

(Original description) The shell is rimate, oval, and somewhat thin with a whitish, polished surface. The nucleus and the front of the body whorl are almost smooth, while the remainder of the exterior features conspicuous, close-set, oblique striae. There are 6.5 convex whorls. The aperture is semi-ovate and erect, with a slightly expanded, white peristome. The parietal wall has a small tooth or callosity.

== Distribution ==
This species is occurs in Zimbabwe, Malawi and Mozambique.
