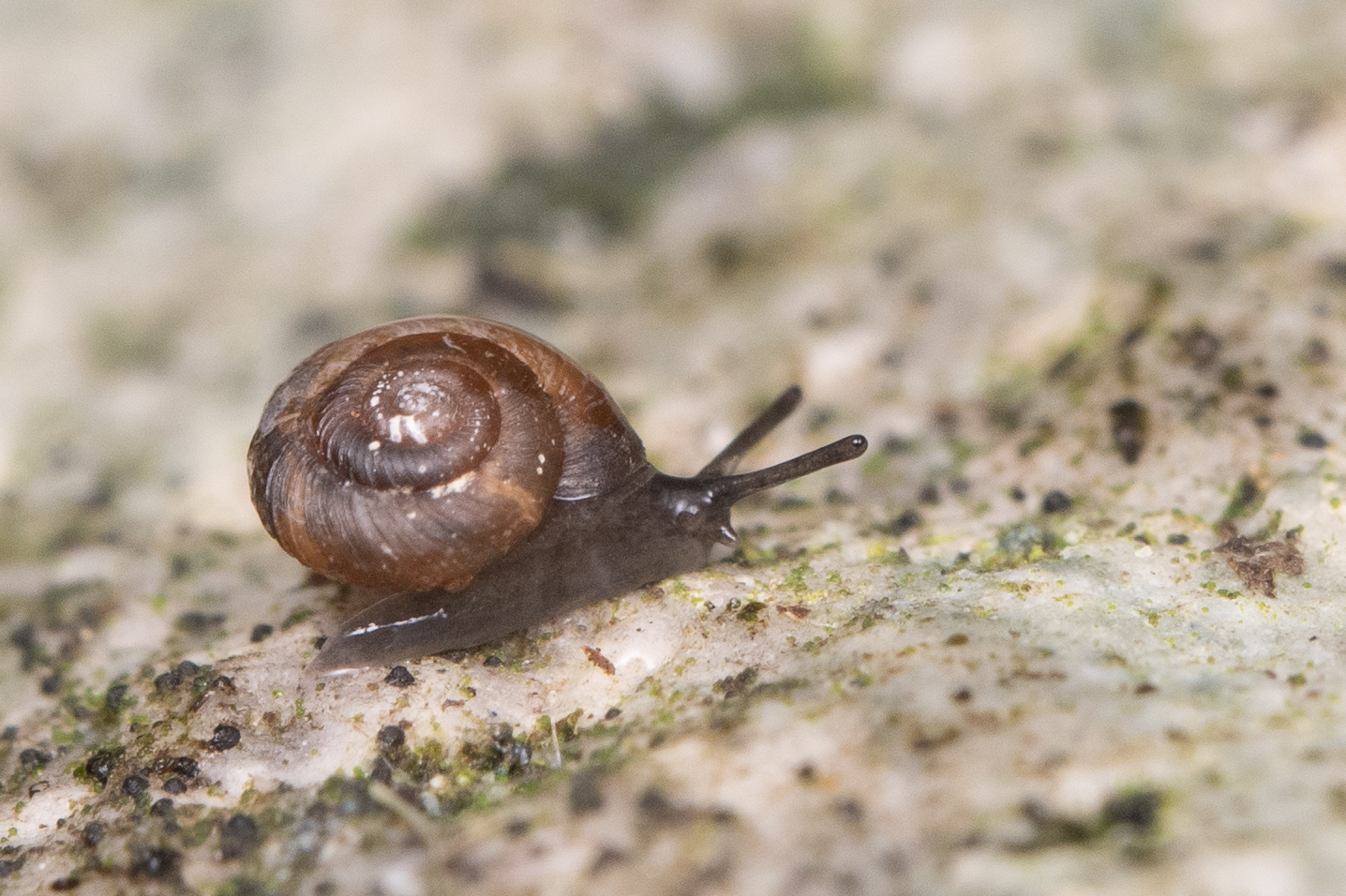
- Live P. servilis in Washington State, United States

Conservation status
- Secure (NatureServe)

Scientific classification
- Kingdom: Animalia
- Phylum: Mollusca
- Class: Gastropoda
- Order: Stylommatophora
- Family: Punctidae
- Genus: Paralaoma
- Species: P. servilis

Binomial name
- Paralaoma servilis (Shuttleworth, 1852)

Synonyms
- Helix (Discus) derelicta Legrand, 1871 (junior synonym); Helix (Helicella) pusilla R. T. Lowe, 1831 (name preoccupied; non Helix pusilla Vallot, 1801); Helix (Patula) cryophila E. von Martens, 1865 (junior synonym); Helix (Patula) stellata Brazier, 1871 (junior synonym); Helix arenicola Tate, 1878 (unavailable: not Helix arenicola Lowe, Lowe, 1854); Helix caputspinulae Reeve, 1852 (junior synonym); Helix discors Petterd, 1902 (junior synonym); Helix epsilon L. Pfeiffer, 1853; Helix hobarti Cox, 1868 (junior synonym); Helix morti Cox, 1864 (junior synonym); Helix mucoides Tenison Woods, 1879 (junior synonym); Helix paradoxa Cox, 1864 (junior synonym); Helix salaziensis G. Nevill, 1870 (junior synonym); Helix servilis Shuttleworth, 1852 (original combination); Helix similis Cox, 1868 (junior synonym); Helix sitiens Legrand, 1871 (junior synonym); Helix tenuicostata L. Pfeiffer, 1846 (junior synonym); Hyalina conspecta Bland, 1865; Microphysa pumila Hutton, 1882; Paralaoma caputspinulae (Reeve, 1852) (junior synonym); Paralaoma decresensis Iredale, 1937 (junior synonym); Paralaoma duncombei Iredale, 1945 (junior synonym); Paralaoma pumila (Hutton, 1882); Paralaoma raoulensis'' Iredale, 1913 (junior synonym); Paralaoma royi Iredale, 1944 (junior synonym); Paralaoma stabilis Iredale, 1937 (junior synonym); Paraloma servilis (Shuttleworth, 1852) (incorrect spelling of generic name); Patula lederi O. Boettger, 1880 (junior synonym); Pleuropunctum micropleuros; Punctum conspectum (Bland, 1865) (junior synonym); Punctum conspectum alleni Pilsbry in Pilsbry & Ferriss, 1919; Punctum conspectum var. pasadenae Pilsbry, 1896 (junior synonym); Punctum cryophilum (E. von Martens, 1865); Punctum lederi (O. Boettger, 1880) (invalid combination); Punctum lederi var. meridionalis O. Boettger, 1905 (junior synonym); Radiodiscus misiollemis Hylton Scott, 1957 (junior synonym); Radiodiscus misionensis Hylton Scott, 1957; Radiodiscus pilsbryi Hylton Scott, 1957; Subfectola caputspinulae (Reeve, 1852) (junior synonym); Tachyphasis (Tachyphasis) salaziensis (Nevill, 1870); Toltecia pusilla (Lowe, 1831); Zonites diegoensis Hemphill in W. G. Binney, 1892

= Paralaoma servilis =

Species of gastropod

Paralaoma servilis is a species of very small air-breathing land snail, a terrestrial pulmonate gastropod mollusk or micromollusk in the family Punctidae, the dot snails.

== Distribution ==
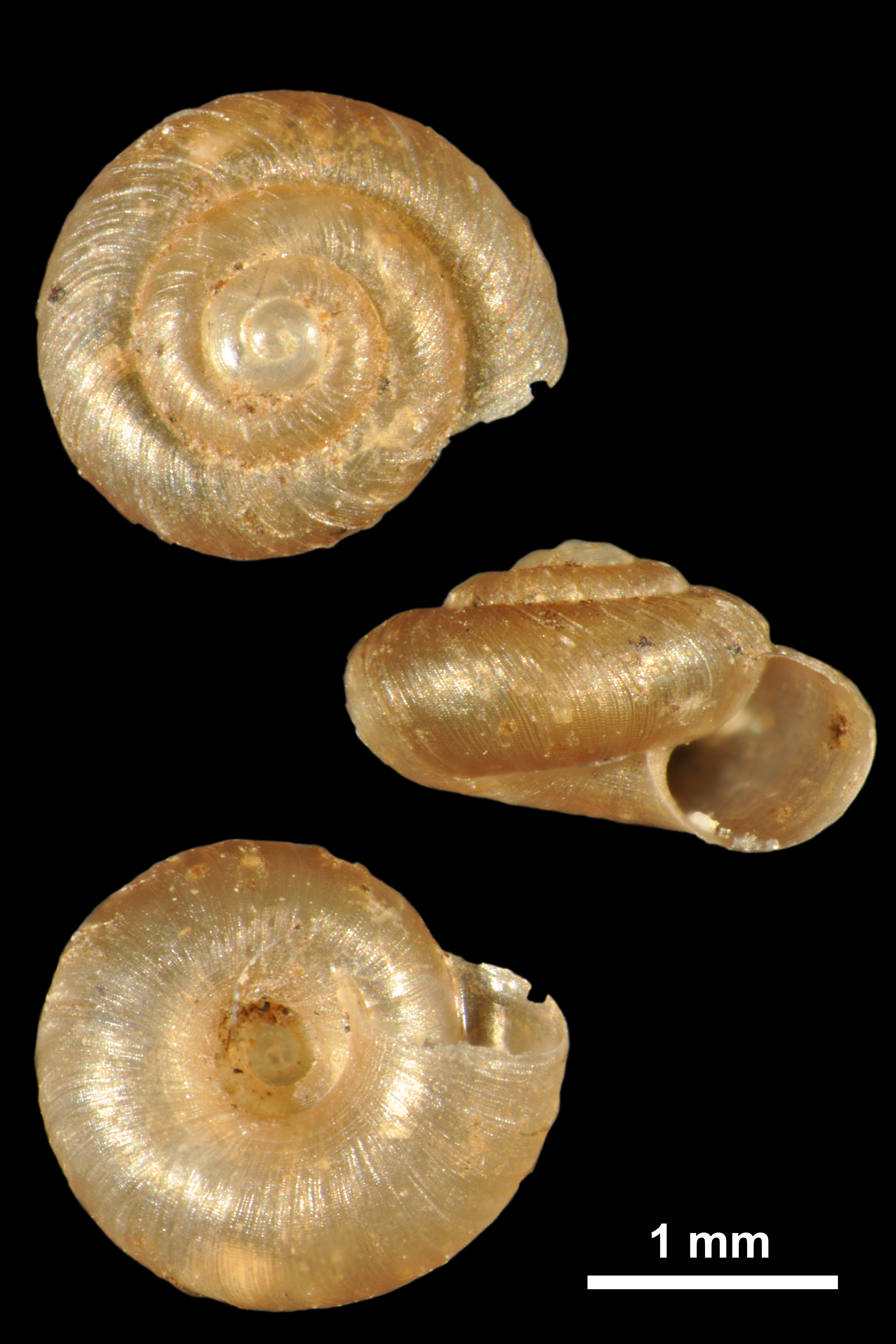
Shell of Paralaoma servilis (specimen at MNHN, Paris)

The native range for this species is thought to be New Zealand. However, the species is known to occur worldwide in numerous countries and islands outside of its native range, including:

- Great Britain
- Uganda
- Kenya
- Tanzania
- Belgium
- France
