= Afristreptaxis loveridgei =

Scientific classification
- Kingdom: Animalia
- Phylum: Mollusca
- Class: Gastropoda
- Order: Stylommatophora
- Family: Streptaxidae
- Genus: Afristreptaxis
- Species: A. loveridgei

Binomial name
- Afristreptaxis loveridgei (Bequaert & Clench, 1936)

Synonyms
- Gonaxis (Macrogonaxis) loveridgei Bequaert & Clench, 1936 (original combination)

Species of gastropod

Afristreptaxis loveridgei is a species of air-breathing land snail, a terrestrial pulmonate gastropod mollusk in the family Streptaxidae.

== Distribution ==
This species occurs in Tanzania.
