= Afristreptaxis vosseleri =

Conservation status
- Data Deficient (IUCN 2.3)

Scientific classification
- Kingdom: Animalia
- Phylum: Mollusca
- Class: Gastropoda
- Order: Stylommatophora
- Family: Streptaxidae
- Genus: Afristreptaxis
- Species: A. vosseleri

Binomial name
- Afristreptaxis vosseleri (Thiele)
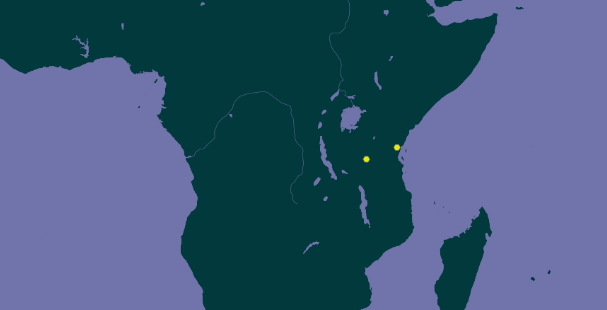

Synonyms
- Gonaxis vosseleri (Thiele, 1911) (superseded combination); Streptaxis vosseleri Thiele, 1911 (original combination)

Species of gastropod

Afristreptaxis vosseleri is a species of air-breathing land snail, a terrestrial pulmonate gastropod mollusk in the family Streptaxidae.

== Distribution ==
This species is endemic to Tanzania.
