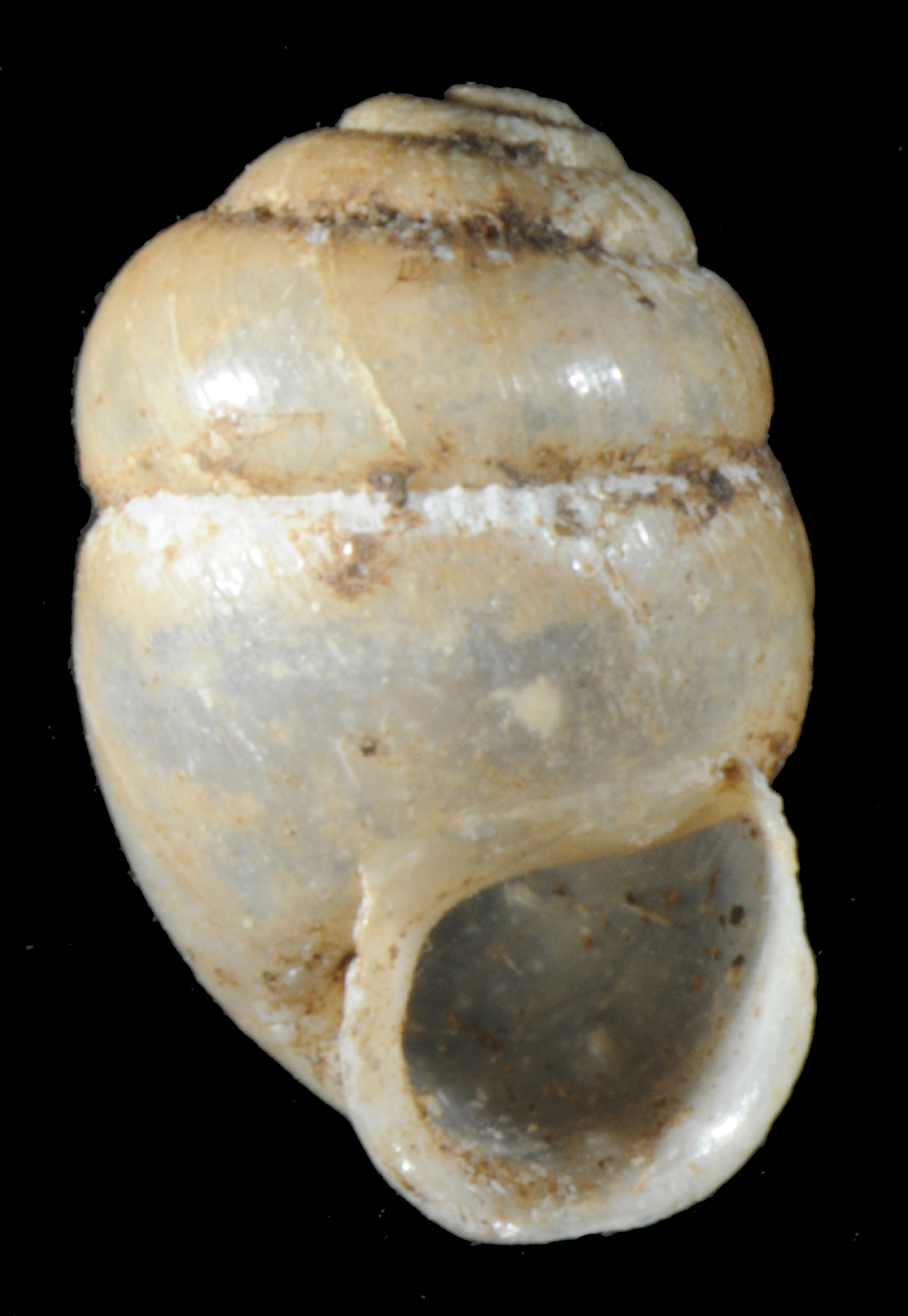
- Shell of Afristreptaxis franzhuberi (holotype at MNHN, Paris)

Scientific classification
- Kingdom: Animalia
- Phylum: Mollusca
- Class: Gastropoda
- Order: Stylommatophora
- Suborder: Achatinina
- Superfamily: Streptaxoidea
- Family: Streptaxidae
- Genus: Afristreptaxis; Thiele, 1932

Type species
- Streptaxis vosseleri Thiele, 1911
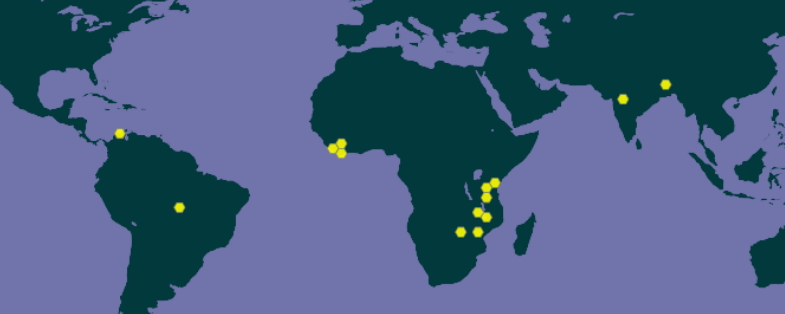

= Afristreptaxis =

Genus of gastropods

Afristreptaxis is a genus of air-breathing land snails, terrestrial pulmonate gastropod mollusks in the subfamily Streptaxinae of the family Streptaxidae.

== Distribution ==
The distribution of the genus Afristreptaxis includes:

- Afrotropical
- South Africa

== Habitat ==
Aristreptaxis is typically found in terrestrial habitats where it thrives in humid and shaded environments. These snails are usually located in leaf litter, under logs, and among moist vegetation, where they contribute to the decomposition process and nutrient cycling.

== Species ==
Species within the genus Afristreptaxis include:

- Afristreptaxis bloyeti (Bourguignat, 1890)
- Afristreptaxis elongatus (Fulton, 1899)
- Afristreptaxis franzhuberi Thach, 2021
- Afristreptaxis lamottei (E. Binder, 1960)
- Afristreptaxis loveridgei (Bequaert & Clench, 1936)
- Afristreptaxis montisnimbae (E. Binder, 1960)
- Afristreptaxis ukamicus (Thiele, 1911)
- Afristreptaxis ulugurensis (Verdcourt, 1965)
- Afristreptaxis vengoensis (Connolly, 1922)
- Afristreptaxis vosseleri (Thiele, 1911)

Synonyms

- Afristreptaxis abessinicus Thiele, 1933: synonym of Gonaxis abessinicus (Thiele, 1933) (original combination)
- Afristreptaxis aethiopicus Thiele, 1933: synonym of Gonaxis aethiopicus (Thiele, 1933) (original combination)
