= Subuliniscus =

Scientific classification
- Kingdom: Animalia
- Phylum: Mollusca
- Class: Gastropoda
- Order: Stylommatophora
- Family: Achatinidae
- Genus: Subuliniscus; Pilsbry, 1919

Genus of land snails

Subuliniscus is a genus of small, tropical, air-breathing land snails, terrestrial pulmonate gastropod mollusks in the family Achatinidae.

== Species ==
The genus Subuliniscus includes the following species:

- Subuliniscus arambourgi Germain
- Subuliniscus lucasi Pilsbry, 1919
- "Subuliniscus species A" from Uganda
