= Tayloria amaniensis =

Conservation status
- Data Deficient (IUCN 2.3)

Scientific classification
- Kingdom: Animalia
- Phylum: Mollusca
- Class: Gastropoda
- Order: Stylommatophora
- Family: Streptaxidae
- Genus: Tayloria
- Species: T. amaniensis

Binomial name
- Tayloria amaniensis Verdcourt

Species of gastropod

Tayloria amaniensis is a species of air-breathing land snail, a terrestrial pulmonate gastropod mollusk in the family Streptaxidae. This species is endemic to Tanzania.
