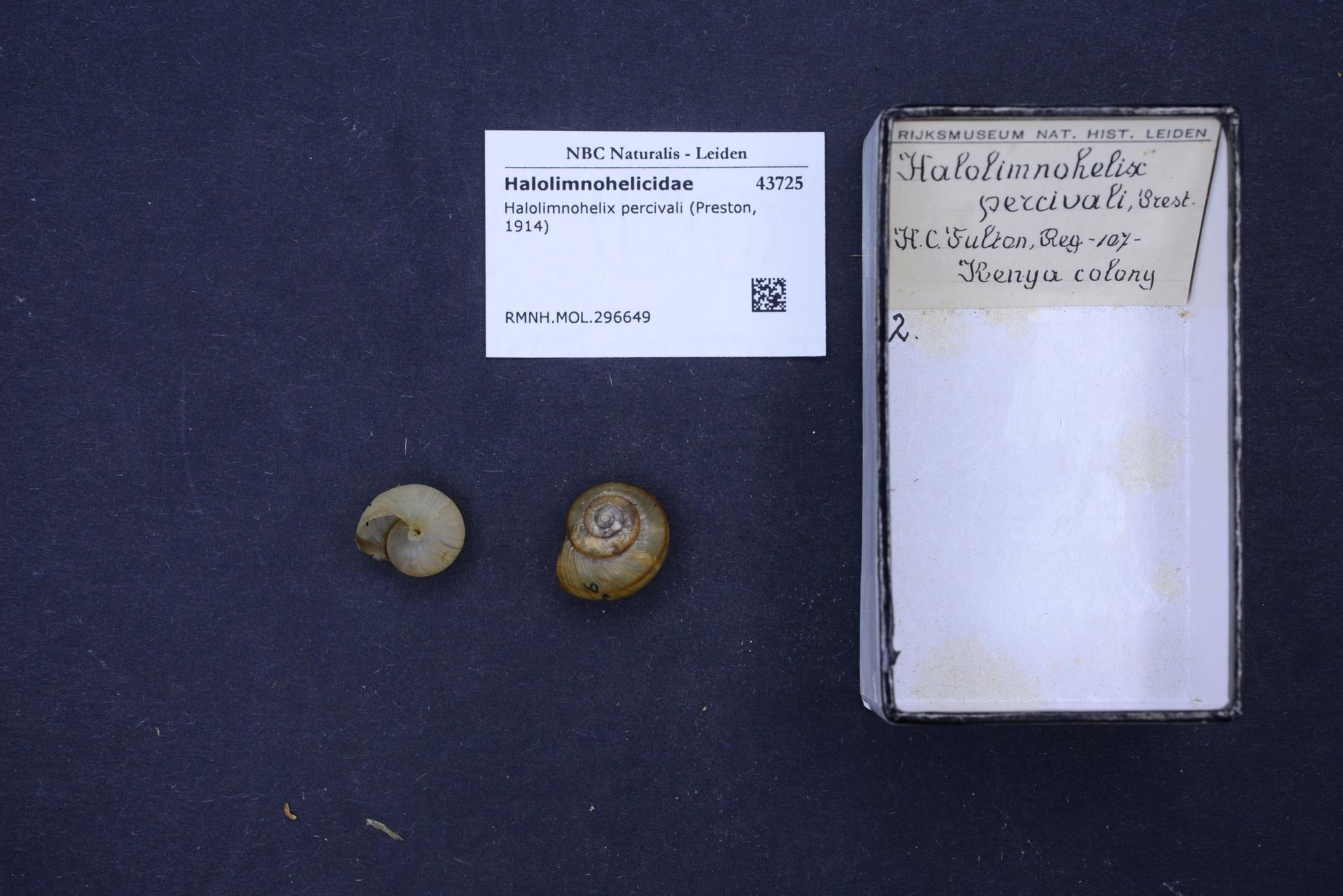
- Halolimnohelix percivali shells

Scientific classification
- Kingdom: Animalia
- Phylum: Mollusca
- Class: Gastropoda
- Order: Stylommatophora
- Family: Hygromiidae
- Genus: Halolimnohelix; Germain, 1913

= Halolimnohelix =

Genus of gastropods

Halolimnohelix is a genus of air-breathing land snails, terrestrial pulmonate gastropod mollusks in the family Hygromiidae.

== Species ==
Species within the genus Halolimnohelix include:

- Halolimnohelix bukobae (von Martens, 1895)
- Halolimnohelix conradti (von Martens, 1895)
- Halolimnohelix percivali (Preston, 1914)
