= Trochozonites =

Scientific classification
- Kingdom: Animalia
- Phylum: Mollusca
- Class: Gastropoda
- Order: Stylommatophora
- Family: Urocyclidae
- Genus: Trochozonites; Pfeffer, 1883

Synonyms
- Helix (Trochozonites) Pfeffer, 1883 (distinct genus); Moaria Chaper, 1885; Trochozonites (Crenatinanina) Germain, 1920· accepted, alternate representation; Trochozonites (Teleozonites) Pilsbry, 1919· accepted, alternate representation; Trochozonites (Trochozonites) Pfeffer, 1883· accepted, alternate representation; Trochozonites (Zonitotrochus) Pilsbry, 1919· accepted, alternate representation

Genus of gastropods

Trochozonites is a genus of air-breathing land snails, terrestrial gastropod mollusks in the family Urocyclidae.

== Species ==
Species within the genus Trochozonites include:

- Trochozonites adansoniae (Morelet, 1848)
- Trochozonites adoxus Connolly, 1925
- Trochozonites aillyi Pilsbry, 1919
- Trochozonites bellula (E. von Martens, 1892)
- Trochozonites buhambaensis Preston, 1914
- Trochozonites crenulata (Germain, 1905)
- Trochozonites dioryx (Melvill & Ponsonby, 1892)
- Trochozonites expatriata Preston, 1914
- Trochozonites kempi Preston, 1914
- Trochozonites leptalea E. A. Smith, 1909
- Trochozonites medjensis Pilsbry, 1919
- Trochozonites percostulata Dupuis & Putzeys, 1901
- Trochozonites plumaticostata Pilsbry, 1919
- Trochozonites prestoni Connolly, 1925
- Trochozonites trifilaris Dupuis & Putzeys, 1901
- Trochozonites usambarensis Verdcourt, 1982

Species brought into synonymy

- † Trochozonites arabica Neubert & Van Damme, 2012 : synonym of † Sagdellina arabica (Neubert & Van Damme, 2012) (new combination)
