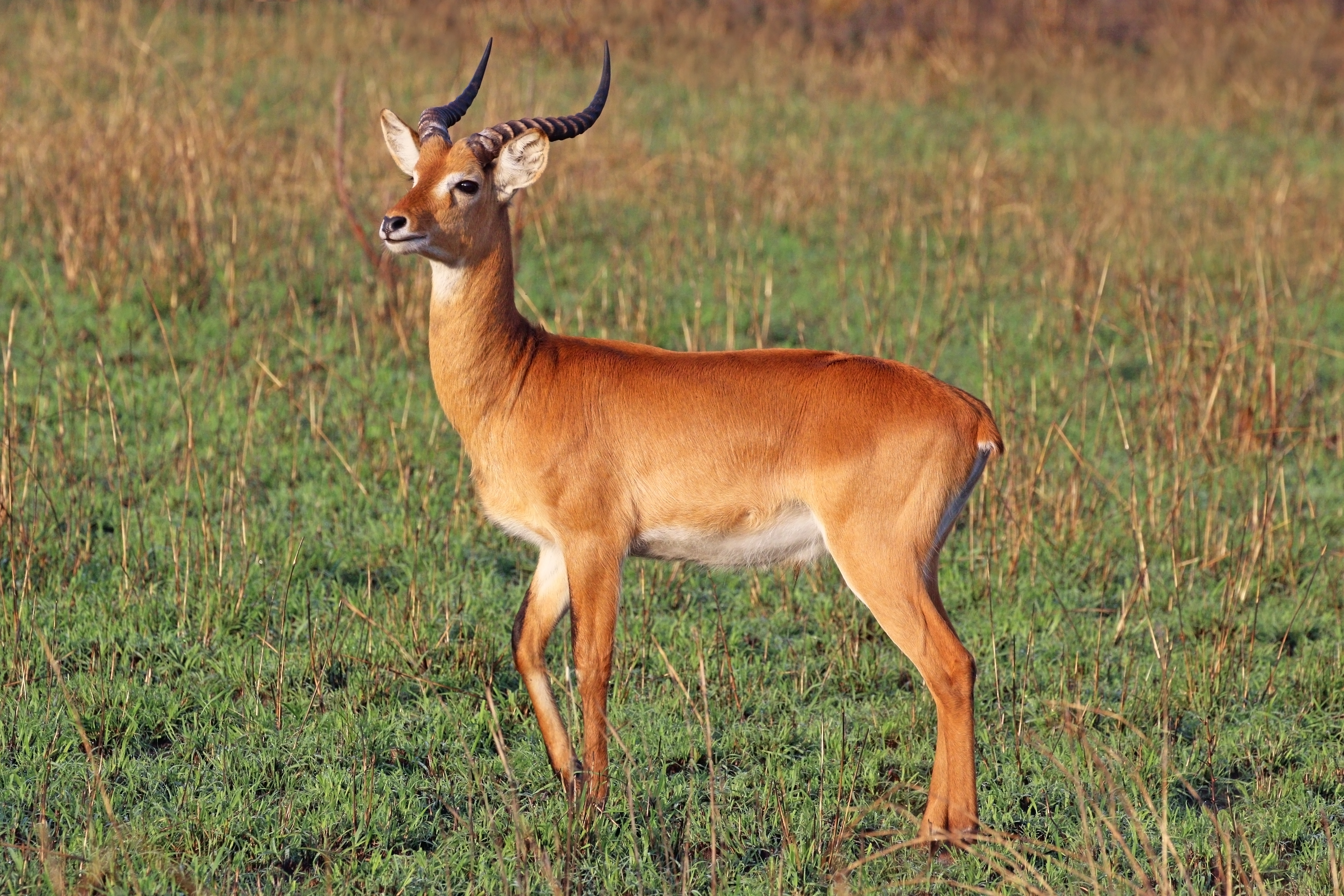
- Male
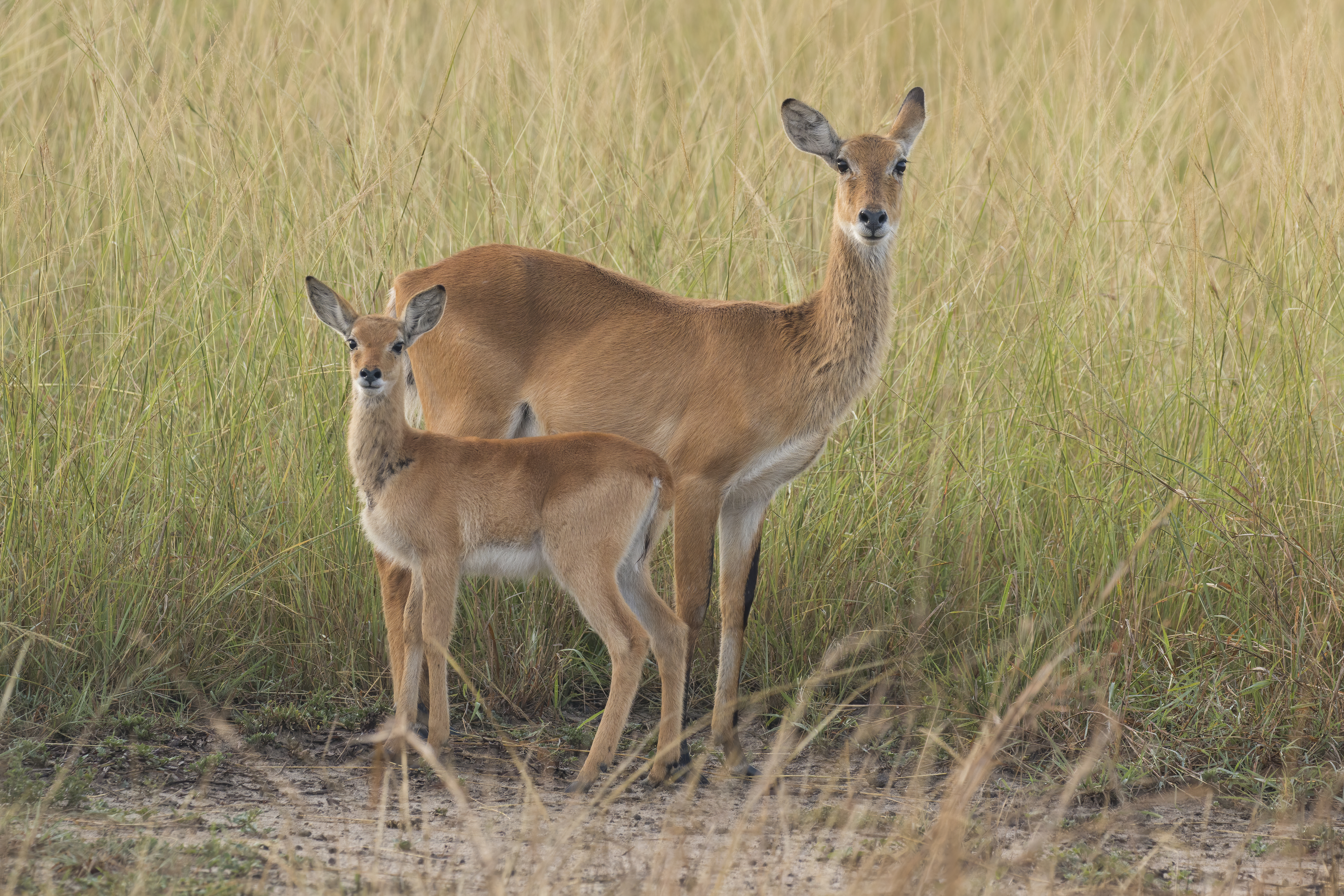
- Female and calf both at Semliki Wildlife Reserve, Uganda

Conservation status
- Least Concern (IUCN 3.1)

Scientific classification
- Kingdom: Animalia
- Phylum: Chordata
- Class: Mammalia
- Order: Artiodactyla
- Family: Bovidae
- Genus: Kobus
- Species: K. kob
- Subspecies: K. k. thomasi

Trinomial name
- Kobus kob thomasi (Sclater, 1864)

= Ugandan kob =

Subspecies of mammal

The Ugandan kob (Kobus kob thomasi) is a subspecies of the kob, a type of antelope. It is found in sub-Saharan Africa in South Sudan, Uganda and the Democratic Republic of the Congo. The Ugandan kob is normally reddish-brown, differentiating it from other kob subspecies.

A Ugandan kob appears on the coat of arms of Uganda, along with a grey crowned crane (Balearica regulorum gibbericeps), representing the abundant wildlife present in the country.

== Description ==
The Ugandan kob is similar in appearance to the impala but it is more sturdily built. Only the males have horns, which are lyre-shaped, strongly ridged and divergent. Males are slightly larger than females, being 90 to 100 cm (3.0 to 3.3 ft) at the shoulder, with an average weight of 94 kg (207 lb), while females are 82 to 92 cm (2.7 to 3.0 ft) at the shoulder and on average weigh about 63 kg (139 lb). Apart from the throat patch, muzzle, eye ring and inner ear, which are white, the coat is golden to reddish-brown, the colour differentiating it from other kob subspecies. The belly and inside of the legs are white, and the front of the forelegs are black.

== Distribution and habitat ==
This subspecies is native to East Africa. It occurs in South Sudan, to the west of the Nile, Uganda and the north-eastern Democratic Republic of Congo. Its range used to extend into northwestern Tanzania, where it grazed the grasslands margining Lake Victoria, and into southwestern Kenya, but it has been extirpated from these countries. It is typically found in open or wooded savanna, within a reasonable distance of water, and it also occurs in grasslands near rivers and lakes. Its habit of lying out in open grassland make it an accessible target for poachers, and 98% of the present population are found in national parks and other protected areas.

== Naming ==
Traditionally, the Ugandan kob is named differently according to tribes and ethnical backgrounds. In Acholi, it's called "Til", the Bugisu people call it "Ishisi," the Baganda people call it "Ensiima", and other tribes have their respective naming. The local name "Til" was derived and used in Uganda's oil industry called the Tilenga project in western Uganda .

== Ecology ==
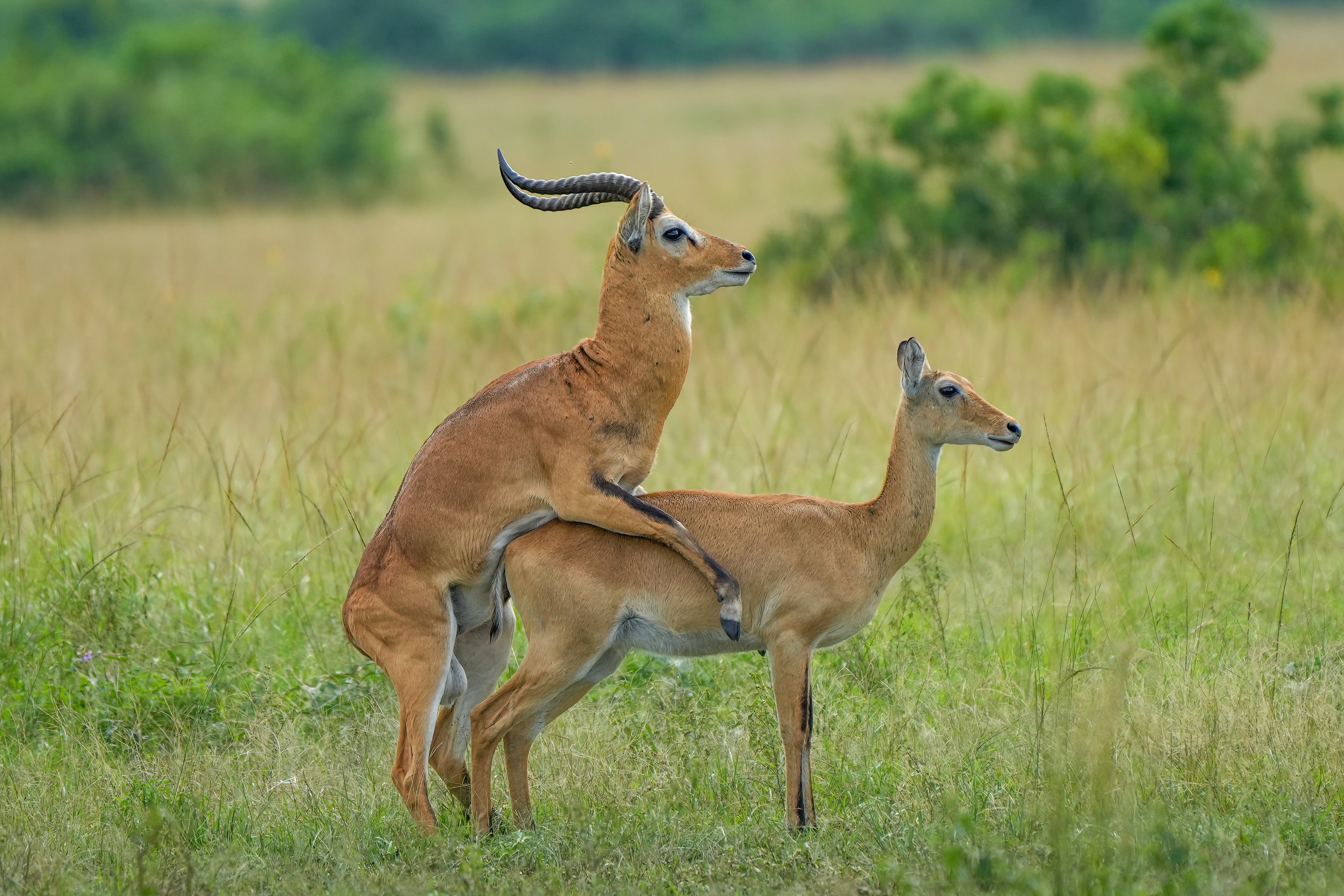
Ugandan kobs mating at Queen Elizabeth National Park.

Ugandan kobs are herbivores and feed largely on grasses and reeds. The females and young males form loose groups of varying size which range according to food availability, often moving along watercourses and grazing in valley bottoms. One group in South Sudan was recorded as travelling 150 to 200 km (93 to 124 mi) during the dry season. Sometimes non-breeding males form their own groups. Females become sexually mature in their second year, but males do not start breeding until they are older.

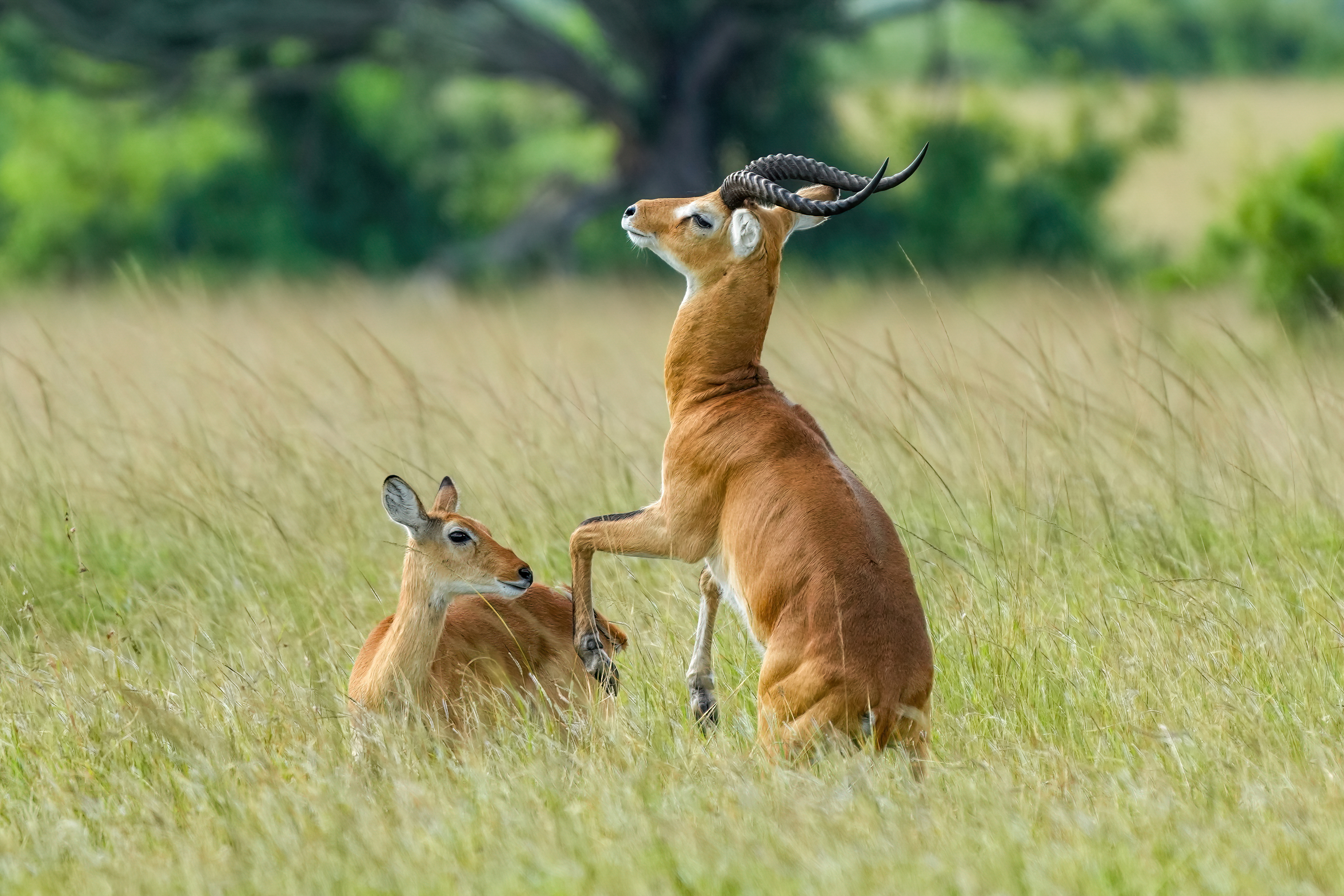
Male Ugandan kob trying to seduce a female at Queen Elizabeth National Park

Larger populations of kob tend to have a lek mating system, the females living in loose groups and only visiting the traditional breeding grounds in order to mate. For this purpose, males hold small territories of up to 200 m (660 ft) in diameter, the smallest territories being in the centre of crowded leks. Calving takes place at the end of the rainy season; a single calf is born in November or December, after a gestation period of about nine months.
