= Conulinus =

Scientific classification
- Kingdom: Animalia
- Phylum: Mollusca
- Class: Gastropoda
- Order: Stylommatophora
- Family: Cerastidae
- Genus: Conulinus; Martens, 1895

Synonyms
- Edouardia Gude, 1914

Genus of gastropods

Conulinus is a genus of gastropods belonging to the family Cerastidae.

The species of this genus are found in Africa.

Species:

- Conulinus carpenteri Connolly, 1927
- Conulinus daubenbergeri (Dautzenberg, 1908)
- Conulinus macroconus (Bourguignat, 1883)
- Conulinus mfwanganensis (Verdcourt, 1963)
- Conulinus rutshuruensis (Pilsbry, 1919)
- Conulinus tener Kobelt, 1903
- Conulinus ugandae (E.von Martens, 1895)
- Conulinus verdcourti Pickford, 2019
