= Trachycystis lamellifera =

Scientific classification
- Domain: Eukaryota
- Kingdom: Animalia
- Phylum: Mollusca
- Class: Gastropoda
- Order: Stylommatophora
- Family: Charopidae
- Genus: Trachycystis
- Species: T. lamellifera

Binomial name
- Trachycystis lamellifera (Smith, 1903)

Species of mollusc

Trachycystis lamellifera is a species of gastropod belonging to the family Charopidae.

The species is found in East Africa.
