= Punctum ugandanum =

Scientific classification
- Kingdom: Animalia
- Phylum: Mollusca
- Class: Gastropoda
- Order: Stylommatophora
- Family: Punctidae
- Genus: Punctum
- Species: P. ugandanum

Binomial name
- Punctum ugandanum (Smith, 1903)

Species of gastropod

Punctum ugandanum is a species of terrestrial gastropod belonging to the family Punctidae.

The species is found in Uganda and Kenya (Mount Kenya).
