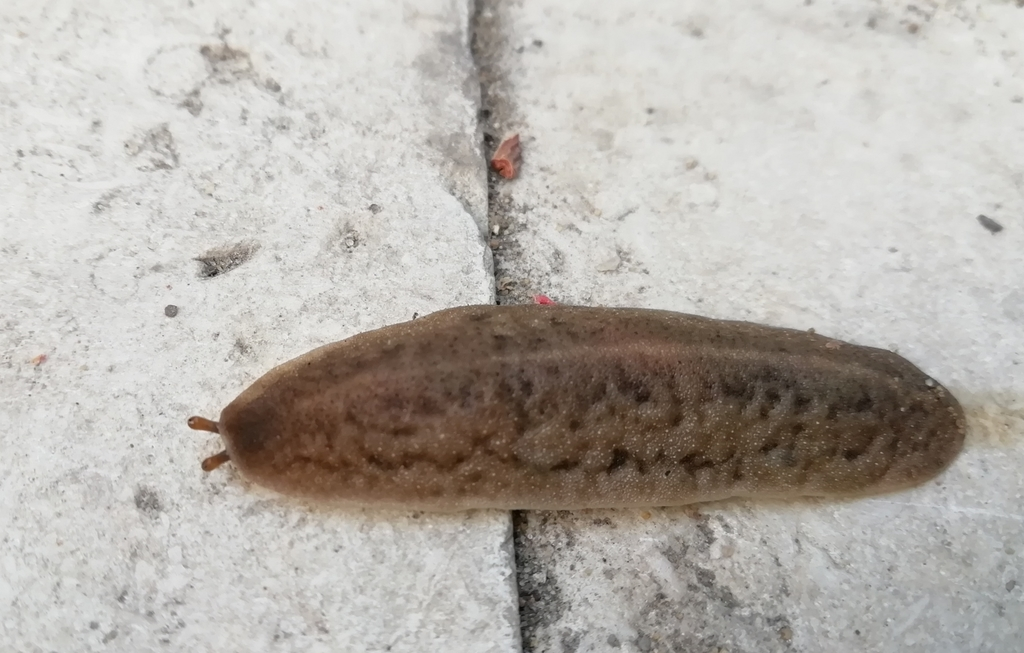
- Laevicaulis stuhlmanni aegypti

Scientific classification
- Kingdom: Animalia
- Phylum: Mollusca
- Class: Gastropoda
- Order: Systellommatophora
- Family: Veronicellidae
- Genus: Laevicaulis
- Species: L. stuhlmanni

Binomial name
- Laevicaulis stuhlmanni Simroth, 1895

Synonyms
- Vaginula stuhlmanni (Simroth, 1895); Eleutherocaulis stuhlmanni (Simroth, 1895); Vaginula aequatorialis (Simroth, 1896); Vaginula brauni (Simroth, 1913); Vaginula schnitzleri (Simroth, 1895)

= Laevicaulis stuhlmanni =

Species of slug

Laevicaulis stuhlmanni is a species of terrestrial, nocturnal slug in the family Veronicellidae. It is native to parts of tropical Africa.

== Description ==
Laevicaulis stuhlmanni shows a flattened body and a dark to light brown colour. Adults are on average 45 mm long and 15.5 mm wide. The weight of an adult averages around 3.5 g.

== Feeding habits ==
Laevicaulis stuhlmanni is a grazer and detritus feeder.

== Distribution ==
Laevicaulis stuhlmanni occurs naturally in tropical regions of Africa, including Congo Kenya, Tanzania and Uganda. It has been introduced to Egypt, where it is viewed as a serious agricultural pest.

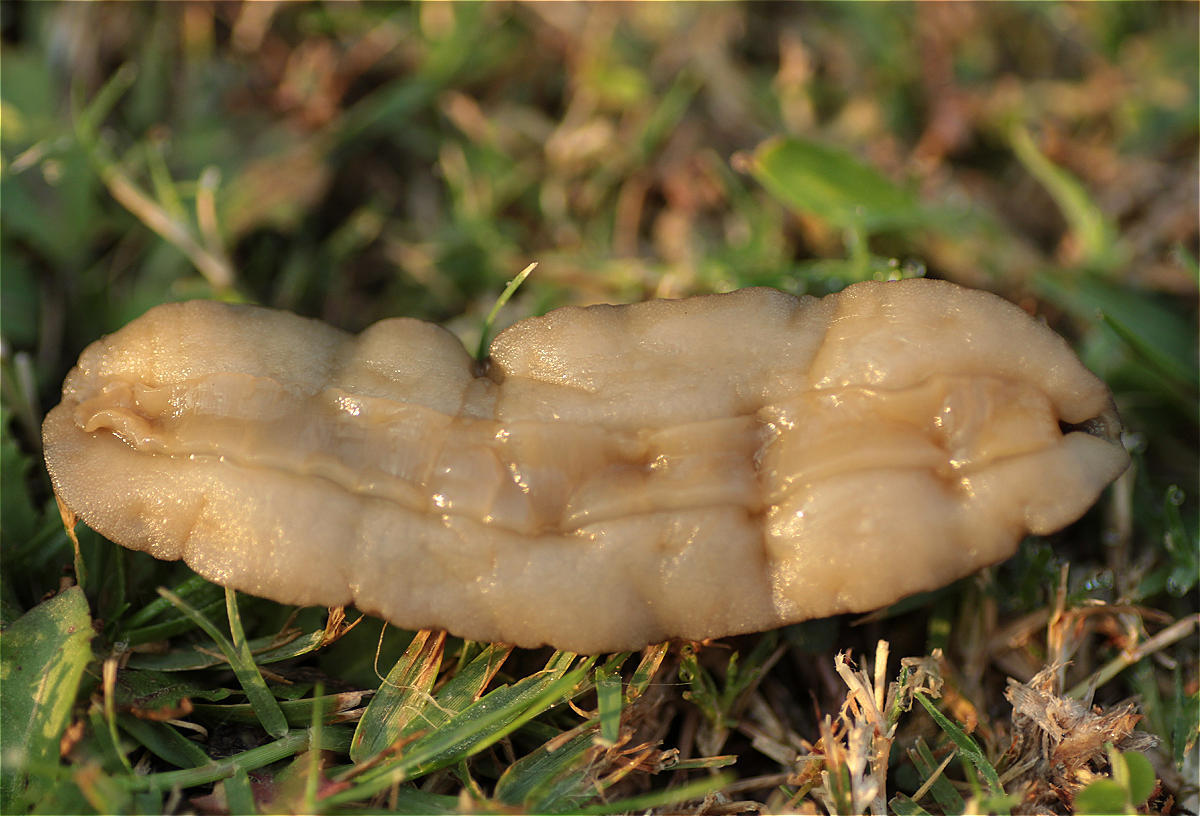
Underside of Laevicaulis stuhlmanni aegypti showing its thin foot embedded in the thick outer mantle.

== Life cycle ==
In Egypt the reproductive season of Leavicaulis stuhlmanni starts in March or April, when the temperature rises, and lasts until November. They are hermaphrodites and self-fertilization is common. During the oviposition period each slug can produce 5 clutches over the course of 46 days. Under laboratory conditions Leavicaulis stuhlmanni lays individual egg clutches containing up to 140 oval to spherical elongated, clear translucent eggs. The clutch is covered with a soil-rich fecal pellet-ribbon that helps maintain a high humidity within it. Incubation period ranges from 10 to 19 days at a temperature of around 30°C and a humidity between 52 % and 64 %. Laevicaulis stuhlmanni reaches sexual maturity 2 to 3 months after hatching, depending on climatic conditions. Total life span is between 5 and 6 months.
