= Wildlife of Uganda =

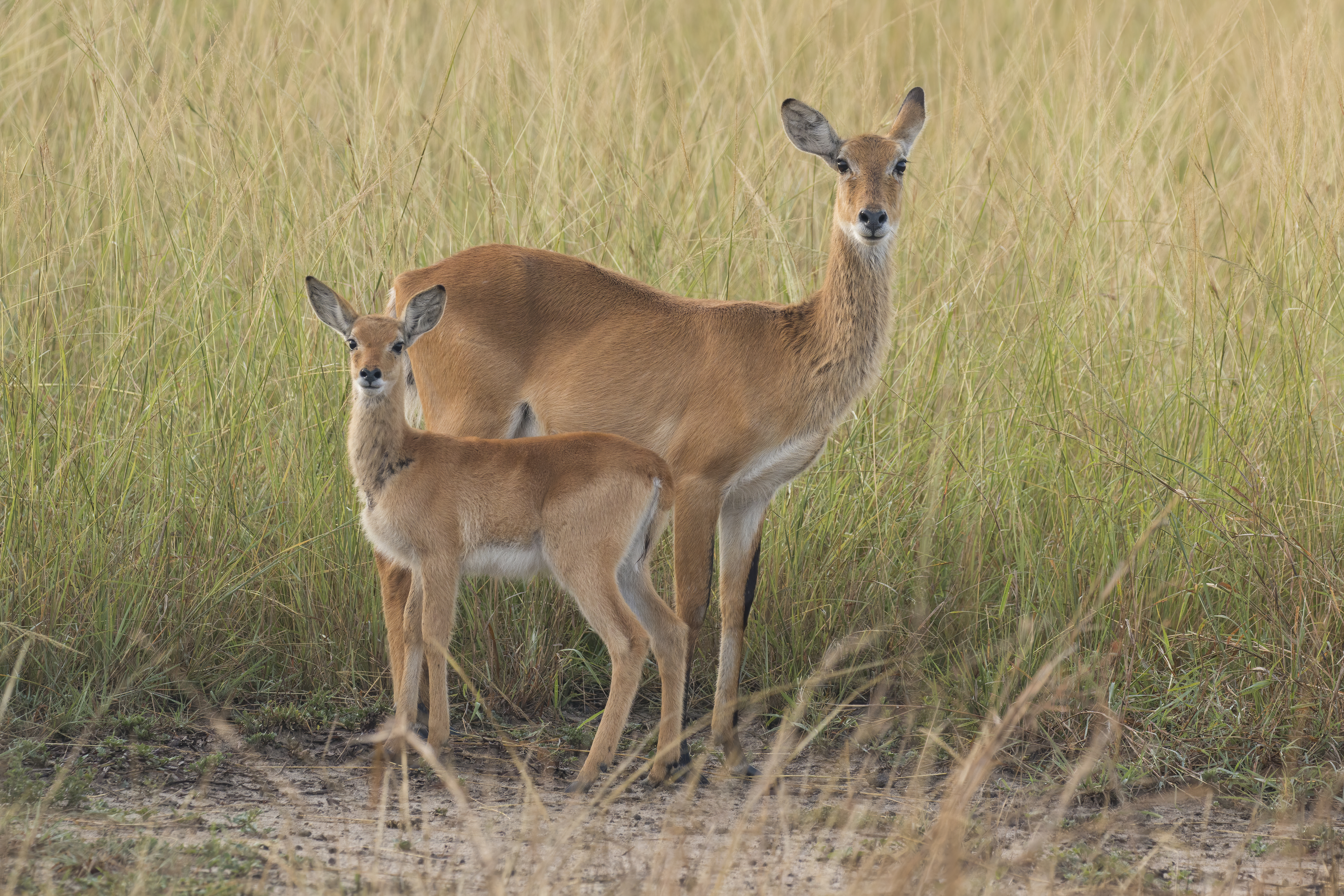
Ugandan kob female and calf, Semliki Wildlife Reserve

The wildlife of Uganda is composed of its flora and fauna. Uganda has a wide variety of different habitats, including mountains, hills, tropical rainforest, woodland, freshwater lakes, swamps and savanna with scattered clumps of trees. The country has a biodiverse flora and fauna reflecting this range of habitats and is known for its primates, including gorillas and chimpanzees. There are ten national parks and thirteen wildlife reserves; some 345 species of mammal and 1020 species of bird have been recorded in the country.

== Geography ==
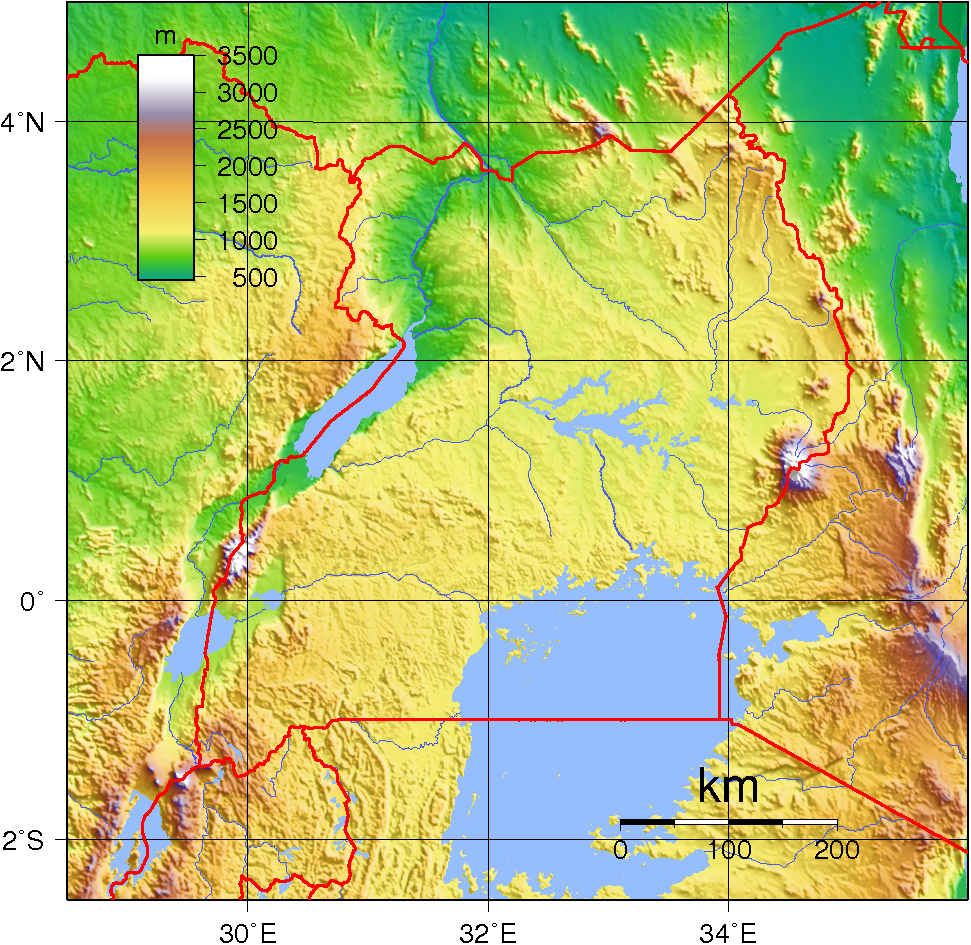
Topography of Uganda

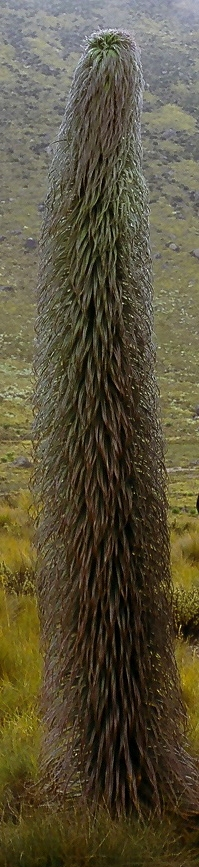
The flower spike of Lobelia telekii can grow up to 3 metres (10 ft) tall

Uganda is a large country in East Africa lying on the equator. It is bounded by the Democratic Republic of the Congo to the west, South Sudan to the north, Kenya to the east and Rwanda and Tanzania to the south. Three large lakes, Lake Victoria, Lake Edward and Lake Albert lie on the borders and Lake Kyoga lies in the centre. The country forms part of the Lake Victoria Basin and consists mainly of a plateau about 1,000 m (3,300 ft) above sea level. Higher land in the southwest rises to the Rwenzori Mountains on the border with Rwanda, while on the eastern border are a chain of mountains, the highest point being the shield volcano of Mount Elgon (4,321 m (14,177 ft)). The Imatong Mountains lie on the northern border with South Sudan.

Nearly one-fifth of the country is open water or swampland. Lake Victoria is drained by the River Nile which flows through the even shallower Lake Kyoga, part of a complex of periodically flooded lakes and swampland, Lake Opeta forming a separate lake during the dry season. Lake Albert and Lake Edward are deep water lakes lying in the Albertine branch of the Rift Valley.

== Conservation ==
Uganda has ten national parks and thirteen wildlife reserves and sanctuaries, and in these areas, the protection of nature takes precedence over human development. When they were set up, many of these protected areas were selected examples of habitat types in the country, but with the increase in the human population, and the requirement of these people for land for agriculture, timber extraction, mining and other purposes, the preserved areas have often become the only remaining natural habitats. Overfishing, hunting, disease and climate change may be responsible for some species suffering declines or becoming extinct, so the preserved areas have a vital role to play in the preservation of the country's biodiversity.

== Biodiversity ==
Uganda is a landlocked country covering an area of 236,000 km^{2} (91,000 sq mi) of which 82% is dry land, 14% is open water and 4% is a permanent swamp. The country is among those endowed with the greatest diversity of animal and plant species and ranks among the top ten most bio-diverse countries in the world.

=== Flora ===
About 4,500 species of vascular plants have been recorded in Uganda.

The Imatong Mountains have a rich biodiverse flora with much endemism; 1145 species of vascular plant have been recorded here including 110 species of fern. The plains and the lower parts of the mountains are covered by deciduous woodland, wooded grassland and bamboo thickets, while the areas to the east and southeast are in the rain shadow of the mountains, with dry subdesert grassland or deciduous or semi-evergreen bush. The plant diversity of the mountains is due to their position between the West African rain forest, the Ethiopian plateau and the East African mountains, coupled with their relative isolation for long periods during which new species could emerge. Vegetation in the lower areas includes woodlands of Albizia and Terminalia, and mixed Khaya lowland semi-evergreen forest up to 1,000 metres (3,300 ft). Above 1,000 metres (3,300 ft) there is montane forest with Podocarpus, Croton, Macaranga and Albizia up to 2,900 metres (9,500 ft). At the highest levels, the forest is replaced by Hagenia woodland, Erica (heather) thicket and areas of bamboo.

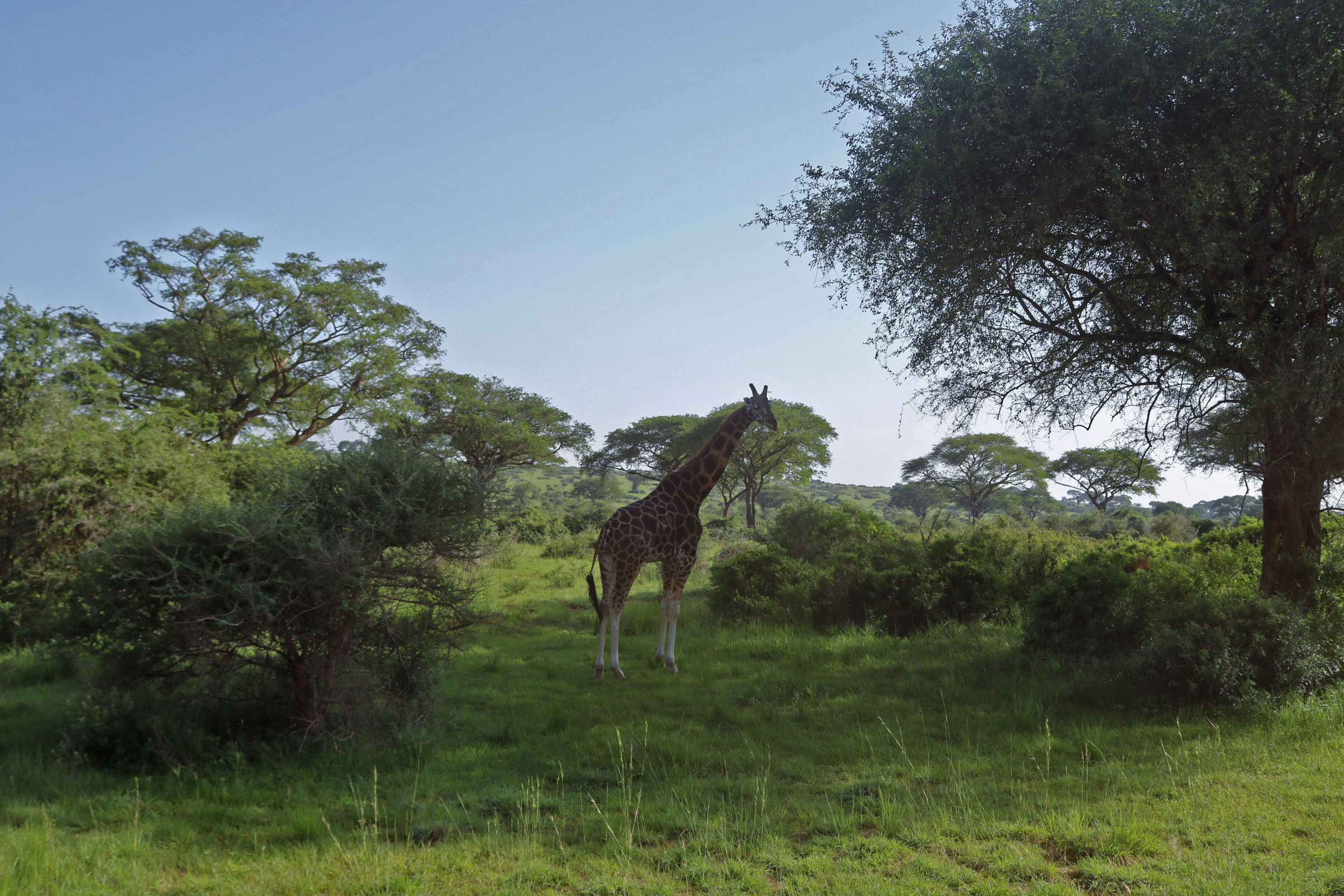
A Nubian giraffe in Murchision Falls National Park

In the northwest of the country, in the Murchison Falls National Park, 80% of the tree cover has been lost over several decades and the remaining woodland is dominated by Terminalia schimperiana and Prosopis africana, the balance being created by herbivores, which suppress regeneration, and fires which favour fire-tolerant species. In the Semliki National Park in the west of the country, the vegetation is predominantly medium altitude moist evergreen to semi-deciduous forest with Cynometra alexandri being the dominant species of tree.

In the east, Mount Elgon has several vegetation zones. At middle elevations there is montane forest with Olea hochstetteri and Aningeria adolfi-friederici, which give way to Afrocarpus gracilior and olive forest at higher elevations. Higher still, there is a zone of Afrocarpus and the bamboo Yushania alpina, and the summit moorland has tussock grasses, heaths, low herbs, giant lobelias and groundsels.

=== Fauna ===
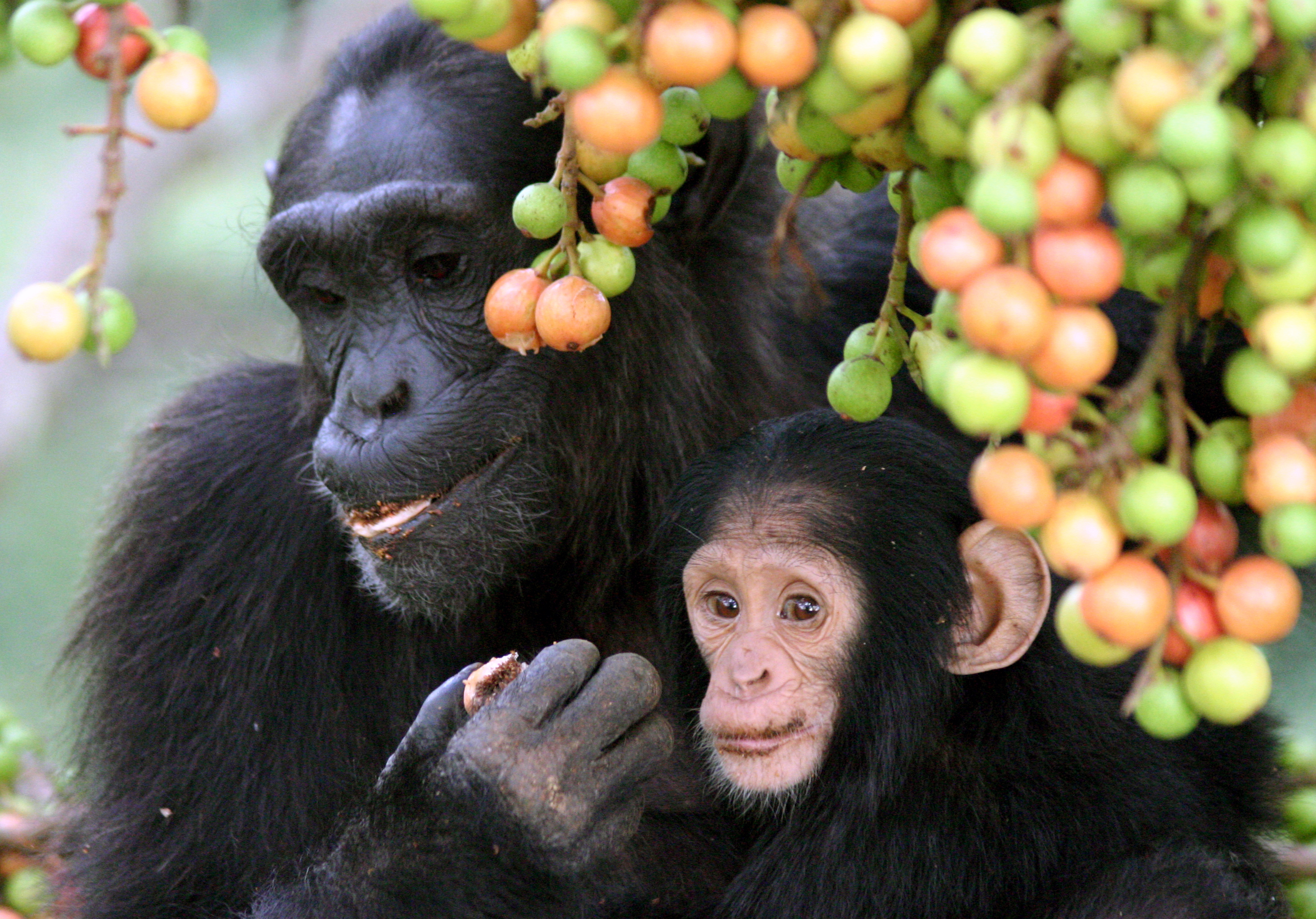
Mother and juvenile chimpanzees eating Ficus fruit in Kibale National Park

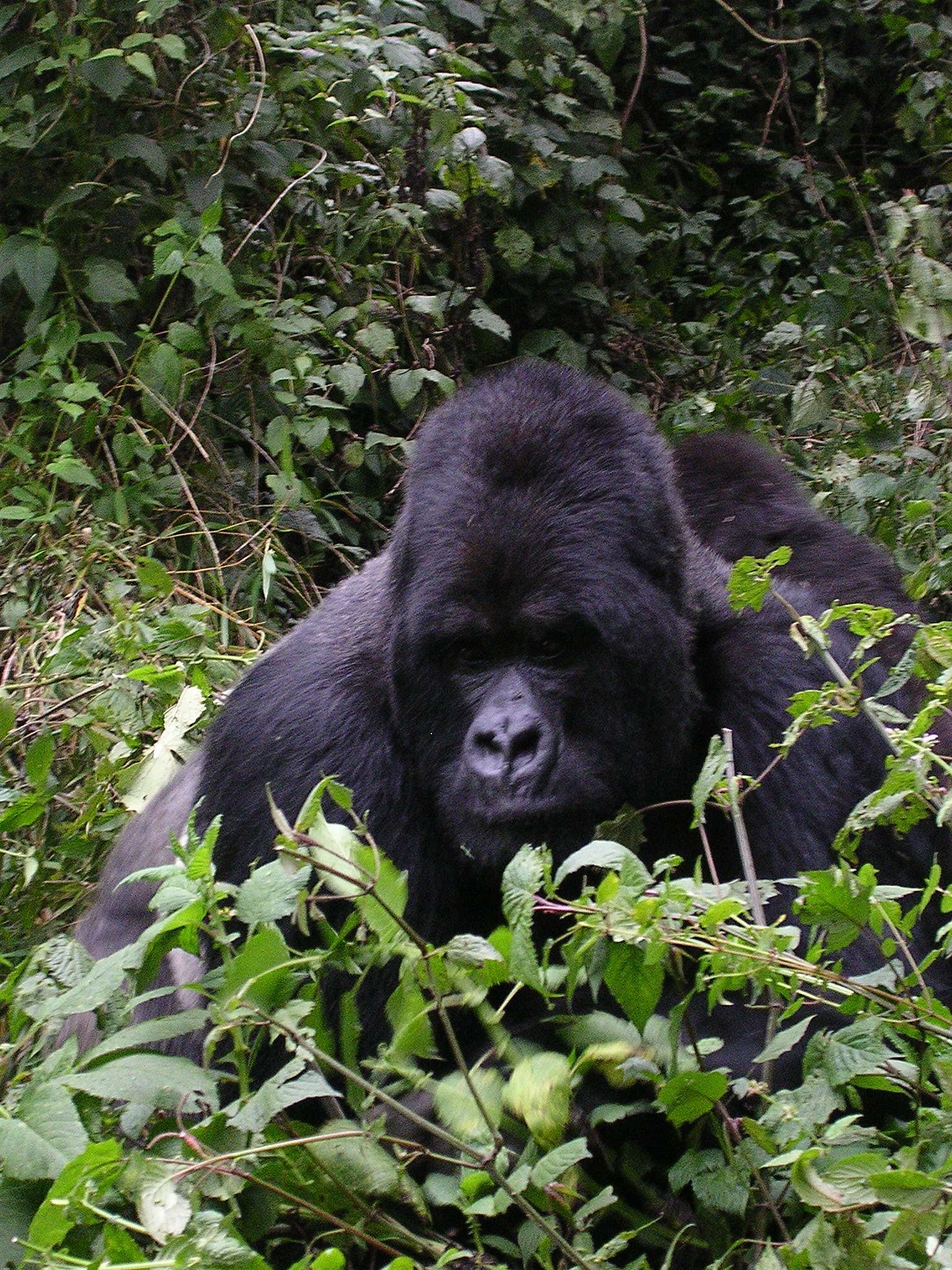
Mountain gorilla

With its wide range of habitat types, Uganda is regarded as a hotspot for biodiversity. Some 345 species of mammals have been recorded in the country, along with 1,020 species of bird (around half of the total number found in Africa), 142 species of reptile, 86 species of amphibian, 501 species of fish and 1,242 species of butterfly.

Nearly half of the mountain gorillas in the world live in the Bwindi Impenetrable National Park, and it is also a sanctuary for colobus monkeys and chimpanzees, and birds such as hornbills and turacos. In the Queen Elizabeth National Park there are 95 species of mammal, including African buffalo, Ugandan kob, hippopotamus, African bush elephant, African leopard, lion, and chimpanzee. The area around Ishasha in Rukungiri District is famous for its tree-climbing lions, whose males sport black manes.

In Kibale National Park there are 13 species of primates. These include several habituated communities of common chimpanzee, as well as several species of Central African monkey including the Uganda mangabey, the Ugandan red colobus and the L'Hoest's monkey. Other primates that are found in the park include the black-and-white colobus and the blue monkey. The park's population of elephants travels between the park and Queen Elizabeth National Park. Other terrestrial mammals that are found within Kibale National Park include red and blue duikers, bushbucks, sitatungas, bushpigs, giant forest hogs, common warthogs, and African buffalo. The carnivores that are present include leopards, African golden cats, servals, different mongooses and two species of otter. In addition, lions visit the park on occasion. Birdlife is also plentiful, and includes the olive long-tailed cuckoo, the western tinkerbird, two species of pittas (African and green-breasted) and the grey parrot.
