= Louis Germain =

French malacologist

Alfred Louis Pierre Germain (8 January 1878 – 18 October 1942) was a French malacologist born in Niort, department Deux-Sèvres.

He studied in Angers and Paris, obtaining his doctorate of sciences in 1907. Later he worked under Louis Joubin in the laboratory of mollusks, worms and zoophytes at the Muséum national d'histoire naturelle in Paris. From 1936 to 1942, he was director of the museum.

Recently (2010), a new genus of freshwater mussels from Madagascar called Germainaia was introduced into science.

== Written works ==
- Étude sur les mollusques terrestres et fluviatiles vivants des environs d'Angers et du département de Maine-et-Loire, Bulletin of the Society of Natural Sciences of Western France, 1903 – Study of terrestrial and fluviatile mollusks living in the vicinity of Angers and the department of Maine-et-Loire.
- Les mollusques terrestres & fluviatiles de l'Afrique centrale française, 1907 - Terrestrial and fluviatile mollusks of French central Africa.
- Gastéropodes pulmonés et prosobranches terrestres et fluviatiles dans la Mollusques de la France et des régions voisines, 1913 - Pulmonata gastropods, terrestrial & fluviatile Prosobranchia, Mollusca of France and neighboring regions.
- Chetognathes provenant des campagnes des yachts Hirondelle et Princesse-Alice (1885-1910), 1916 - Chaetognatha from campaigns of the yachts Hirondelle and Princesse-Alice (1885-1910).
- La Biogéographie et les musées régionaux, Annales de Géographie, 1918 - Biogeography and regional museums.
- Contributions àla faune malacologique de Madagascar. Les pélécypodes fluviatiles de Madagascar. Bulletin du Muséum National d'Histoire Naturelle, 24:34–42. 1918 - Contributions to the malacological fauna of Madagascar, fluviatile pelecypods.
- Mollusques terrestres et fluviatiles, 1920 - Fluvial and terrestrial molluscs.
- Mollusques terrestres et fluviatiles de Syrie dans Voyage zoologique d'Henri Gadeau de Kerville en Syrie, 1926 - Terrestrial and fluviatile mollusks of Syria from the zoological voyage of Henri Gadeau de Kerville.
- La vie des animaux à la surface des continents, 1924 - Animal life on the surface of continents.
- L’Atlantide, Revue scientifique, August 9 and 23, 1924
- La faune des lacs, des étangs et des marais, 1925 - Fauna of lakes, ponds and marshes.
