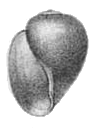
- Drawing of apertural view of the shell of Bulinus jousseaumei by Arnould Locard from its type description by Philippe Dautzenberg (1890)

Conservation status
- Least Concern (IUCN 3.1)

Scientific classification
- Kingdom: Animalia
- Phylum: Mollusca
- Class: Gastropoda
- Superorder: Hygrophila
- Family: Bulinidae
- Genus: Bulinus
- Species: B. jousseaumei

Binomial name
- Bulinus jousseaumei (Dautzenberg, 1890)

Synonyms
- Isidora jousseaumei Dautzenberg, 1890

= Bulinus jousseaumei =

Species of gastropod

Bulinus jousseaumei is a species of tropical freshwater snail, an aquatic gastropod mollusk in the family Planorbidae, the ramshorn snails and their allies. Like other planorbids, the shell of the species is sinistral in coiling.

== Distribution ==
The distribution of Bulinus jousseaumei includes Western Africa:

- Burkina Faso
- Gambia
- Mali
- Niger
- Nigeria
- Senegal
- Togo

The type locality for this species is the Sénégal River close to Médine, Mali.

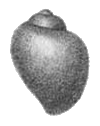
Abapertural view of shell

== Description ==
The width of the shell is 8 mm. The height of the shell is 11 mm.

Diploid chromosome number is 2n = 36.

== Ecology ==
This snail lives in permanent streams. It can live in a water current that has a speed up to 0.86 m·s^{−1} based on laboratory experiments.

The male part of the reproductive system is developed "slightly earlier" (protandry) in Bulinus jousseaumei.

This species is an intermediate host for Schistosoma curassoni and for Schistosoma haematobium.
