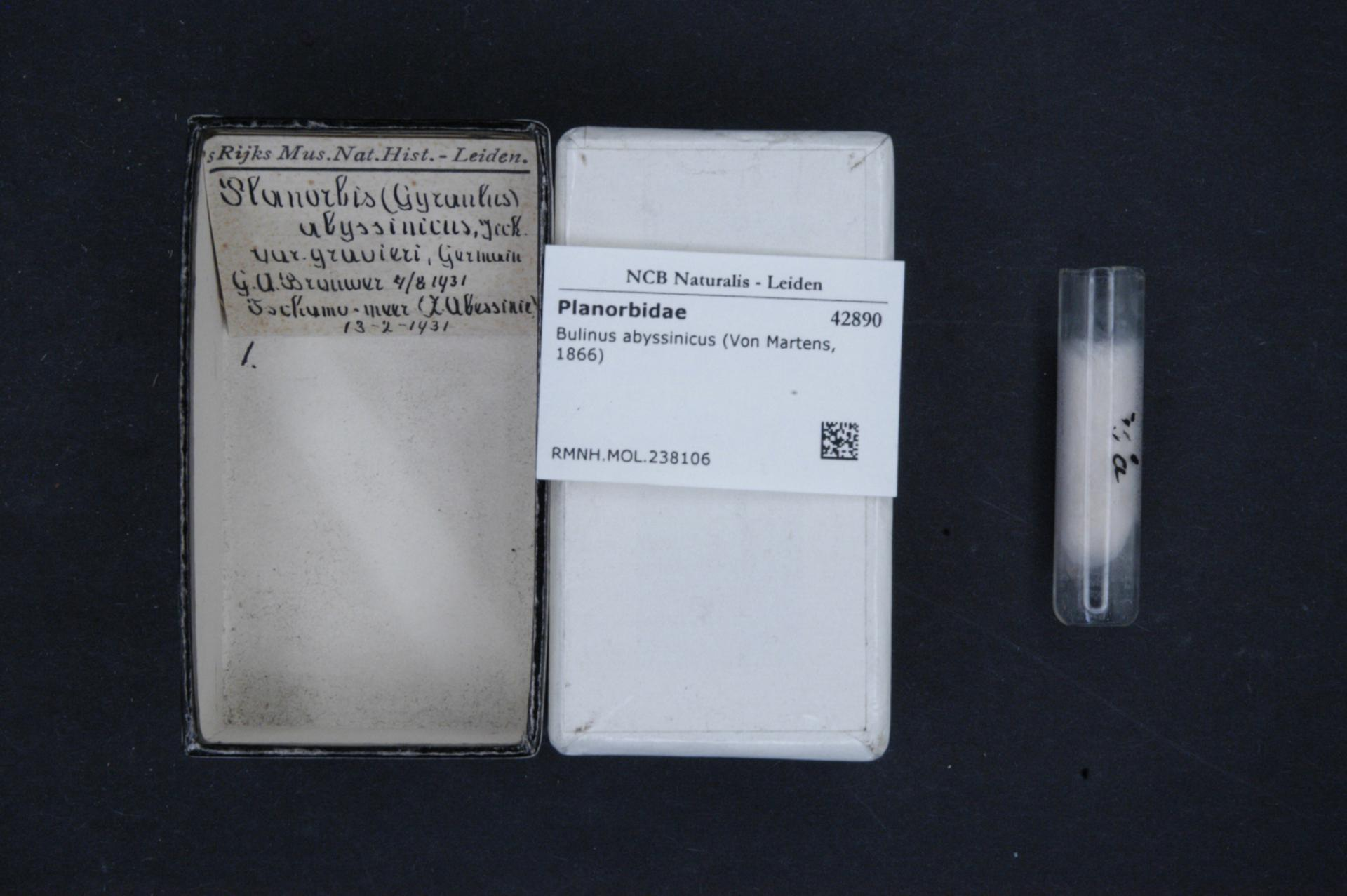
- Bulinus abyssinicus

Conservation status
- Least Concern (IUCN 3.1)

Scientific classification
- Kingdom: Animalia
- Phylum: Mollusca
- Class: Gastropoda
- Superorder: Hygrophila
- Family: Bulinidae
- Genus: Bulinus
- Species: B. abyssinicus

Binomial name
- Bulinus abyssinicus (von Martens, 1866)

Synonyms
- Physa (Physopsis) abyssinica Martens, 1866; Physopsis meneliki Bourguignat, 1885; Physopsis soleilleti Bourguignat, 1885

= Bulinus abyssinicus =

Species of mollusc

Bulinus abyssinicus is a species of tropical freshwater snail with a sinistral shell, an aquatic gastropod mollusk in the family Planorbidae, the ramshorn snails and their allies.

The specific name abyssinicus is after Abyssinia, which was the historic name for the Ethiopian Empire, where its type locality is.

== Distribution ==
The distribution of Bulinus abyssinicus includes the Lower Valley of the Awash, Ethiopia and Somalia.

The type locality is "southern Abyssinia", which means the Ethiopian Empire, now Ethiopia.

== Description ==
The width of the shell is 9 mm. The height of the shell is 14 mm.

The diploid chromosome number is 2n = 36.

== Ecology ==
This small snail resides in marshes and in pools.

This species is an intermediate host for Schistosoma bovis and Schistosoma haematobium.
