= Bulinus nasutus =

Conservation status
- Least Concern (IUCN 3.1)

Scientific classification
- Kingdom: Animalia
- Phylum: Mollusca
- Class: Gastropoda
- Superorder: Hygrophila
- Family: Bulinidae
- Genus: Bulinus
- Species: B. nasutus

Binomial name
- Bulinus nasutus (von Martens, 1879)

Synonyms
- Bulinus praeclara (Bourguignat, 1879); Physopsis nasutus Martens, 1879; Bulinus productus (Mandahl-Barth, 1960)

Species of gastropod

Bulinus nasutus is a species of tropical freshwater snail with a sinistral shell, an aquatic gastropod mollusk in the family Planorbidae, the ramshorn snails and their allies.

== Subspecies ==
- Bulinus nasutus nasutus
- Bulinus nasutus productus Mandahl-Barth, 1960

== Distribution ==
The distribution of Bulinus nasutus includes three countries in East Africa:

- Kenya
- Tanzania including Zanzibar and Pemba Island
- Uganda

Type locality is Bagamoyo, now in Tanzania.

== Description ==
The width of the shell is 12 mm. The height of the shell is 25 mm.

The diploid chromosome number is 2n = 36.

== Ecology ==
Bulinus nasutus lives in temporary pools, ditches and burrow-pits.

High concentration of chloride (468-2220 ppm Cl) have been found in pools inhabited by Bulinus nasutus in Tanzania.

Bulinus nasutus can aestivate in the dry mud for about 5–8 months. Respiration of Bulinus nasutus during aestivation is probably aerobic. They aestivate on margins of pools, and thus stop aestivation only in optimal conditions, when the pool has much water.

Webbe (1962, 1965) described population dynamics of Bulinus nasutus in Tanzania.

Mature snails lay eggs during the whole life span, primarily immediately after the main rainfall. Snails 8 weeks old, whose shell is about 8 mm in height, are mature and can lay eggs. However they require more than 12 months of life and 1-2 aestivation periods in order to reach their full size.

This species is an intermediate host for:

- Schistosoma bovis
- Schistosoma haematobium - it is the main intermediate host of Schistosoma haematobium in northwestern Tanzania
- Echinostome spp.
