= Bulinus succinoides =

Conservation status
- Endangered (IUCN 3.1)

Scientific classification
- Kingdom: Animalia
- Phylum: Mollusca
- Class: Gastropoda
- Superorder: Hygrophila
- Family: Bulinidae
- Genus: Bulinus
- Species: B. succinoides

Binomial name
- Bulinus succinoides (E. A. Smith, 1877)

Synonyms
- Physa succinoides E. A. Smith, 1877

Species of gastropod

Bulinus succinoides is a species of freshwater snail, a gastropod in the Planorbidae family. It is endemic to Lake Malawi.
