= Bulinus browni =

Conservation status
- Near Threatened (IUCN 3.1)

Scientific classification
- Kingdom: Animalia
- Phylum: Mollusca
- Class: Gastropoda
- Superorder: Hygrophila
- Family: Bulinidae
- Genus: Bulinus
- Species: B. browni

Binomial name
- Bulinus browni Jelnes, 1979

Species of gastropod

Bulinus browni is a species of freshwater snail, a gastropod in the family Planorbidae. It is endemic to Kenya.
