= Bulinus transversalis =

Conservation status
- Vulnerable (IUCN 2.3)

Scientific classification
- Kingdom: Animalia
- Phylum: Mollusca
- Class: Gastropoda
- Superorder: Hygrophila
- Family: Bulinidae
- Genus: Bulinus
- Species: B. transversalis

Binomial name
- Bulinus transversalis Von Martens, 1897

Species of gastropod

Bulinus transversalis is a species of small air-breathing freshwater snail with a sinistral shell, an aquatic pulmonate gastropod mollusk in the family Planorbidae, the ramshorn snails and their allies.

This species is found in Kenya and Uganda.
