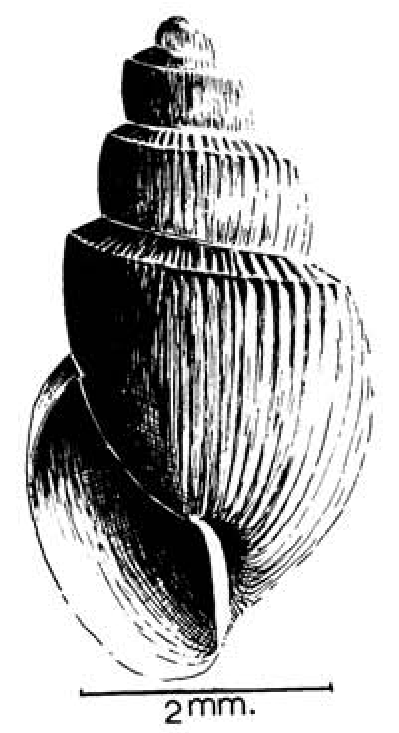
- an apertural view of the shell of Bulinus forskalii

Conservation status
- Least Concern (IUCN 3.1)

Scientific classification
- Kingdom: Animalia
- Phylum: Mollusca
- Class: Gastropoda
- Superorder: Hygrophila
- Family: Bulinidae
- Genus: Bulinus
- Species: B. forskalii

Binomial name
- Bulinus forskalii (Ehrenberg, 1831)

Synonyms
- Bulinus (Pyrgophysa) forskalii (Ehrenberg, 1831)· accepted, alternate representation; Bulinus (Pyrgophysa) mariei (Crosse, 1879) (junior synonym); Isidora forskalii Ehrenberg, 1831; Physa apiculata Morelet, 1867 (junior synonym); Physa capillacea Morelet, 1867 (junior synonym); Physa clavulata Morelet, 1867 (junior synonym); Physa gradata Melvill & Ponsonby, 1898; Physa semiplicata Morelet, 1867 (junior synonym); Physa turriculata Morelet, 1867 (junior synonym); Physa wahlbergi F. Krauss, 1848; Pyrgophysa mariei Crosse, 1879

= Bulinus forskalii =

Species of gastropod

Bulinus forskalii is a species of tropical freshwater snail with a sinistral shell, an aquatic gastropod mollusk in the family Bulinidae, the ramshorn snails and their allies.

== Distribution ==
Bulinus forskalii is an afrotropical species which occurs in number of countries in Africa:

- Northern Africa: only in Egypt and Sudan.
- Western Africa: Benin, Burkina Faso, Côte d'Ivoire, Gambia, Ghana, Guinea, Guinea-Bissau, Liberia, Mali, Niger, Senegal and Togo.
- Eastern Africa: Burundi, Ethiopia, Kenya, Malawi, Mozambique, Somalia, Tanzania, Zambia and Zimbabwe.
- Central Africa: Angola, Cameroon, Central African Republic, Chad, Democratic Republic of the Congo, Republic of the Congo, Equatorial Guinea and Gabon. An extreme variant of Bulinus forskalii lives also on São Tomé Island.
- Southern Africa: South Africa and Eswatini.

This species has been recently introduced to Madagascar.

Its presence is uncertain in Mauritania, Nigeria and in Sierra Leone.

== Ecology ==
The natural habitats for this species are lake margins, swamps, marshes and wetland areas. It lives in all types of freshwater bodies and it has been found mainly in dams and brooks in South Africa. The substratum is often muddy.

Bulinus forskalii is a hermaphroditic species. Self-fertilization can occur.

Parasites of Bulinus forskalii include:

- as intermediate host for Schistosoma guineensis
- as intermediate host for Schistosoma intercalatum
- as intermediate host for Schistosoma haematobium – experimental infection in Niger, but incompatible in South Africa
- as intermediate host for Gastrodiscus aegyptiacus, that causes gastrodiscosis in horses
- three species of paramphistomes (superfamily Paramphistomoidea)

It has been found incompatible with Schistosoma mattheei in South Africa.
