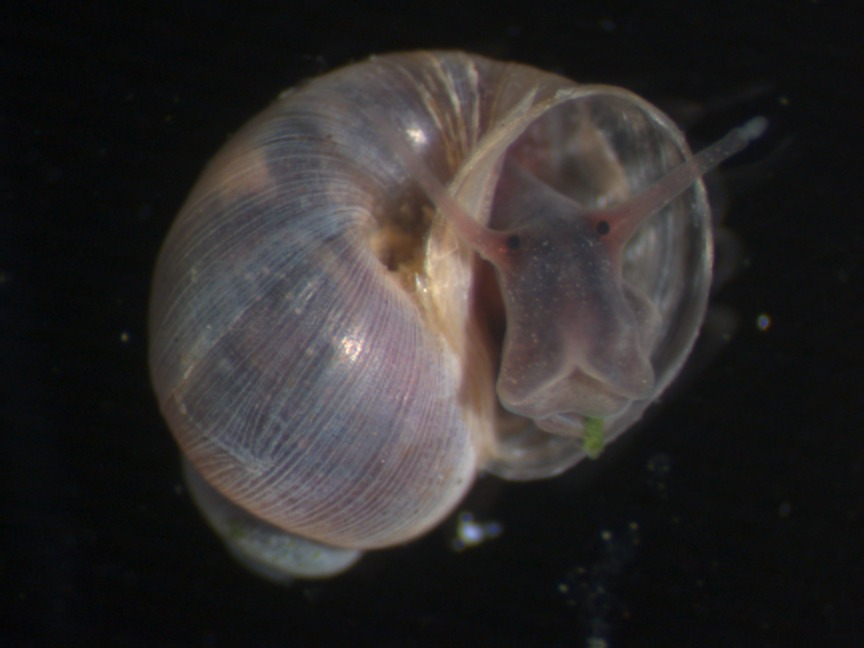
- Bulinus wrighti

Scientific classification
- Kingdom: Animalia
- Phylum: Mollusca
- Class: Gastropoda
- Superorder: Hygrophila
- Family: Bulinidae
- Genus: Bulinus
- Species: B. wrighti

Binomial name
- Bulinus wrighti Mandahl-Barth, 1965

= Bulinus wrighti =

Species of gastropod

Bulinus wrighti is a species of small tropical air-breathing freshwater snail with a sinistral shell, an aquatic pulmonate gastropod mollusk in the family Bulinidae.

== Distribution ==
The type locality is Wadi Hatib, at about 1280 m. southeast of Nisab District, Upper Aulaqui District at Rassais, South Yemen.
