= Bulinus mutandensis =

Conservation status
- Vulnerable (IUCN 3.1)

Scientific classification
- Kingdom: Animalia
- Phylum: Mollusca
- Class: Gastropoda
- Superorder: Hygrophila
- Family: Bulinidae
- Genus: Bulinus
- Species: B. mutandensis

Binomial name
- Bulinus mutandensis Preston, 1913

Species of gastropod

Bulinus mutandensis is a species of freshwater gastropod in the Planorbidae family. It is endemic to Uganda. Its natural habitat is freshwater lakes.
