= Bulinus hightoni =

Conservation status
- Near Threatened (IUCN 3.1)

Scientific classification
- Kingdom: Animalia
- Phylum: Mollusca
- Class: Gastropoda
- Superorder: Hygrophila
- Family: Bulinidae
- Genus: Bulinus
- Species: B. hightoni

Binomial name
- Bulinus hightoni Brown & Wright, 1978

Species of gastropod

Bulinus hightoni is a species of freshwater snail, an aquatic gastropod mollusk in the family Planorbidae, the ram's horn snails.

== Distribution ==
This species is endemic to Kenya, Africa.

== Habitat ==
This snail lives in rivers, intermittent rivers, and shrub-dominated wetlands. The survival of hits species is threatened by habitat loss.
