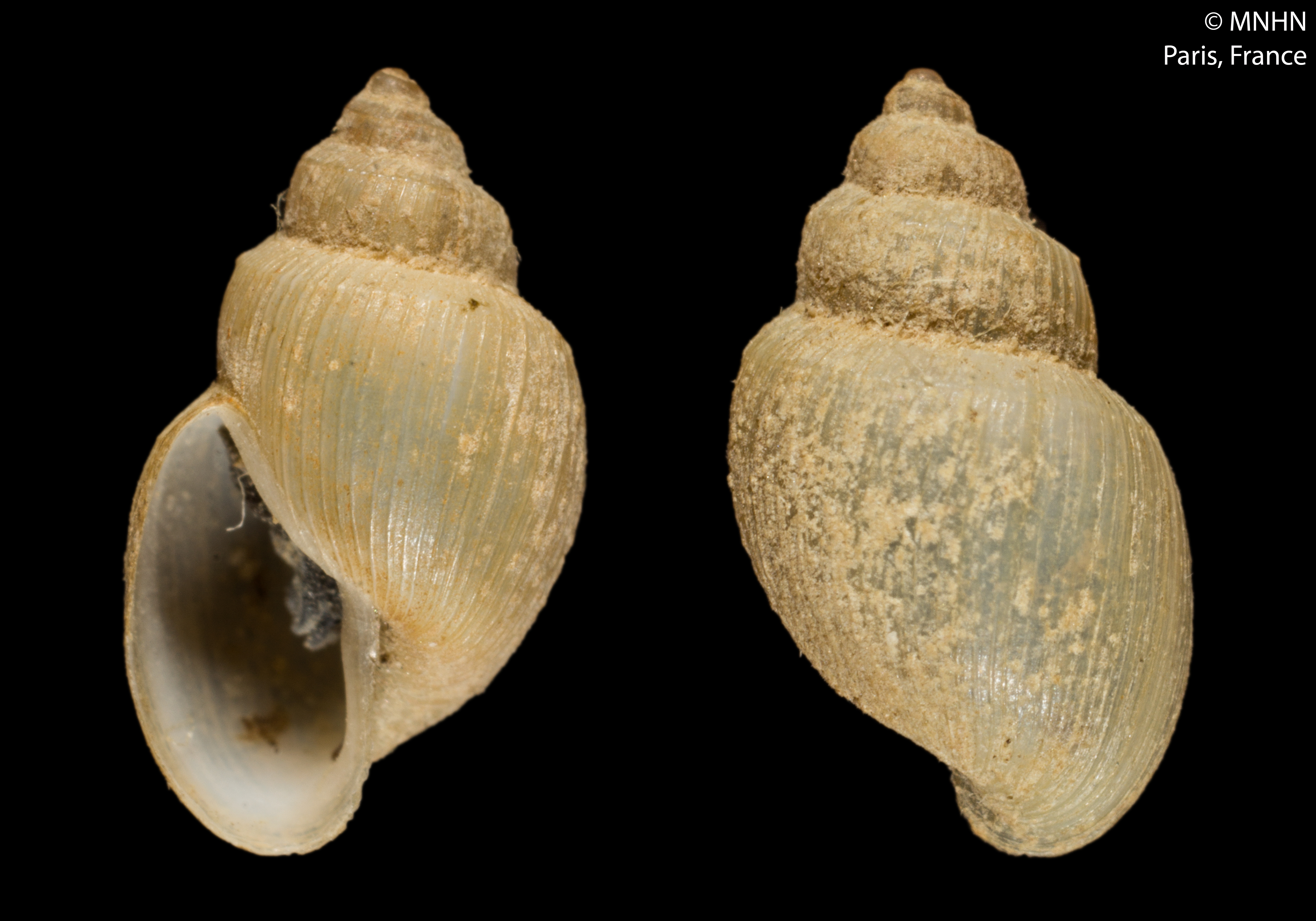
- Shell of Bulinus crystallinus (syntype at MNHN, Paris)

Conservation status
- Data Deficient (IUCN 3.1)

Scientific classification
- Kingdom: Animalia
- Phylum: Mollusca
- Class: Gastropoda
- Superorder: Hygrophila
- Family: Bulinidae
- Genus: Bulinus
- Species: B. crystallinus

Binomial name
- Bulinus crystallinus (Morelet, 1868)

Synonyms
- Physa crystallina Morelet, 1867 (original combination)

= Bulinus crystallinus =

Species of gastropod

Bulinus crystallinus is a species of small air-breathing freshwater snail with a sinistral shell, an aquatic pulmonate gastropod mollusk in the family Bulinidae, the ramshorn snails and their allies.

== Distribution ==
This species is found in Angola and Gabon.
