= Bulinus hexaploidus =

Conservation status
- Data Deficient (IUCN 3.1)

Scientific classification
- Kingdom: Animalia
- Phylum: Mollusca
- Class: Gastropoda
- Superorder: Hygrophila
- Family: Bulinidae
- Genus: Bulinus
- Species: B. hexaploidus

Binomial name
- Bulinus hexaploidus Burch, 1972

Species of gastropod

Bulinus hexaploidus is a species of freshwater snail, a gastropod in the Planorbidae family. It is endemic to Ethiopia.
