= Cavu =

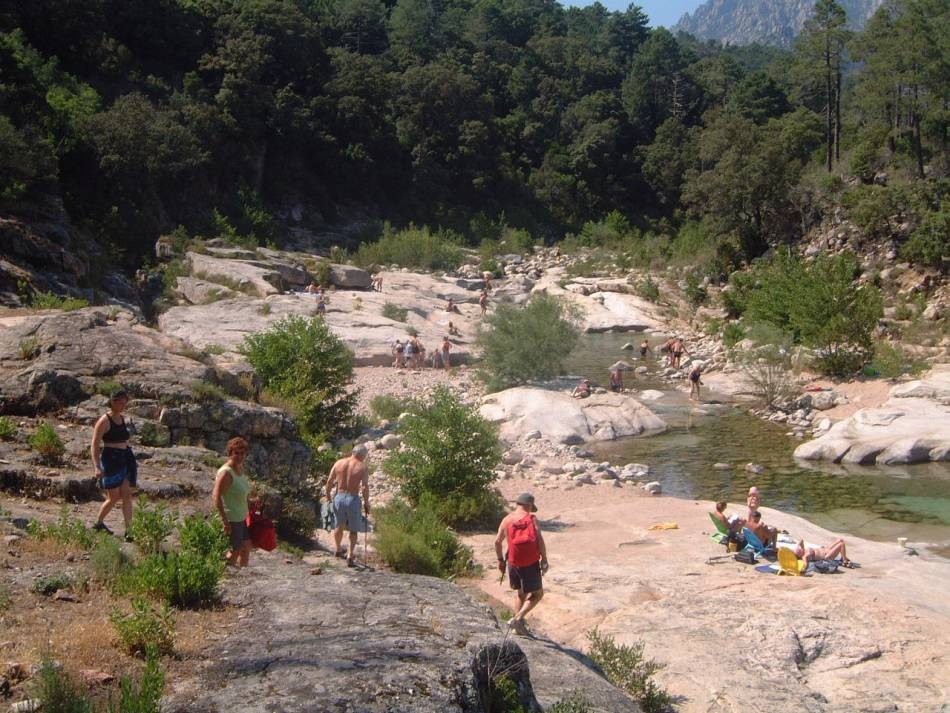
- Bathers along the course of the Cavu

Location
- Country: France
- Region: Corsica

Physical characteristics
- Source
  - location: 1 km au north-east of Puntacci
  - elevation: 950 m (3,120 ft)
- Mouth
  - location: Tyrrhenian Sea
  - elevation: 0 m (0 ft)
- Length: 21.9 km (13.6 mi)
- Basin size: 48.9 km^{2} (18.9 sq mi)
- Discharge
  - average: 1.18 m^{3}/s (42 cu ft/s) at Zonza

The Cavu or rivière de Cavu, (also called rivière de Cavo, ruisseau de Sainte-Lucie, ruisseau de Finicione) is a short river in the Corse-du-Sud department of Corsica which discharges into the Tyrrhenian Sea, and the Mediterranean Sea. In 2014 the Cavu became the first place of re-emerging schistosomiasis in Europe. As of 2016 120 people have become infected after bathing in it.

== Geography ==
The Cavu originates at an elevation of 950 metres (3,120 ft) with what the Institut national de l'information géographique et forestière calls the creek of Sainte-Lucie, and the creek of Finicione north-east of Puntacci in the regional forest of l'Ospedale, above the community of Zonza.

In its 21.9 kilometres (13.6 mi) course it passes just south of the hamlet of Conca and of the Albarellu massif through the regional natural park of Corsica.

It generally runs from West to East. The river discharges into the Tyrrhenian Sea in Zonza, between the beach of Ovu Santu and the hamlet Olmucciu. The Cavu neighbours the Solenzara to the north and the Oso to the south.

== Tourism ==
The river is popular with locals and tourists alike, and people bathe in the natural pools.

== Sanitary issues ==
People who had bathed in the Cavu starting in 2011 or 2013 were found to have acquired bilharziosis, an infection with the parasite Schistosoma. The French government screened exposed people and by March 2015 reported that 110 French residents acquired the urogenital form of schistosomiasis. These were the first autochthonous Schistosoma infections acquired in Europe since 1965. Of 43 exposed Italian tourists, Italian scientists later found two to be infected per ELISA testing. As of 2016 more than 120 local people or tourists were known to have been infected. A French epidemiological study surveyed the Bulinus truncatus snails of the Cavu, which can harbor the parasite, and did not find any infected with the Schistosoma haematobium, Schistosoma bovis, and S. haematobium–S. bovis hybrids which had been isolated from people with the infection, thus making the environment an unlikely reservoir.

Public Health England issued a travel warning in 2014. In July 2015, the European Centre for Disease Prevention and Control declared the risk of transmission to be low.

As of 2016, transmission appears to be ongoing though, as a case acquired during the summer of 2015 has been reported; The most recent and most likely hypothesis of infection is that people who became infected in the Cavu in 2013 re-seeded the river by urinating in it.

== See also ==
- List of rivers of France
