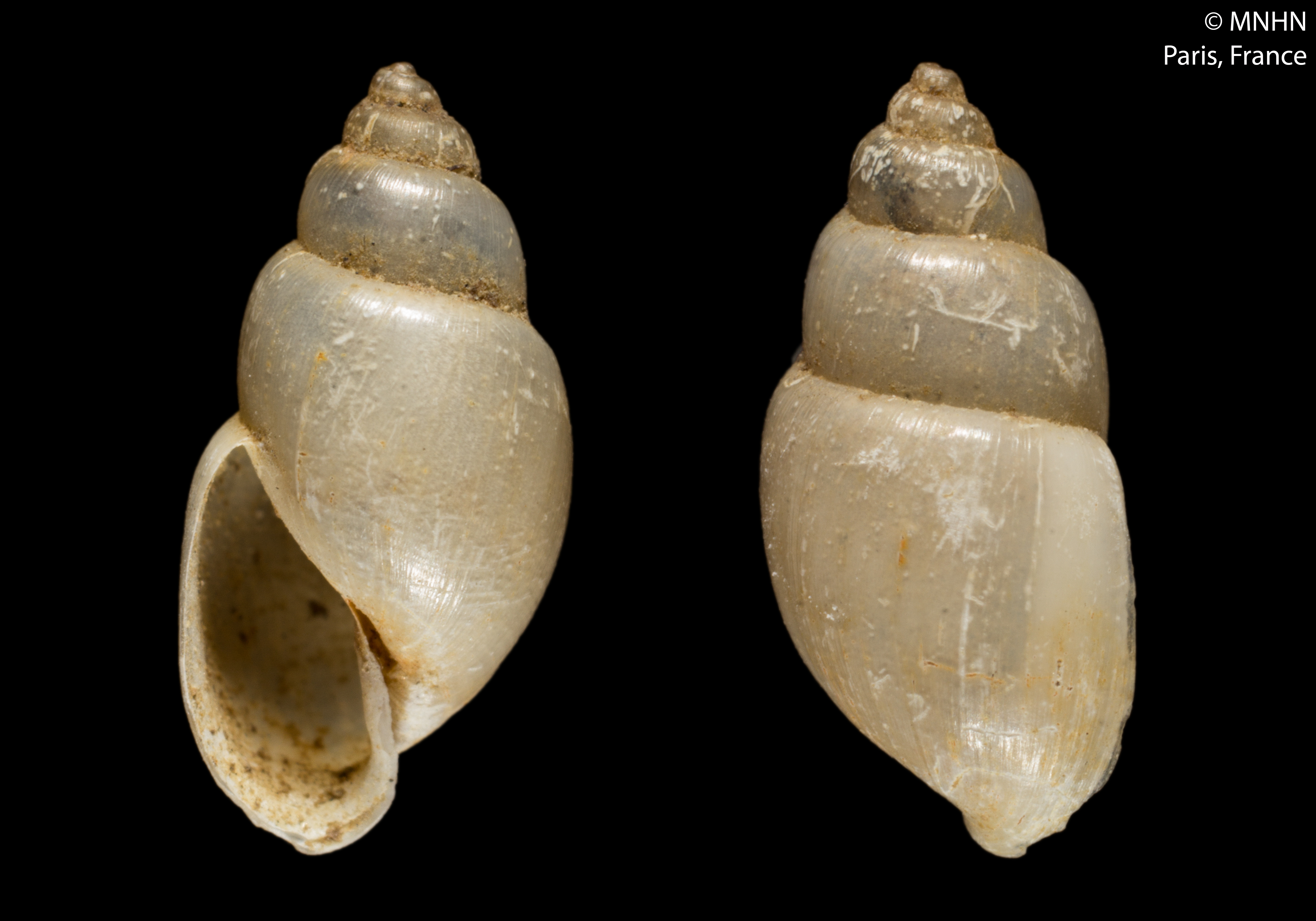
- Shell of Bulinus canescens (syntype at MNHN, Paris)

Conservation status
- Least Concern (IUCN 3.1)

Scientific classification
- Kingdom: Animalia
- Phylum: Mollusca
- Class: Gastropoda
- Superorder: Hygrophila
- Family: Bulinidae
- Genus: Bulinus
- Species: B. canescens

Binomial name
- Bulinus canescens (Morelet, 1868)

Synonyms
- Physa canescens Morelet, 1868

= Bulinus canescens =

Species of gastropod

Bulinus canescens is a species of freshwater snail, a gastropod in the family Bulinidae.

== Distribution ==
It is found in Angola, the Democratic Republic of the Congo, and Zambia.
