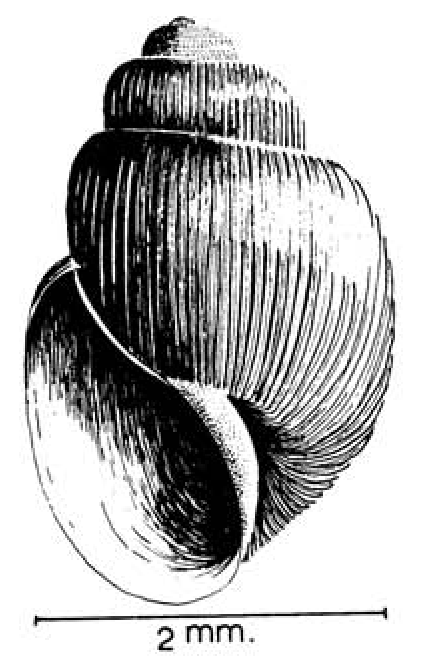
- Drawing of apertural view of the shell of Bulinus reticulatus

Conservation status
- Least Concern (IUCN 3.1)

Scientific classification
- Kingdom: Animalia
- Phylum: Mollusca
- Class: Gastropoda
- Superorder: Hygrophila
- Family: Bulinidae
- Genus: Bulinus
- Species: B. reticulatus

Binomial name
- Bulinus reticulatus Mandahl-Barth, 1954

= Bulinus reticulatus =

Species of gastropod

Bulinus reticulatus is a species group of a tropical freshwater snail with a sinistral shell, an aquatic gastropod mollusk in the family Planorbidae, the ramshorn snails and their allies.
