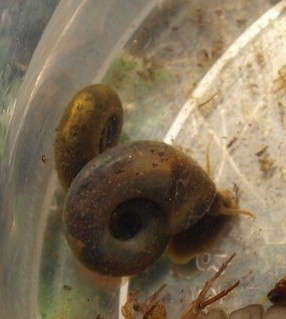

Scientific classification
- Kingdom: Animalia
- Phylum: Mollusca
- Class: Gastropoda
- Superorder: Hygrophila
- Family: Planorbidae
- Subfamily: Planorbinae
- Tribe: Coretini
- Genus: Planorbarius
- Species: P. metidjensis

Binomial name
- Planorbarius metidjensis (Forbes, 1838)
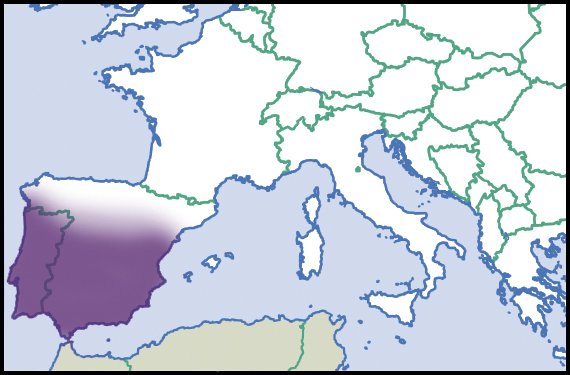
- European range according to Francisco Welter-Schultes (2012)

Synonyms
- Planorbarius (Deserticoretus) metidjensis (Forbes, 1838); Planorbarius dufourii (Graells, 1846); Planorbis dufourii Graells, 1846; Planorbis metidjensis Forbes, 1838

= Planorbarius metidjensis =

Species of gastropod

Planorbarius metidjensis is a species of freshwater lung snail.

Experiments confirmed it to be a host of Schistosoma parasites, although the freshwater snail Bulinus truncatus has been known much longer as a carrier of schistosomiasis.

== Description ==
The snail measures 8 mm (0.31 in) by 16 to 18 mm (0.63 to 0.71 in). The shell is light yellowish, while the periostracum is brown, reddish or greenish. The body is nearly black with a grey foot and tentacles.

== Schistosomiasis transmission ==
While P. metidjensis has been successfully infected with Schistosoma haematobium in the laboratory, in Morocco, no free-living infected snails have been found during a survey. Likewise, in the laboratory, snail specimens from Portugal and Salamanca were found to be very susceptible to infections by Schistosoma bovis strains gathered from the Salamanca region, but the 1977 study urged a prevalence survey of free-living snails.

In some areas, there are S. haematobium/S. bovis hybrids. P. metidjensis is immune to experimental infection with hybrid parasites collected in Corsica that contain 23% genetical material from S. bovis.

== Distribution and habitat ==
The snail occurs in southwestern Morocco as well as in Algarve (Portugal) and Salamanca (Spain).

In a 2007 study carried out in Morocco, the snail was found in larger altitudes, and not in man-made water bodies like canals and artificial lakes. It tolerated a wide range of electrical conductivities (120 to 3650 microsieverts/cm) and up to 1.1 grams of chlorides per liter. It was often found together with Ancylus fluviatilis river snails.
