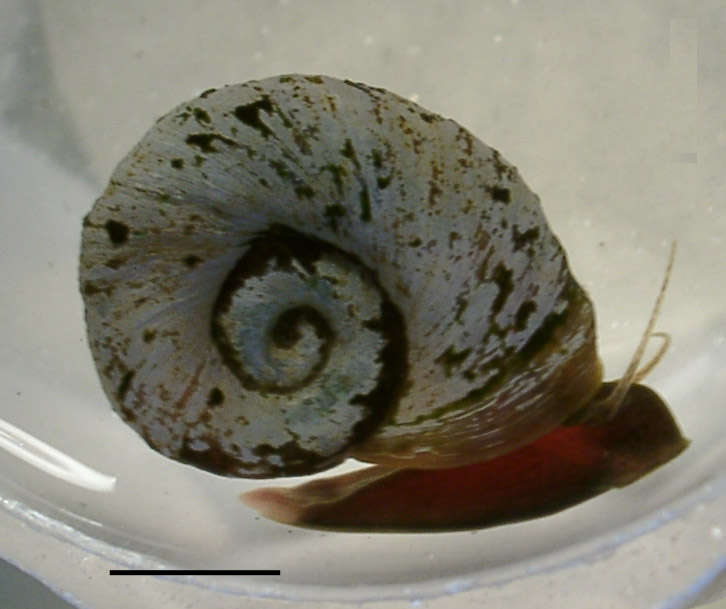
- Indoplanorbis exustus

Scientific classification
- Kingdom: Animalia
- Phylum: Mollusca
- Class: Gastropoda
- Superorder: Hygrophila
- Family: Bulinidae
- Subfamily: Bulininae
- Genus: Indoplanorbis; Annandale & Prashad, 1921

Species
- †Indoplanorbis bartheli Falkner, 1981; Indoplanorbis exustus (Deshayes, 1833)

Synonyms
- Planorbis (Indoplanorbis) Annandale & Prashad, 1921

= Indoplanorbis =

Genus of gastropods

Indoplanorbis is a genus of air-breathing freshwater snails. They are aquatic pulmonate gastropod molluscs in the ram's horn snails family Bulinidae. The only extant species is widely distributed across the tropics and serves as an important intermediate host for several trematode parasites. The invasive nature and ecological tolerance of Indoplanorbis exustus add to its importance in veterinary and medical science.

== Taxonomy ==
The genus Indoplanorbis has one extant and one extinct fossil species. It has a long history and wide geographical range, and is thought to have still additional species. Phylogeographic research revealed the phylogenetic depth of divergences between the Indian clades and Southeast Asian clades, and together with habitat and parasitological differences suggests that Indoplanorbis may comprise more than one extant species.

The most phylogenetically related genus to Indoplanorbis is genus Bulinus.

=== Biogeography ===
Meier-Brook (1984) adopted an African (Gondwanan) origin for Indoplanorbis with rafting to Asia since the Cretaceous on the northward migrating Indian craton; this author also considered a Europe to Southwest Asia tract or an Africa to South India dispersal. Morgan et al. (2002) attributed the occurrence of Indoplanorbis in India to colonization (from Africa) via the Middle East land connection. Clearly the two different dispersal mechanisms imply very different chronologies; the Gondwanan vicariance hypothesis implies that proto-Indoplanorbis has been present in India since the late Eocene (35 Ma; India: Asia collision), whereas dispersal via the Sinai-Levant suggests a Plio-Pleistocene arrival. The results by Liu et al. (2010) indicated a radiation beginning in the late Miocene with a divergence of an ancestral bulinine lineage into Assam and peninsular India clades. A Southeast Asian clade diverged from the peninsular India clade late-Pliocene; this clade then radiated at a much more rapid pace to colonize all of the sampled range of Indoplanorbis in the mid-Pleistocene.

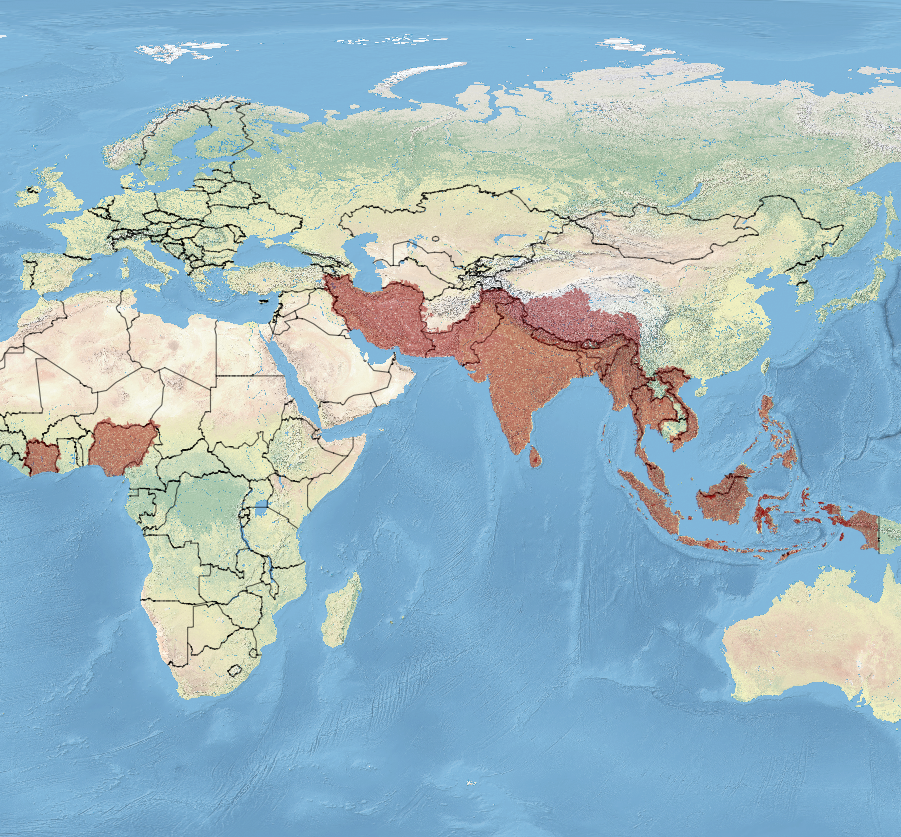
Distribution map of Indoplanorbis exustus

== Distribution ==
The present range is across Iran, Nepal, India, Sri Lanka, Southeast Asia (for example Thailand), central Asia (Afghanistan), Arabia and Africa.

The genus is also found in the Middle East (Oman and Socotra) and Nigeria and the Ivory Coast; this is attributed to recent introductions by human activities. In contrast to Asia, the well documented appearance of the snail in Africa (e.g., Nigeria and Ivory Coast) and more recently (2002) in the Lesser Antilles, is almost certainly the result of introductions through human activities over the last 50–100 years.
