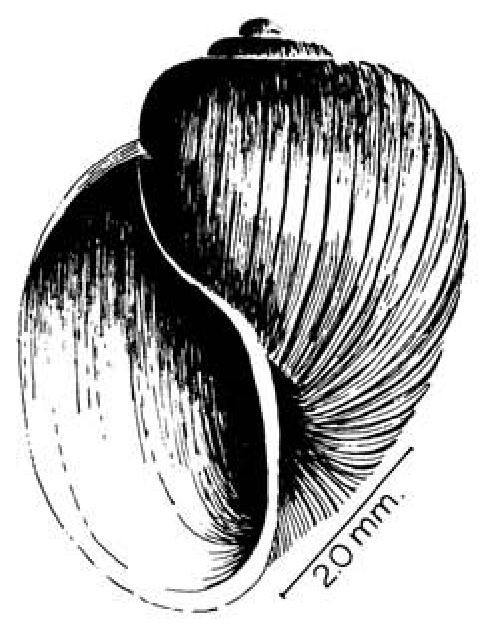
- Drawing of apertural view of the shell of Bulinus tropicus

Conservation status
- Least Concern (IUCN 3.1)

Scientific classification
- Domain: Eukaryota
- Kingdom: Animalia
- Phylum: Mollusca
- Class: Gastropoda
- Superorder: Hygrophila
- Family: Planorbidae
- Genus: Bulinus
- Species: B. tropicus

Binomial name
- Bulinus tropicus (Krauss, 1848)

Synonyms
- Bulinus corneus (Morelet, 1889) (junior synonym); Bulinus diaphanus (F. Krauss, 1848); Bulinus parietalis (Mousson, 1887) (probable synonym); Isidora compta Melvill & Ponsonby, 1903; Physa alluaudi Dautzenberg, 1908 (junior synonym); Physa cornea Morelet, 1889 (junior synonym); Physa craveni Ancey, 1886; Physa cyrtonota Bourguignat, 1856 (junior synonym); Physa diaphana F. Krauss, 1848 (synonym); Physa lirata Craven, 1881 (junior primary homonym of Physa lirata Tristram, 1863: Physa craveni Ancey, 1886 is a replacement name.); Physa rumrutiensis Preston, 1913 (junior synonym); Physa syngenes Preston, 1913; Physa tropica Krauss, 1848

= Bulinus tropicus =

Species of gastropod

Bulinus tropicus is a species of a tropical freshwater snail with a sinistral shell, an aquatic gastropod mollusk in the family Bulinidae, the ramshorn snails and their allies.

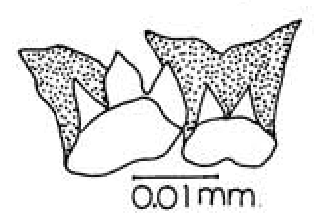
Drawing of radular teeth of Bulinus tropicus.

== Distribution ==
Distribution of Bulinus tropicus includes:

- Namibia
- ...
