= Bulinus barthi =

Conservation status
- Data Deficient (IUCN 3.1)

Scientific classification
- Kingdom: Animalia
- Phylum: Mollusca
- Class: Gastropoda
- Superorder: Hygrophila
- Family: Bulinidae
- Genus: Bulinus
- Species: B. barthi

Binomial name
- Bulinus barthi Jelnes, 1979

Species of gastropod

Bulinus barthi is a species of small tropical freshwater snail with a sinistral shell, an aquatic gastropod mollusc in the family Planorbidae, the ramshorn snails and their allies.

This species is found in Kenya and Tanzania; its natural habitat is swamps.
