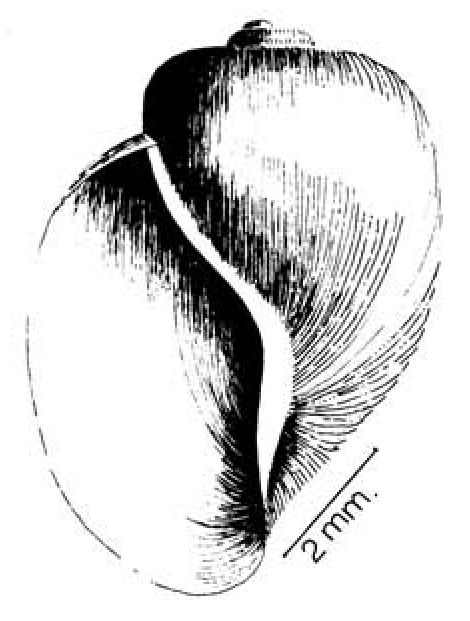
- Drawing of apertural view of the shell of Bulinus natalensis

Conservation status
- Least Concern (IUCN 3.1)

Scientific classification
- Domain: Eukaryota
- Kingdom: Animalia
- Phylum: Mollusca
- Class: Gastropoda
- Superorder: Hygrophila
- Family: Planorbidae
- Genus: Bulinus
- Species: B. natalensis

Binomial name
- Bulinus natalensis (Küster, 1841)

Synonyms
- Physa natalensis Küster, 1841

= Bulinus natalensis =

Species of gastropod

Bulinus natalensis is a species of a tropical freshwater snail with a sinistral shell, an aquatic gastropod mollusk in the family Planorbidae, the ramshorn snails and their allies. Its geographical distribution is largely limited to Kwazulu-Natal in South Africa. This species occurs in standing, perennial freshwater habitat and has the ability to aestivate for up to six months during a drought.

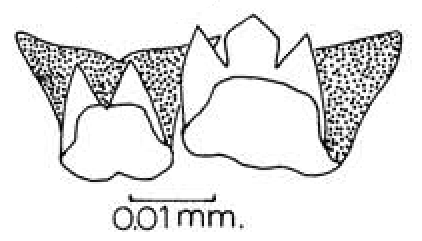
Drawing of radular teeth of Bulinus natalensis
