= Plesiophysa =

Scientific classification
- Kingdom: Animalia
- Phylum: Mollusca
- Class: Gastropoda
- Superorder: Hygrophila
- Family: Bulinidae
- Genus: Plesiophysa; Fischer, 1883

Genus of gastropods

Plesiophysa is a genus of gastropods in the family Bulinidae.

== Species ==
- Plesiophysa dolichomastix Paraense, 2002
- Plesiophysa granulata (Sowerby, 1873)
- Plesiophysa guadeloupensis Mazé, 1883
- Plesiophysa hubendicki Richards & Ferguson, 1962
- Plesiophysa pilsbryi Aguayo, 1935
