= Bulinus nyassanus =

Conservation status
- Least Concern (IUCN 3.1)

Scientific classification
- Kingdom: Animalia
- Phylum: Mollusca
- Class: Gastropoda
- Superorder: Hygrophila
- Family: Bulinidae
- Genus: Bulinus
- Species: B. nyassanus

Binomial name
- Bulinus nyassanus (E. A. Smith, 1877)

Synonyms
- Physa nyassana E. A. Smith, 1877

Species of gastropod

Bulinus nyassanus is a species of small air-breathing freshwater snail with a sinistral shell, an aquatic pulmonate gastropod mollusk in the family Planorbidae, the ramshorn snails and their allies. This species is endemic to Lake Malawi in Africa, where found both in shallow and relatively deep water. Its shell generally reached a size of up to around 14 mm × 11 mm (0.55 in × 0.43 in).

This detritus-feeder typically burrows slightly into the sediment, no more than 2 cm (0.8 in), unlike some of its relatives like B. globosus, which usually live on rocks or aquatic vegetation. Although only a minority of these snails are infected (generally 2% or less in B. nyassanus), they do play an important role in the spread of bilharzia (schistosomiasis), a parasite that causes "snail fewer" in humans. The snail-eating cichlid fish Trematocranus placodon has a preference for B. nyassanus.
