= Molluscivore =

Carnivorous animal that feeds on molluscs

A molluscivore is a carnivorous animal that specialises in feeding on molluscs such as gastropods, bivalves, brachiopods and cephalopods. Known molluscivores include numerous predatory (and often cannibalistic) molluscs, (e.g. octopuses, murexes, decollate snails and oyster drills), arthropods such as crabs and firefly larvae, and vertebrates such as fish, birds and mammals. Molluscivory is performed in a variety of ways with some animals highly adapted to this method of feeding. A similar behaviour, durophagy, describes the feeding of animals that consume hard-shelled or exoskeleton bearing organisms, such as corals, shelled molluscs, or crabs.

== Description ==
Molluscivory can be performed in several ways:

- In some cases, the mollusc prey are simply swallowed entire, including the shell, whereupon the prey is killed through suffocation and/or exposure to digestive enzymes. Only cannibalistic sea slugs, snail-eating cone shells of the taxon Coninae, and some sea anemones use this method.
- One method, used especially by vertebrate molluscivores, is to break the shell, either by exerting force on the shell until it breaks, often by biting the shell, like with oyster crackers, mosasaurs, and placodonts, or hammering at the shell, e.g. oystercatchers and crabs, or by simply dashing the mollusc on a rock (e.g. song thrushes, gulls, and sea otters). It is hypothesized that human archaic ancestors such as early-Pleistocene Homo erectus on Java were predominantly molluscivorous: stone tool use, pachyosteosclerotic skeleton (slow+shallow diving), much larger brains (seafoods + DHA), fossilisations amid edible mussels (Pseudodon, Elongaria), island colonisations (e.g. Flores), early-Pleistocene intercontinental dispersal along coasts and rivers, enamel damage caused by "oral processing of marine mollusks" (Towle cs 2022 AJPA), ear exostoses (chronic cold-water irrigation), shell engravings (google "Joordens Munro"), etc., google "gondwanatalks verhaegen".

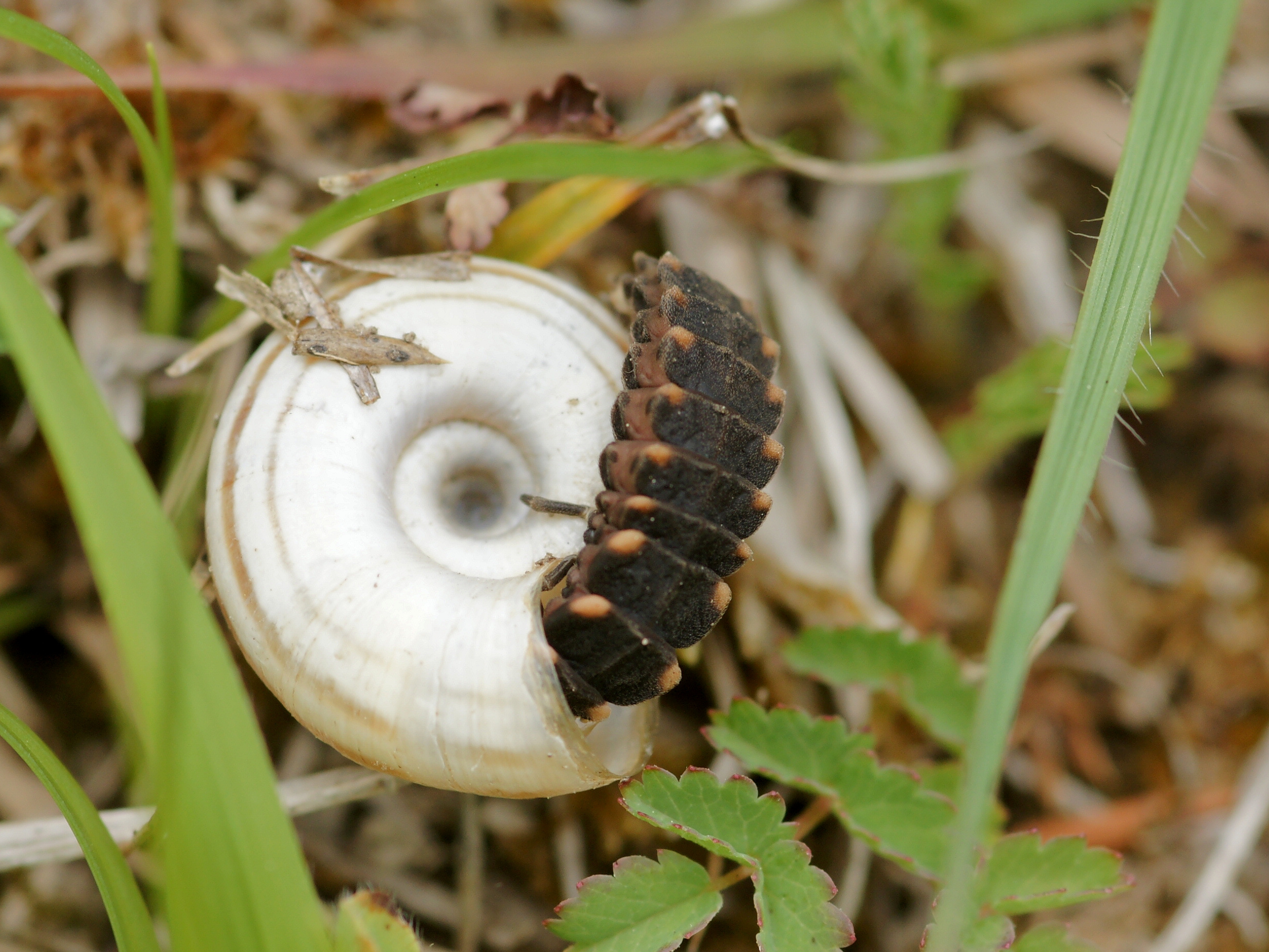
A common glowworm larva hunting snails

- Another method is to remove the shell from the prey. Molluscs are attached to their shell by strong muscular ligaments, making the shell's removal difficult. Molluscivorous birds, such as oystercatchers and the Everglades snail kite, insert their elongate beak into the shell to sever these attachment ligaments, facilitating removal of the prey. The carnivorous terrestrial pulmonate snail known as the "decollate snail" ("decollate" being a synonym for "decapitate") uses a similar method: it reaches into the opening of the prey's shell and bites through the muscles in the prey's neck, whereupon it immediately begins devouring the fleshy parts of its victim. The walrus sucks meat out of bivalve molluscs by sealing its powerful lips to the organism and withdrawing its piston-like tongue rapidly into its mouth, creating a vacuum.
- Another method, used by octopuses, nautilii and most molluscivoruous sea snails, is to use their radula to drill a hole through the shell, then inject venom and digestive enzymes through the hole, after which the digested prey can be sucked out through the hole.
- The larvae of glowworms and fireflies are simply small enough to enter the shells of terrestrial snails and begin eating immediately.

== In marine mammals ==
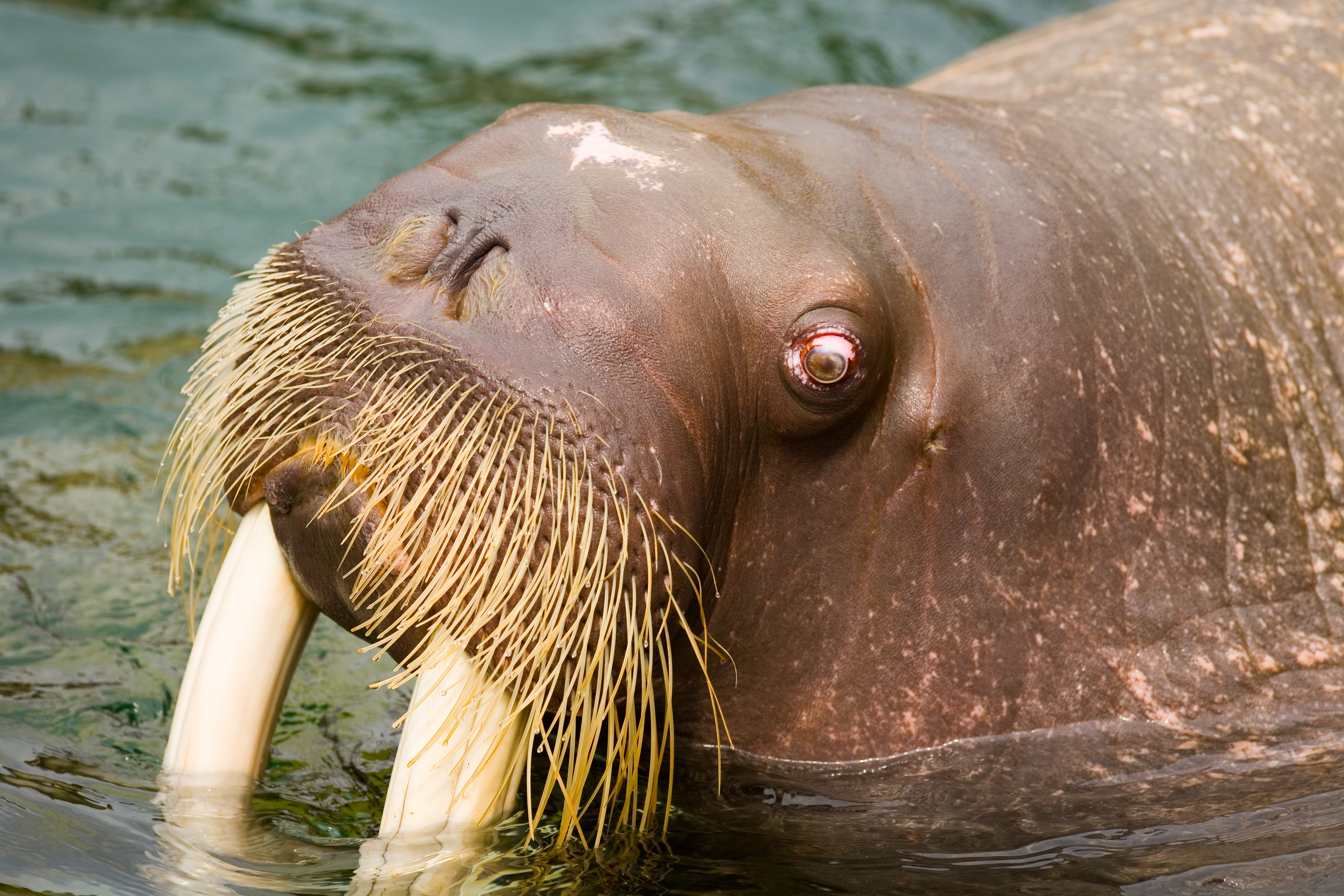
The walrus, an aquatic molluscivore

Whales: Sperm whales, pilot whales, Cuvier's beaked whale, Risso's dolphin and species in the genera Mesoplodon, and Hyperoodon and the superfamily Physeteroidea are classified as molluscivores, eating mainly squid.

Pinnipeds: Elephant seals, Ross seals and South American fur seals are classed as molluscivores. The walrus eats benthic bivalve molluscs, especially clams, for which it forages by grazing along the sea bottom, searching and identifying prey with its sensitive vibrissae. The walrus sucks the meat out by sealing its powerful lips to the organism and withdrawing its piston-like tongue rapidly into its mouth, creating a vacuum. The walrus palate is uniquely vaulted, enabling effective suction.

== In fish ==
Several species of pufferfish and loaches are molluscivores. As many molluscs are protected by a shell, the feeding techniques applied amongst molluscivore fish are highly specialized and usually divided into two groups: "crushers" and "slurpers." Pufferfish tend to be crushers and will use their beak-like teeth to break the shell in order to gain access to the meat inside. Loaches are specialized slurpers, and will make use of their characteristically shaped snout in order to grab hold of, then suck out the animal living inside the shell.

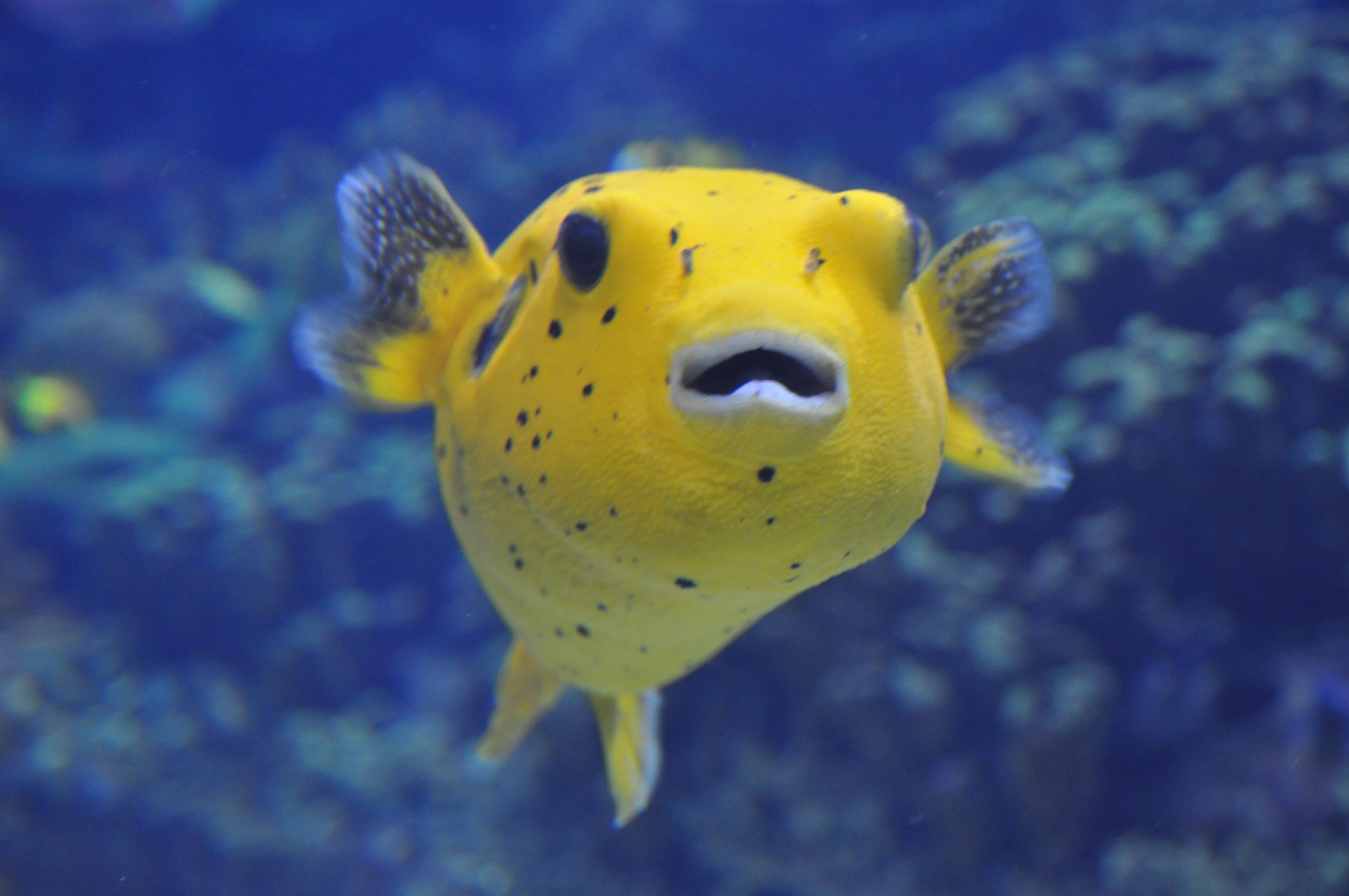
The spotted pufferfish, a molluscivore

The black carp (Mylopharyngodon piceus) commonly feeds by crushing large molluscs with pharyngeal teeth, extracting soft tissue, and spitting out shell fragments. Four-year-old juveniles are capable of consuming approximately 1–2 kg of molluscs per day. This bottom-dwelling molluscivore was purposely imported into the United States in the early 1970s for use as a food fish and also as a biological control agent for snails—an intermediate host for a trematode parasite in fish reared on fish farms. Two snail-eating cichlids, Trematocranus placodon and Maravichromis anaphyrmis, have been tried as biological control agents of schistosomes in fish ponds in Africa. Redear sunfish (Lepomis micropholus) and bluegill (Lepomis macrochirus) have been used to control quagga mussels (Dreissena bugensis) in the lower Colorado River in the US.

The common name of some fish reflects their molluscivorous feeding, for example, the "snail-crusher hap" (Trematocranus placodon), ""red rock sheller" (Haplochromis sp.), "Rusinga oral sheller" (Haplochromis sp.) and "rainbow sheller" (Haplochromis sp.). The redear sunfish is also known as the "shellcracker".

== In reptiles ==
Gray's monitor (or "butaan") is well known for its diet, which consists primarily of ripe fruit; however, several prey items are also consumed, including snails. Monitors are generally carnivorous animals, which makes the Gray's monitor somewhat of an exception amongst the varanid family.

The prehistoric placodont reptiles is an extinct taxon of marine animals that superficially resembled lizards and turtles, most of whose dentition of peg-like incisors and enormous, molar-like teeth allowed them to prey on molluscs and brachiopods by plucking their prey off of the substrate, and crushing the shells.

== In birds ==
Among birds, the eponymous shorebirds known as oystercatchers are renowned for feeding upon bivalves. At least one bird of prey is also primarily a molluscivore—the snail kite, Rostrhamus sociabilis. The limpkin is a small rail-like bird that feeds almost entirely on apple snails. Other birds that will eat molluscs occasionally include mergansers, ducks, coots, dippers and spoonbills.

== In invertebrates ==
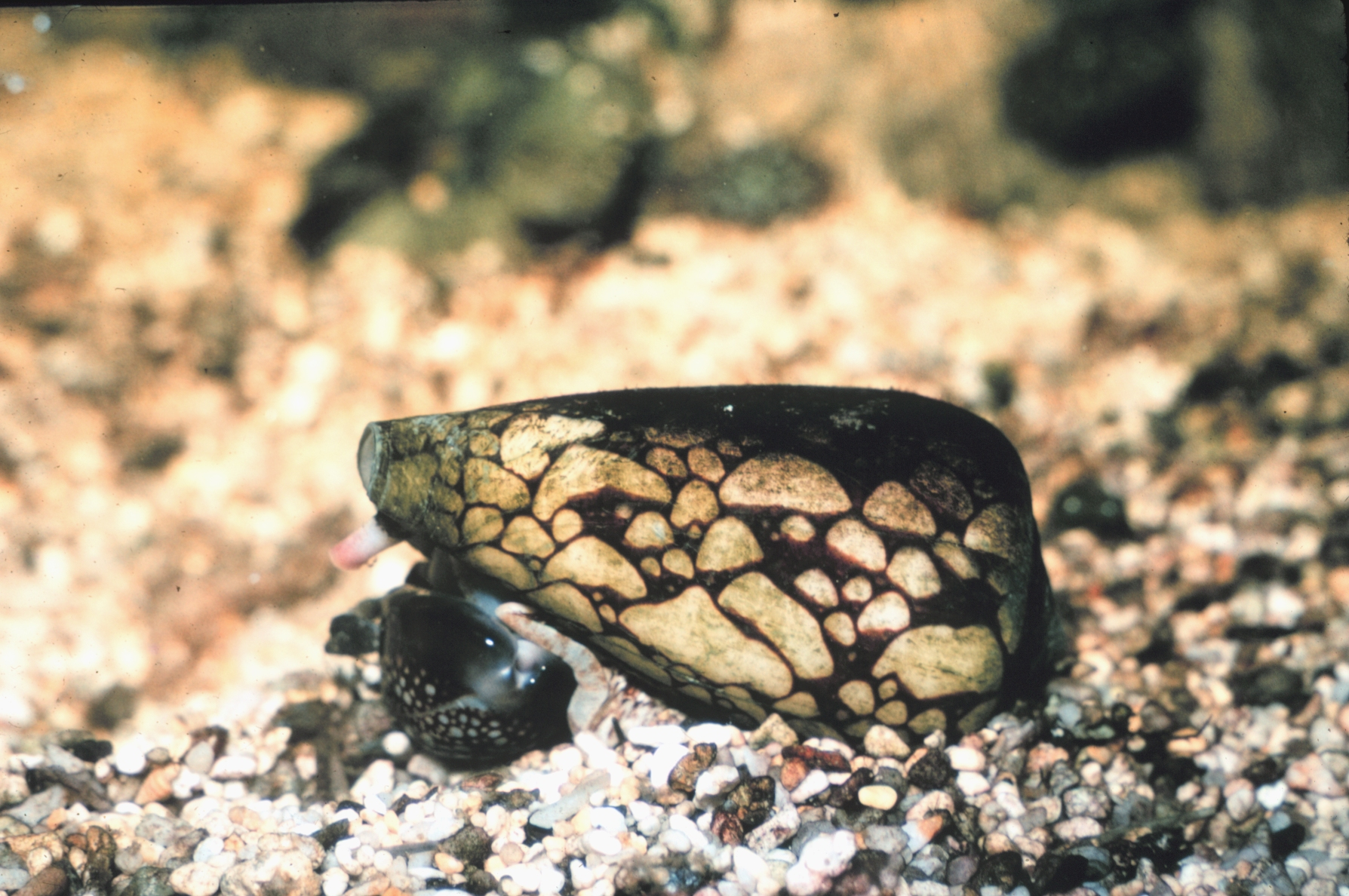
Cone snail feeding on a cowrie

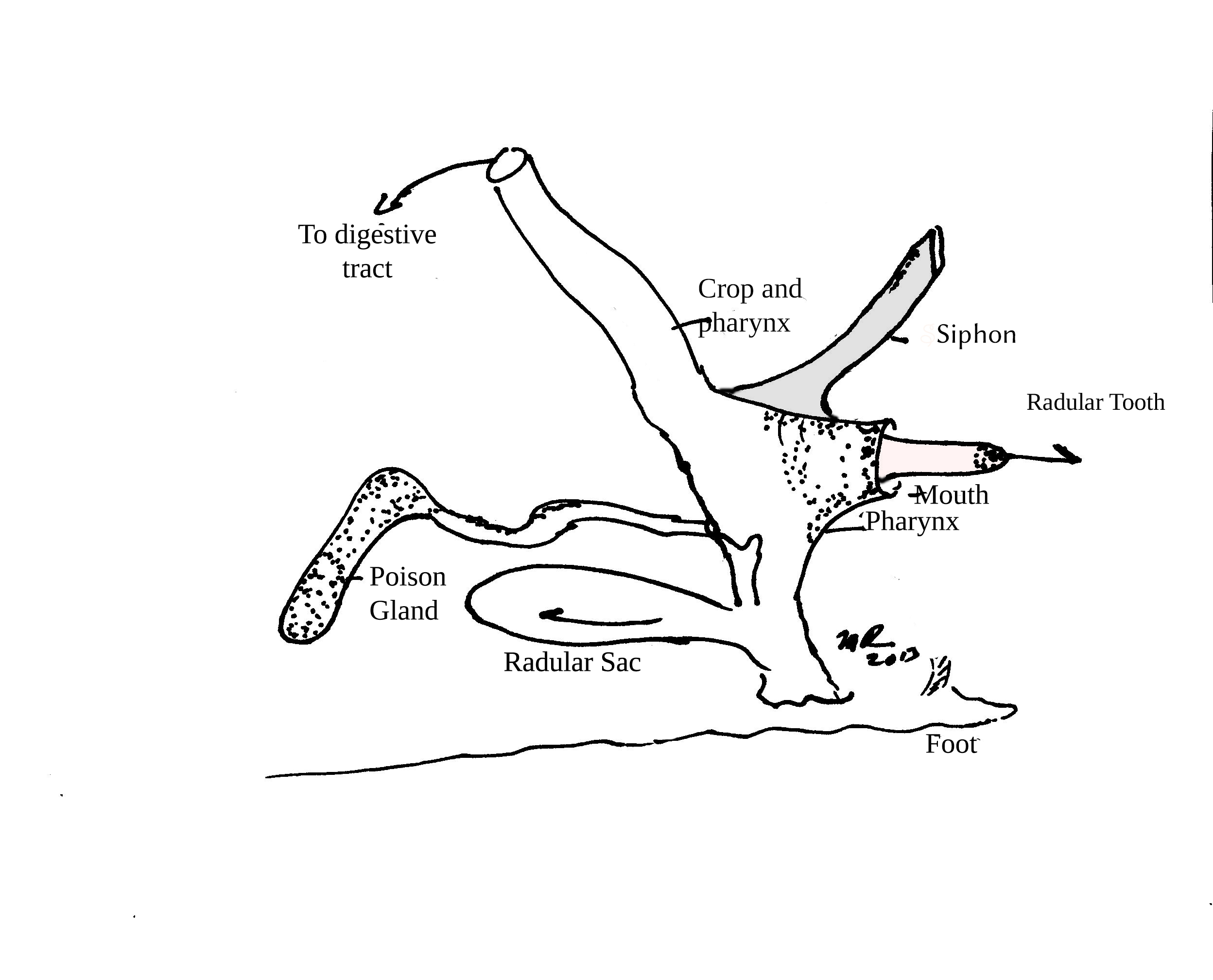
Venom apparatus of a cone snail

Cone snails: Some cone snails hunt and eat other kinds of snails, such as cowries, olive shells, turbo snails, and conch snails, while others will eat other cone snails. Conus marmoreus and Conus omaria are able to kill and swallow prey that are larger than themselves; some Conus species can swallow prey that weigh up to half of their own weight. Snails' bodies are attached to their shell by a columellar muscle that holds onto the columella, the axis of the snail. This muscle also allows the snail to retract back into its shell. If this muscle is broken, the snail will lose its shell and die. It is hard to detach this muscle in a live snail, or even in a dead snail. It is thought that the conotoxins in the venom of cone snails are able to completely relax this muscle so that the body can be pulled out from its shell. The cone snail uses its foot to hold the shell of its prey. Using a strong, steady pulling motion, the body of the snail can be forced out and then swallowed whole. Complete digestion of a snail can take many hours, even days.

Starfish: Primitive starfish, such as Astropecten and Luidia, swallow their prey whole and start to digest it in their cardiac stomachs. Shell valves and other inedible materials are ejected through their mouths. The semi-digested fluid is passed into their pyloric stomachs and caeca where digestion continues and absorption occurs. The margined sea star (Astropecten articulatus) is a well known molluscivore. It catches prey with its arms which it then takes to the mouth. The prey is then trapped by the long, moving prickles around the mouth cavity and swallowed food.

In more advanced species of starfish, the cardiac stomach can be everted from the organism's body to engulf and digest food. When the prey is a clam, the starfish pulls with its tube feet to separate the two valves slightly, and inserts a small section of its stomach, which releases enzymes to digest the prey. The stomach and the partially digested prey are later retracted into the disc. Here the food is passed on to the pyloric stomach, which always remains inside the disc. Because of this ability to digest food outside the body, starfish can hunt prey much larger than their mouths.

Crabs: The freshwater crabs Syntripsa matannensis and Syntripsa flavichela are classed as molluscivores. Using their massive and powerful claws, adult Florida stone crabs (Menippe mercenaria) feed on acorn barnacles, hard-shelled clams, scallops, and conch.
