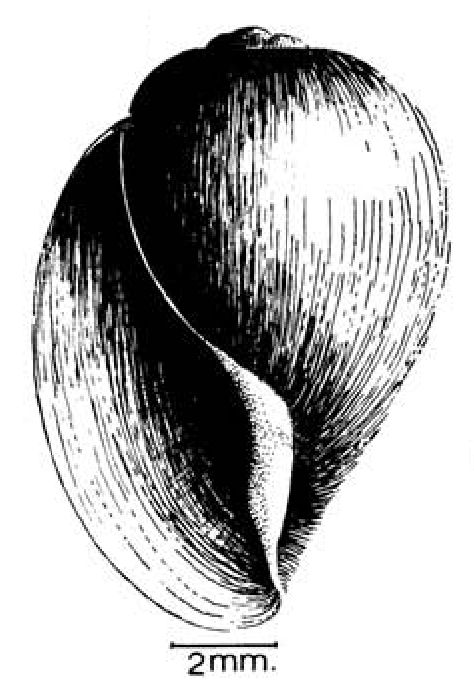
- apertural view of the shell of Bulinus globosus

Conservation status
- Least Concern (IUCN 3.1)

Scientific classification
- Kingdom: Animalia
- Phylum: Mollusca
- Class: Gastropoda
- Superorder: Hygrophila
- Family: Bulinidae
- Genus: Bulinus
- Species: B. globosus

Binomial name
- Bulinus globosus (Morelet, 1866)

Synonyms
- Physa globosus Morelet, 1866

= Bulinus globosus =

Species of gastropod

Bulinus globosus is a species of a tropical freshwater snail with a sinistral shell, an aquatic gastropod mollusk in the family Planorbidae, the ramshorn snails and their allies.

== Parasites ==
Bulinus globosus is an intermediary host of Schistosoma haematobium, along with Bulinus truncatus.
