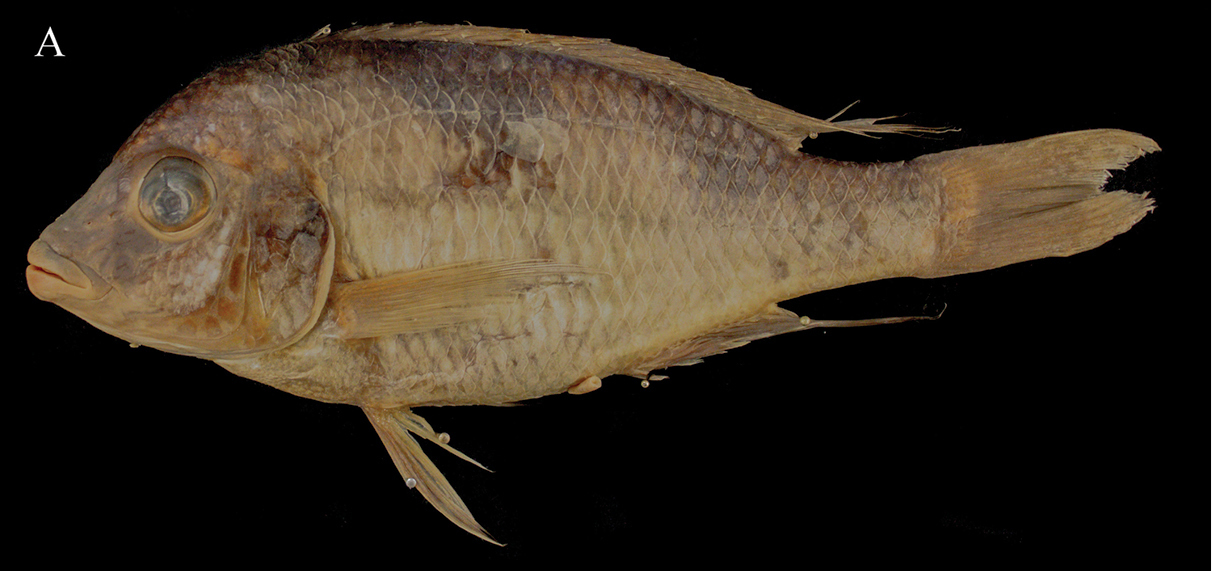

Conservation status
- Data Deficient (IUCN 3.1)

Scientific classification
- Kingdom: Animalia
- Phylum: Chordata
- Class: Actinopterygii
- Order: Cichliformes
- Family: Cichlidae
- Genus: Trematocranus
- Species: T. pachychilus

Binomial name
- Trematocranus pachychilus Dierickx, Hanssens, Rusuwa, Snoeks, 2018

= Trematocranus pachychilus =

Species of fish

Trematocranus pachychilus is a species of cichlid endemic to Lake Malawi. It is confined to Jafua Bay area of the Lake Malawi.

== Etymology ==
The species name pachychilus means thick-lip in Greek.

== Description ==
This species can reach a length of 31.5–33.8mm. Head steep, whereas body deep and laterally compressed. Snout pointed and mouth terminal. Lips very thick. Teeth slender, generally straight and slightly curved inwards. Body brownish to slightly greyish in color. Dorsum darker than belly.
