= Trematocranus labifer =

Conservation status
- Data Deficient (IUCN 3.1)

Scientific classification
- Kingdom: Animalia
- Phylum: Chordata
- Class: Actinopterygii
- Order: Cichliformes
- Family: Cichlidae
- Genus: Trematocranus
- Species: T. labifer

Binomial name
- Trematocranus labifer (Trewavas, 1935)

Synonyms
- Haplochromis labifer Trewavas, 1935; Cyrtocara labifer (Trewavas, 1935)

Species of fish

Trematocranus labifer is a species of cichlid endemic to Lake Malawi where it prefers the shallows off of sandy beaches. This species can reach a length of 22.4 centimetres (8.8 in) TL. This species can also be found in the aquarium trade.
