= Trematocranus brevirostris =

Conservation status
- Least Concern (IUCN 3.1)

Scientific classification
- Kingdom: Animalia
- Phylum: Chordata
- Class: Actinopterygii
- Order: Cichliformes
- Family: Cichlidae
- Genus: Trematocranus
- Species: T. brevirostris

Binomial name
- Trematocranus brevirostris (Trewavas,1935)

Synonyms
- Aulonocara brevirostre (Trewavas, 1935)

Species of fish

Trematocranus brevirostris is a species of haplochromine cichlid which is endemic to Lake Malawi. It is found along the eastern shore of the Lake in Malawi, Mozambique and Tanzania. It is common at depths of 19–40 metres (62–131 ft), it has been found to feed on small invertebrates. algae and detritus.
