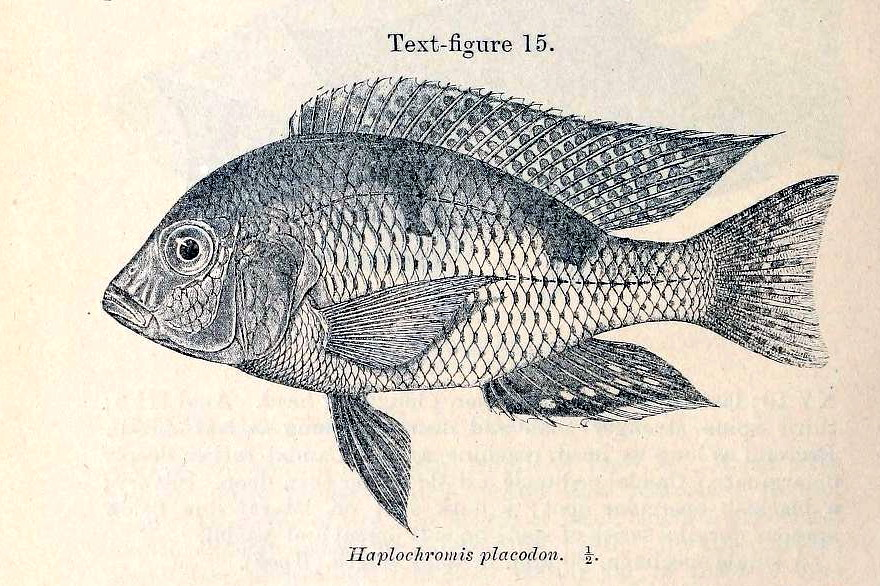
- Trematocranus placodon

Scientific classification
- Kingdom: Animalia
- Phylum: Chordata
- Class: Actinopterygii
- Order: Cichliformes
- Family: Cichlidae
- Tribe: Haplochromini
- Genus: Trematocranus; Trewavas, 1935

Type species
- Trematocranus microstoma Trewavas, 1935

= Trematocranus =

Genus of fishes

Trematocranus is a small genus of haplochromine cichlids endemic to Lake Malawi.

== Species ==
There are currently four recognized species in this genus, with a new species described in 2018.

- Trematocranus brevirostris Trewavas, 1935 (Incertae sedis)
- Trematocranus labifer (Trewavas, 1935)
- Trematocranus microstoma Trewavas, 1935 (Pointedhead Haplo)
- Trematocranus pachychilus Dierickx, Hanssens, Rusuwa, Snoeks, 2018
- Trematocranus placodon (Regan, 1922)
