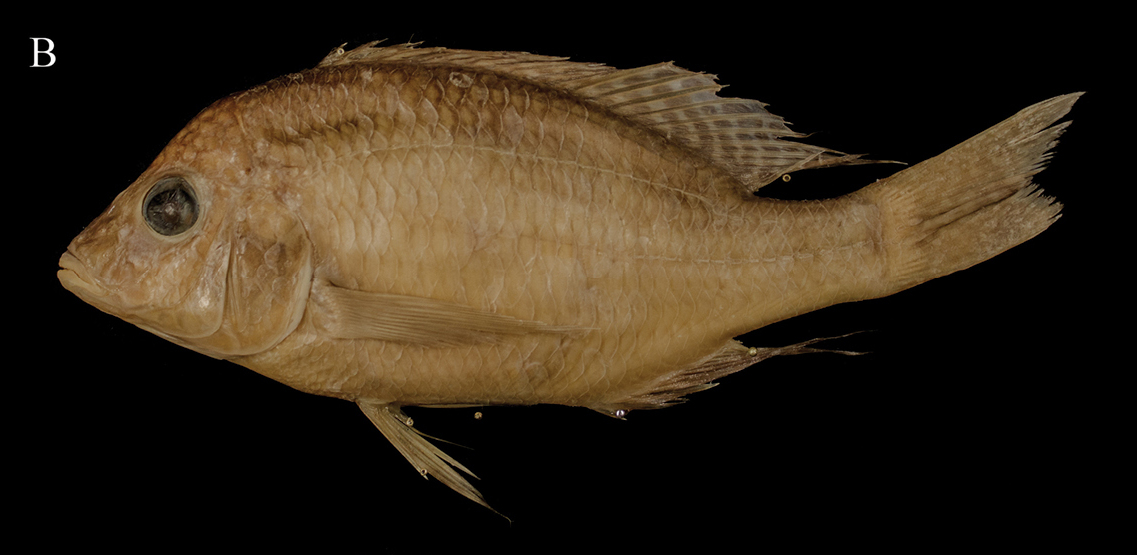

Conservation status
- Endangered (IUCN 3.1)

Scientific classification
- Kingdom: Animalia
- Phylum: Chordata
- Class: Actinopterygii
- Order: Cichliformes
- Family: Cichlidae
- Genus: Trematocranus
- Species: T. microstoma

Binomial name
- Trematocranus microstoma Trewavas, 1935

Synonyms
- Aulonocara microstoma (Trewavas, 1935); Trematochromis microstoma (Trewavas, 1935)

= Trematocranus microstoma =

Species of fish

Trematocranus microstoma, known in the aquarium trade as the "Haplochromis placodon pointed head" is a species of cichlid endemic to Lake Malawi where it is found in shallow waters close to shore, apparently showing a preference for areas with plentiful vegetation. This species can reach a length of 23.2 centimetres (9.1 in) TL. This species can also be found in the aquarium trade.
