= List of non-marine molluscs of Somalia =

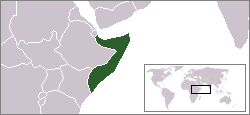
Location of Somalia

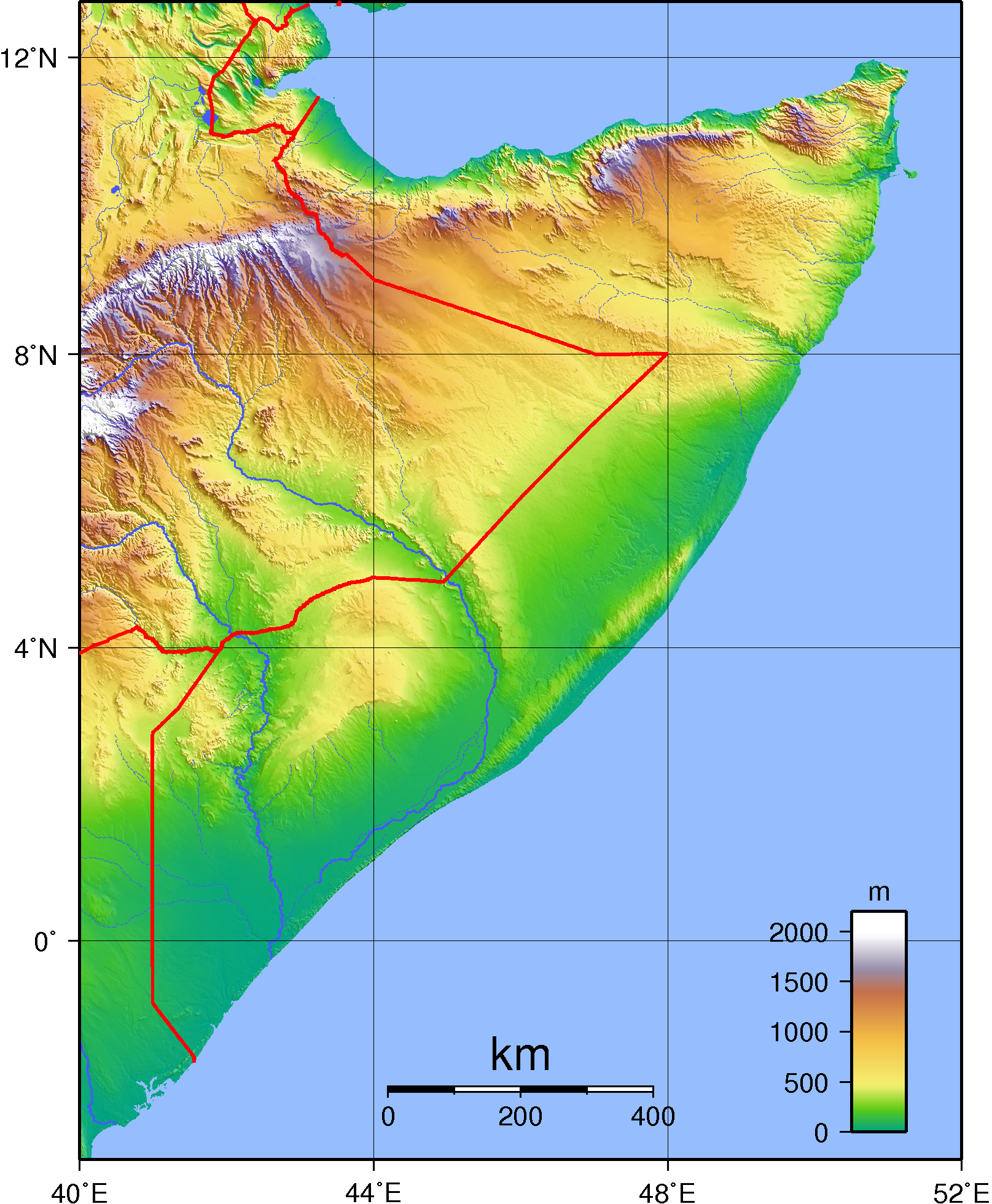
topography of Somalia

The non-marine molluscs of Somalia are a part of the molluscan fauna of Somalia (wildlife of Somalia).

A number of species of non-marine molluscs are found in the wild in Somalia.

== Freshwater gastropods ==
Freshwater gastropods in Somalia include:

Planorbidae

- Bulinus abyssinicus (von Martens, 1866)

Lymnaeidae

- Radix natalensis (Krauss, 1848)

== Land gastropods ==
Land gastropods in Somalia include:

Streptaxidae

- Somalitayloria Verdcourt, 1962 - endemic genus

== Freshwater bivalves ==
Freshwater bivalves in Somalia include:

== See also ==
- List of marine molluscs of Somalia

Lists of molluscs of surrounding countries:

- List of non-marine molluscs of Djibouti, Wildlife of Djibouti
- List of non-marine molluscs of Kenya, Wildlife of Kenya
- List of non-marine molluscs of Yemen, Wildlife of Yemen
- List of non-marine molluscs of Ethiopia, Wildlife of Ethiopia
