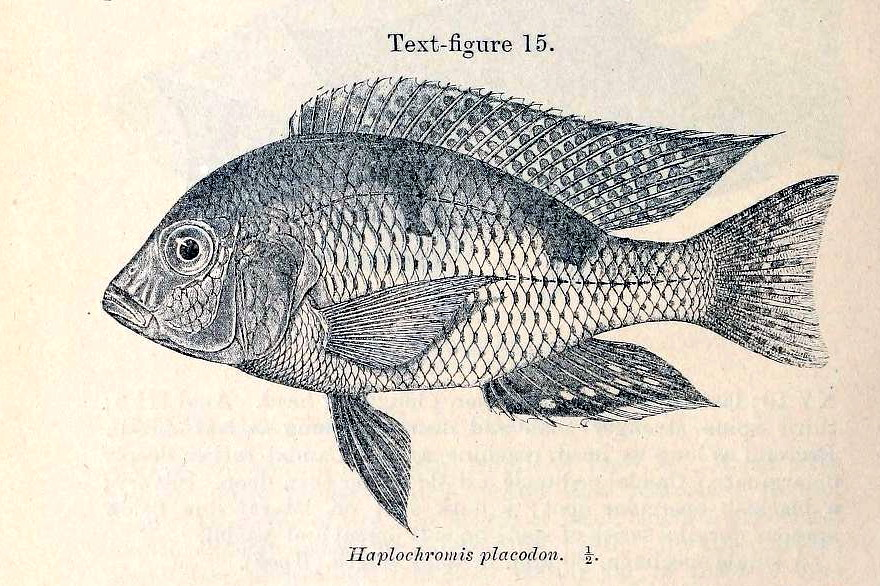

Conservation status
- Least Concern (IUCN 3.1)

Scientific classification
- Kingdom: Animalia
- Phylum: Chordata
- Class: Actinopterygii
- Order: Cichliformes
- Family: Cichlidae
- Genus: Trematocranus
- Species: T. placodon

Binomial name
- Trematocranus placodon (Regan, 1922)

Synonyms
- Haplochromis placodon Regan, 1922; Cyrtocara placodon (Regan, 1922)

= Trematocranus placodon =

Species of fish

Trematocranus placodon is a species of cichlid fish endemic to Lake Malawi, Lake Malombe and the upper reaches of the Shire River in Africa. It is mainly a shallow-water species that prefers to occupy areas with patches of Vallisneria, but it can occur as deep as 31 m (102 ft). It can reach a total length of up to 25 cm (9.8 in).

It feeds mainly on aquatic snails and has a preference for Bulinus nyassanus, making this cichlid beneficial to humans as that snail is an intermediate host of the parasite bilharzia (schistosomiasis). It has been suggested that an increase in bilharzia in Lake Malawi has been caused by overfishing of this and other snail-eating cichlids. It is mainly caught as a food fish, but also for the aquarium trade. Although it has seriously declined in some regions, overall it remains widespread and it is considered a species of least concern by the IUCN.
