= List of non-marine molluscs of Senegal =

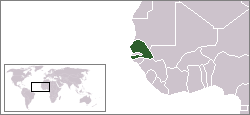
Location of Senegal

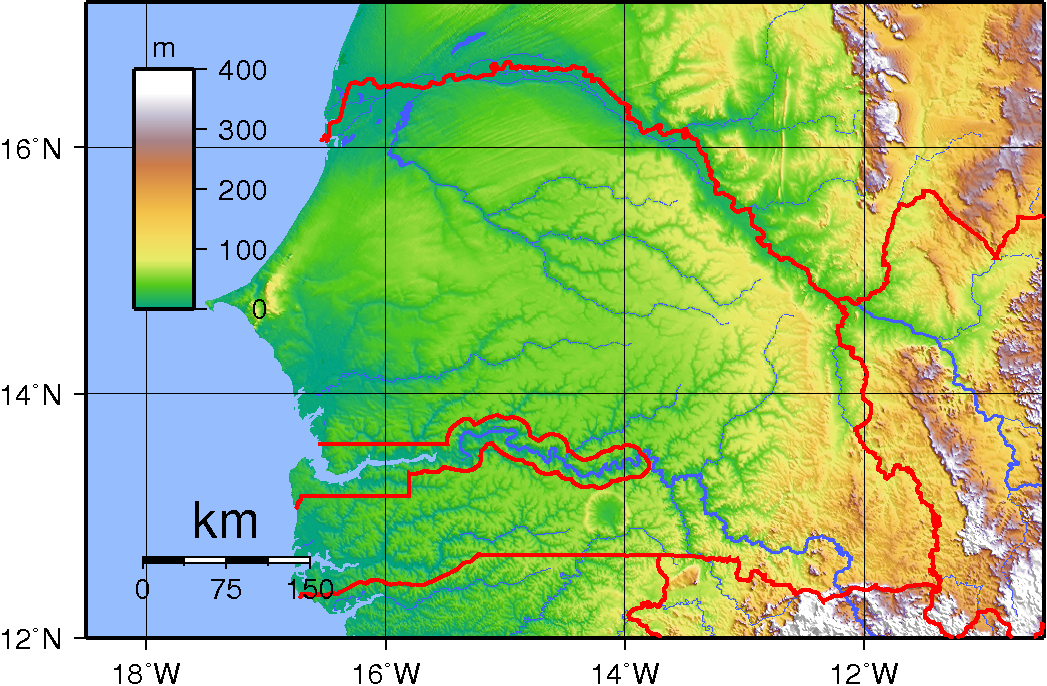
Topography of Senegal

The non-marine molluscs of Senegal are a part of the molluscan fauna of Senegal (wildlife of Senegal).

A number of species of non-marine molluscs are found in the wild in Senegal.

== Freshwater gastropods ==
Freshwater gastropods in Senegal include:

Viviparidae

- Bellamya unicolor Olivier, 1804

Cochliopidae

- Heleobia sp.

Thiaridae

- Melanoides tuberculata Müller, 1774

Planorbidae

- Biomphalaria pfeifferi (Krauss, 1848)
- Bulinus forskalii (Ehrenberg, 1831)
- Bulinus truncatus (Audouin, 1827)

Lymnaeidae

- Radix natalensis Krauss, 1848

== Land gastropods ==
Land gastropods in Senegal include:

== Freshwater bivalves ==
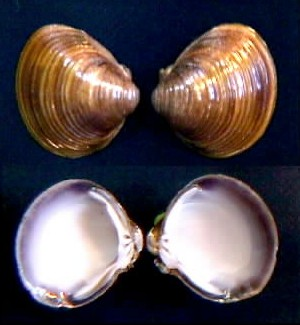
Corbicula fluminalis

Freshwater bivalves in Senegal include:

Unionidae

- Coelatura aegyptiaca (Cailliaud, 1827)

Corbiculidae

- Corbicula fluminalis (Müller 1774)

== See also ==
- List of marine molluscs of Senegal

Lists of molluscs of surrounding countries:

- List of non-marine molluscs of Mauritania, Wildlife of Mauritania
- List of non-marine molluscs of Mali, Wildlife of Mali
- List of non-marine molluscs of Guinea, Wildlife of Guinea
- List of non-marine molluscs of Guinea-Bissau, Wildlife of Guinea-Bissau
- List of non-marine molluscs of Gambia, Wildlife of Gambia
