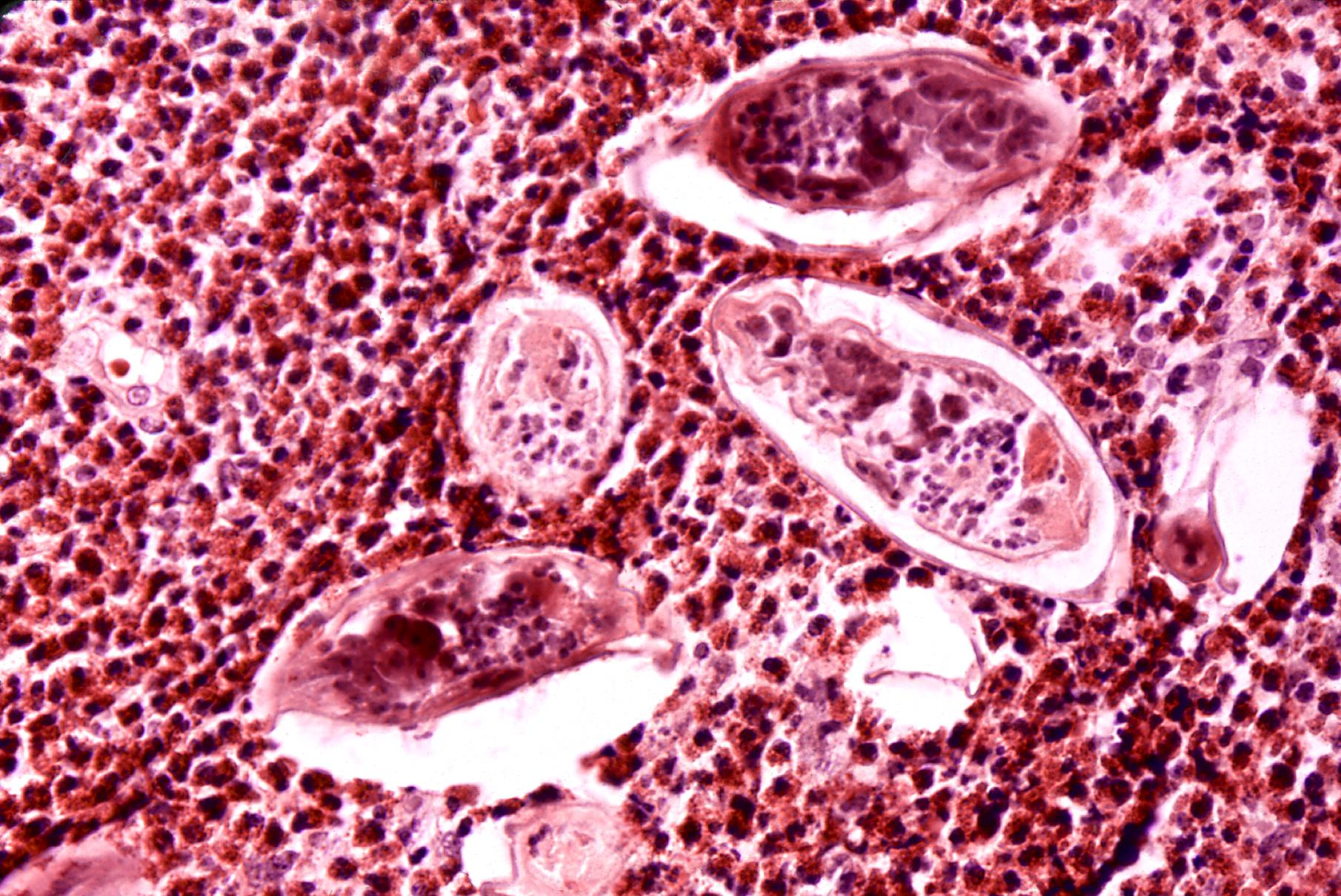
- Eggs of S. haematobium surrounded by intense infiltrates of eosinophils in bladder tissue.

Scientific classification
- Kingdom: Animalia
- Phylum: Platyhelminthes
- Class: Trematoda
- Order: Diplostomida
- Family: Schistosomatidae
- Genus: Schistosoma
- Species: S. haematobium

Binomial name
- Schistosoma haematobium (Bilharz, 1852)

= Schistosoma haematobium =

Species of fluke

Schistosoma haematobium (urinary blood fluke) is a species of digenetic trematode, belonging to a group (genus) of blood flukes (Schistosoma). It is found in Africa and the Middle East. It is the major agent of schistosomiasis, the most prevalent parasitic infection in humans. It is the only blood fluke that infects the urinary tract, causing urinary schistosomiasis, and is a leading cause of bladder cancer (only next to tobacco smoking). The diseases are caused by the eggs.

Adults are found in the venous plexuses around the urinary bladder and the released eggs travel to the wall of the urine bladder causing haematuria and fibrosis of the bladder. The bladder becomes calcified, and there is increased pressure on ureters and kidneys otherwise known as hydronephrosis. Inflammation of the genitals due to S. haematobium may contribute to the propagation of HIV.

S. haematobium was the first blood fluke discovered. Theodor Bilharz, a German surgeon working in Cairo, identified the parasite as a causative agent of urinary infection in 1851. After the discoverer, the infection (generally including all schistosome infections) was called bilharzia or bilharziasis. Along with other helminth parasites Clonorchis sinensis and Opisthorchis viverrini, S. haematobium was declared as Group 1 (extensively proven) carcinogens by the WHO International Agency for Research on Cancer (IARC) Working Group on the Evaluation of Carcinogenic Risks to Humans in 2009.

== History ==
The first scientific report of S. haematobium was by Marc Armand Ruffer, a British physician in Egypt, in 1910. He discovered parasite eggs from two mummies, which were dated to around 1250–1000 BC. The oldest infection known to date was revealed using ELISA, and is more than 5,000 years old. Since the cause of the disease was unknown, Napoleon's army in 1798 called Egypt "the land of menstruating men."

In 1851, Theodor Maximillian Bilharz, a German physician at the Kasr el-Aini Hospital in Cairo recovered the adult fluke from a dead soldier. He named it Distomum haematobium, for its apparent two mouths (now called ventral and oral suckers) and habitat of the blood vessel. He published the formal description in 1852. The genus Distomum (literally "two-mouthed") was created by Carl Linnaeus in 1758 for all flukes; hence, it was not specific. Another German physician Heinrich Meckel von Hemsbach introduced a new name Bilharzia haematobium in 1856 to honour the discoverer. He also introduced the medical term bilharzia or bilharziasis to describe the infection. Unbeknown to von Hemsbach, a German zoologist David Friedrich Weinland established a new genus Schistosoma in 1858. After almost a century of taxonomic dispute, Schistosoma was validated by ICZN in 1954; thereby validating the name Schistosoma haematobium.

The infectious nature was discovered by British physician Robert Thomson Leiper in 1915. He successfully infected mice, rats, guinea pigs, and monkey using cercariae from four species of snails, belonging to Bullinus (now Bulinus) and Planorbis, which were collected from El Marg canal near Cairo; proving that snails are the intermediate hosts.

Its role in cancer was first noted by a British Surgeon Reginald Harrison, at the Liverpool Royal Infirmary, in 1889. He recorded that four people out of five cancer patients had bilharzia. A German physician Carl Goebel confirmed in 1903 that bladder tumour occurred in most bilharzia patients. By 1905, he was convinced that carcinoma of bladder was due to bilharzia. After decades of assessing the medical reports, it was finally declared by the WHO International Agency for Research on Cancer (IARC) Working Group on the Evaluation of Carcinogenic Risks to Humans in 2009 that S. haematobium is Group 1 carcinogen.

== Structure ==
Adult Schistosoma haematobium has male and female, which are permanently paired (a condition called in copula) as what looks like an individual. The male forms the flatworm part, measuring 10–18 mm in length and 1 mm in width. It bears oral and ventral suckers towards its anterior end. Its leaf-like flat body is curled up from both sides to form a channel or groove called gynaecophoric canal in which the female is wrapped up. Thus, it gives the general appearance of a cylindrical roundworm body. Only the extreme anterior and posterior ends of the female are exposed. In contrast to the male, a female exhibits every feature of a roundworm. It is cylindrical and elongated, measuring about 20 mm in length and 0.25 mm in width. Its pathogenic armament, the eggs are oval-shaped, measuring 144 × 58 μm in diameter, with characteristic terminal spine. This is an important diagnostic tool because co-infection with S. mansoni (having a lateral-spined eggs) is common.

The miracidium measures about 136 μm long and 55 μm wide. The body is covered by anucleate epidermal plates separated by epidermal ridges. The epidermal cells give off numerous hair-like cilia on the body surface. Epidermal plate is absent only at the extreme anterior called apical papilla, or terebratorium, which contains numerous sensory organelles. Its internal body is almost fully filled with glycogen particles and vesicles.

The cercaria has a characteristic bifurcated tail, classically called furcae (Latin for fork); hence, the name (derived from a Greek word κέρκος, kerkos, meaning tail). The body is pear-shaped and measures 0.24 mm in length and 0.1 mm in width. Its tegument is fully covered with spine. A conspicuous oral sucker is at the tip of the body.

== Life cycle ==
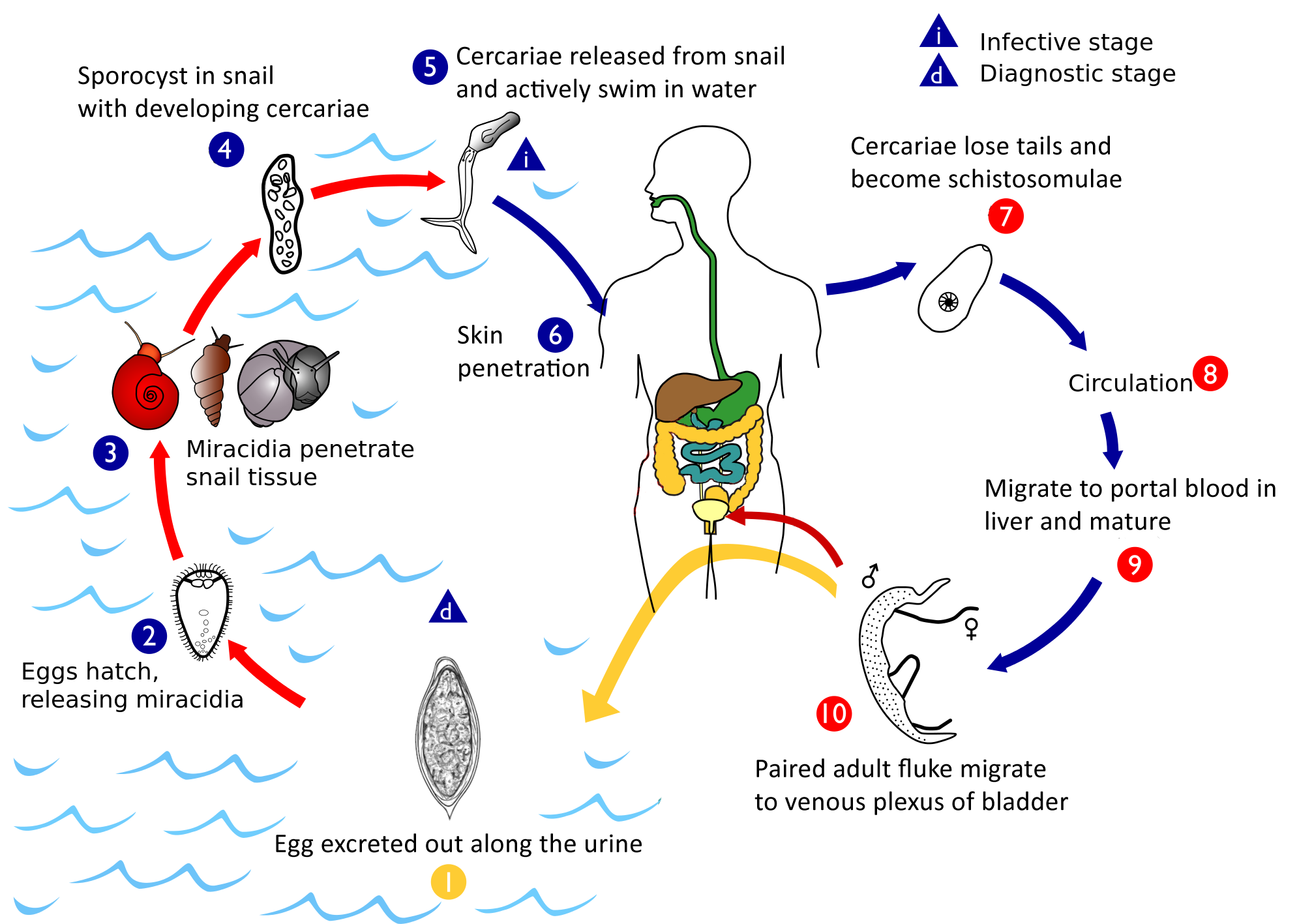
Life cycle of S. haematobium.

S. haematobium completes its life cycle in humans, as definitive hosts, and freshwater snails, as intermediate hosts, just like other schistosomes. But unlike other schistosomes that release eggs in the intestine, it releases its eggs in the urinary tract, which are excreted along with the urine. In stagnant freshwater, the eggs hatch within 15 minutes into the larvae called miracidia. Each miracidium is either male or female. Miracidia are covered with hair-like cilia with which they actively swim searching for snails. Unless they infect a snail within 24–28 hours, they run out of energy (glycogen) reserves and die. Snail species belonging to the genus Bulinus, including B. globosus, B. forskalii, B. nasutus, B. nyassanus, and B. truncatus, can harbour the miracidia. The miracidia pierce through the soft skin of the snail and move to the liver. Inside the snail, their cilia is cast off and extra-epithelial covering forms within 24 hours. Then they transform into sporocysts and undergo active cell division after two weeks. The mother sporocyst produces many daughter sporocysts. Each daughter sporocyst forms new larvae called cercariae. One mother sporocyst produces half a million cercariae. After a month, the sporocysts rupture and cercariae are liberated. Free cercariae penetrate the liver and move out of the snail into water. Each cercaria has a biforked tail with which it swims to find a human host. Again the cercariae are short lived and can survive in water for 4–6 days unless they find a human host.

The involvement of the Planorbarius metidjensis snail, which is native to Northwestern Africa and the Iberian peninsula is possible, though clear evidence only stems from experimental infections.

When a human comes in contact with infested water, the cercariae attach themselves on the skin using their suckers. After proper orientation, they start piercing the skin by secreting proteolytic enzymes that widen the skin pores (hair follicles). This process takes about 3–5 minutes and produces itching, but by then, they have penetrated the skin. Their tails are removed during the penetration such that only the head parts enter. When they enter the blood vessels, they are known as schisotomulae. They enter the systemic system to reach the heart and then the liver, and along the way many are killed by the immune cells. Survivors enter the liver within 24 hours. From the liver they enter the portal vein to reach different parts of the body. Unlike other species again, the schistosomulae of S. haematobium reach the vesical vessels through anastomotic channels between radicles of the inferior mesenteric vein and pelvic veins. After living inside small venules in the submucosa and wall of the bladder, they migrate to the perivesical venous plexus (a group of veins at the lower portion of the bladder) to attain full maturation. To evade detection by the host's immune system, the adults have the ability to coat themselves with host antigen.

Individuals sort out opposite sexes. The female body becomes enveloped within the rolled-up gynaecophoric canal of the male; thus, becoming partners for life. Sexual maturation is attained after 4–6 weeks of initial infection. A female generally lays 500–1,000 eggs in a day. The female only leaves the male briefly for laying eggs. It has to because only it can enter the small and narrow peripheral venule in the submucosa so that the eggs can be released into the bladder. The embryonated eggs penetrate the bladder mucosa using proteolytic enzymes, aided by their terminal spines and by the contraction of the bladder. The enzyme is a toxin specifically for damaging (necrosis) the tissue. Under normal situation, the eggs released into the bladder do not cause pathological symptoms. But eggs often fail to penetrate the bladder mucosa and remain trapped in the bladder wall; it is these which produce the lesions by releasing their antigens and provoking granuloma formation. Granulomata in turn coalesce to form tubercles, nodules or masses that often ulcerate. This is the condition behind the pathological lesions found in the bladder wall, ureter and renal; and also tumour, both benign and malignant. The fluke continuously lays eggs throughout their life. An average lifespan is 3–4 years.

== Diagnosis ==
Traditionally, diagnoses has been made by examination of the urine for eggs. In chronic infections, or if eggs are difficult to find, an intradermal injection of schistosome antigen to form a wheal is effective in determining infection. Alternatively, diagnosis can be made by complement fixation tests. As of 2012, commercial blood tests included ELISA and an indirect immunofluorescence test, but these have low sensitivity, ranging from 21% to 71%.

== Prevention ==
The main cause of schistomiasis is the dumping of human waste into water supplies. Hygienic disposal of waste would be sufficient to eliminate the disease. Water for drinking and bathing should be boiled in endemic regions. Infested water should be avoided. However, agricultural activities such as fishing and rice cultivation involve long contact with water, making avoidance impractical. Systematic eradication of snails is an effective method.

== Pathology ==
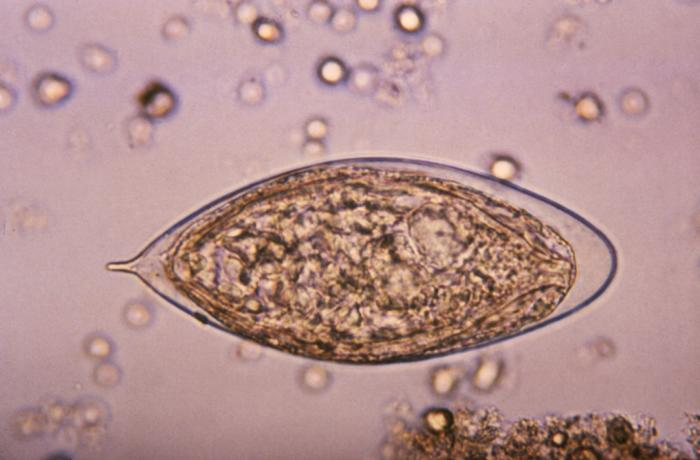
Egg of S. haematobium. Note the pointed spine on the left tip.

Normal infection of adults does not produce symptoms. When eggs are released, they sometimes become permanently stuck in the bladder and cause pathological symptoms. The eggs are initially deposited in the muscularis propria which leads to ulceration of the overlaying tissue. Infections are characterized by pronounced acute inflammation, squamous metaplasia, blood and reactive epithelial changes. Granulomas and multinucleated giant cells may be seen. The eggs induce a granulomatous host immune response which is indicated by lymphocytes (which mainly produce T-helper-2 cytokines such as interleukins 4, 5, and 13), eosinophils, and activated macrophages. This granuloma formation induces chronic inflammation.

In response to infection, the hosts' antibodies bind to the tegument of the schistosome. But they are quickly removed as the tegument itself is shed every few hours. The schistosome can also take on host proteins. Schistomiasis can be divided into three phases: (1) the migratory phase lasting from penetration to maturity,(2) the acute phase which occurs when the schistosomes begin producing eggs, and (3) the chronic phase which occurs mainly in endemic areas. In late stage, the infection may lead to extra-urinary complication named bilharzial cor pulmonale. The distinct symptom for urogenital schistosomiasis is blood in the urine (haematuria), which is often associated with frequent urination, painful micturition, and discomfort in the groin. In endemic regions, haematuria is so widespread that it is thought a natural sign of puberty for boys, and is confused with menses in girls. Under serious infection, urinary tract can be blocked leading to obstructive uropathy (hydroureter and hydronephrosis), which can be further complicated by bacterial infection and kidney failure. In the most severe condition, chronic bladder ulcers and bladder carcinoma develop.

== Treatment ==
The drug of choice is praziquantel, but it has low cure rate (only 82–88%).

== Epidemiology ==
S. hematobium is found in Africa and the Middle East, where infants and young children are most infected. Infection is most prevalent in both the Nile Delta and the Nile Valley South of Cairo. The first epidemiological survey, in 1937, indicated that infection rate was as high as 85% among people in the Northern and Eastern parts of the Delta. Following construction of the Aswan Dam, basin irrigation has been converted to a perennial irrigation system, and this has significantly reduced the incidence of infection.
