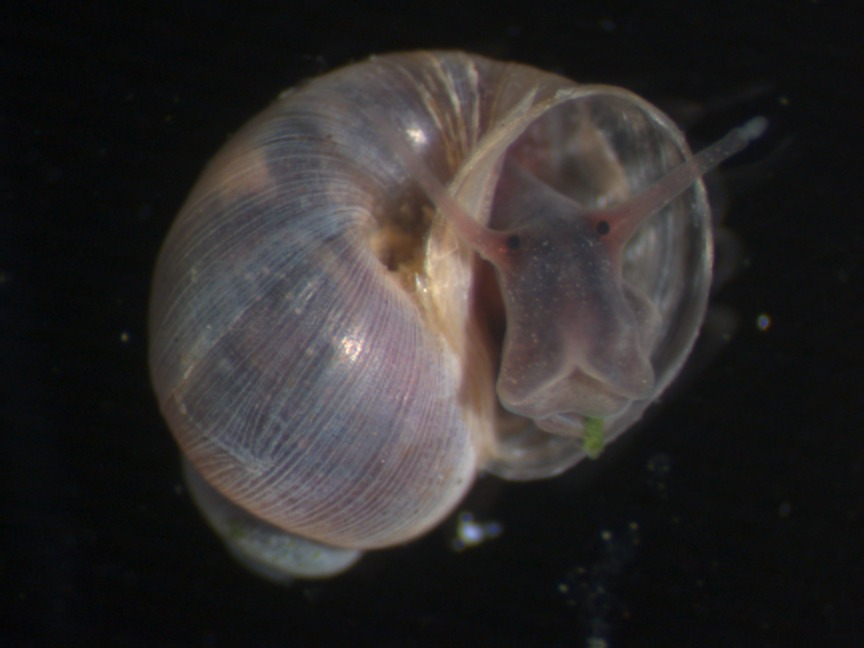
- Bulinus wrighti

Scientific classification
- Kingdom: Animalia
- Phylum: Mollusca
- Class: Gastropoda
- Superorder: Hygrophila
- Family: Bulinidae
- Subfamily: Bulininae
- Tribe: Bulinini
- Genus: Bulinus; O. F. Müller, 1781

Diversity
- 37 extant species, at least 7 fossil species

Synonyms
- List: Bulinus (Bulinus) O. F. Müller, 1781; Bulinus (Isidora) Ehrenberg, 1831; Bulinus (Physopsis) F. Krauss, 1848; Bulinus (Pyrgophysa) Crosse, 1879; Bullinus Oken, 1815 [lapsus]; Bulinus (Isidora) Ehrenberg, 1831; Isidora Ehrenberg, 1831; Isidora (Physopsis) F. Krauss, 1848; †Kosovia Atanacković, 1959; †Kosovia (Kosovia) Atanacković, 1959; Limnaea (Bulinus) O.F. Müller, 1781; Physa (Bulinus) O.F. Müller, 1781; Physa (Isidora) Ehrenberg, 1831; Physa (Pyrgophysa) Crosse, 1879; Physopsis F. Krauss, 1848; Pulmobranchia Pelseneer, 1894; Pyrgophysa Crosse, 1879

= Bulinus =

Genus of gastropods

Bulinus is a genus of small tropical freshwater snails, aquatic gastropod mollusks in the family Bulinidae, the ramshorn snails and their allies.

This genus is medically important because several species of Bulinus function as intermediate hosts for the schistosomiasis blood fluke.

== Description ==
The shell of species in the genus Bulinus is sinistral. It has a very large body whorl and a small spire.

== Distribution and habitat ==
Species of the genus are widespread in Africa including Madagascar and the Middle East.

This genus has not yet become established in the USA, but it is considered to represent a potentially serious threat as a pest, an invasive species which could negatively affect agriculture, natural ecosystems, human health or commerce. Therefore it has been suggested that this species be given top national quarantine significance in the USA.

The genus Bulinus has arguably the greatest and widespread distribution of all pulmonate snail species in the Afromontane regions. This can be attributed to its great ability to adapt and increase its range from freshwater ponds at sea-level to extreme altitudes as experienced on the "sky islands". A recent study has recently extended the range of Bulinus by 900 m to around 4,000 m on top of Mt. Elgon. Specifically, some of the places they can be found in include pools and wetlands marshes. They also can be found in standing or slow-moving (lentic) and running (lotic) waterbodies.

It has been predicted that climate change has been the cause to changes in Bulinus species distribution. This has led to changes in endemism and evolutionary dynamics such as speciation and extinction.

== Feeding strategies ==
Bulinus species are herbivorous freshwater snails that primarily graze on algae and detritus. They are classified as grazers, and their feeding habits play an important role in nutrient cycling and the overall ecosystem of freshwater habitats. They graze on biofilms that are composed of bacteria, fungi, and protozoans. They have a similar feeding mechanism to other freshwater gastropods, using their radula to scrape surfaces and ingest food. The radula is lined with rows of microscopic teeth.

== Dormancy ==
Seasonal droughts are common in the habitats of the Bulinus snails and it has long been a topic of discussion to scientists of how the snails are capable of enduring and aestivate through the long-lasting and harsh climates and weather cycles. Aestivation is common in snails, which is when the snail undergoes periodic dormancy due to decreased moisture in the environment. Studies towards snail dormancy have been halted due to the mystery of where Bulinus snails aestivate, which therefore complicate efforts into schistosomiasis disease prevention.

After up to seven months of dry season yearly, wet season brings the rapid reemergence of whole Bulinus snail populations who have been aestivating with decreased metabolism and many various physiological adaptations. It was also discovered that Bulinus snails delay egg-laying for about 2 weeks following aestivation.

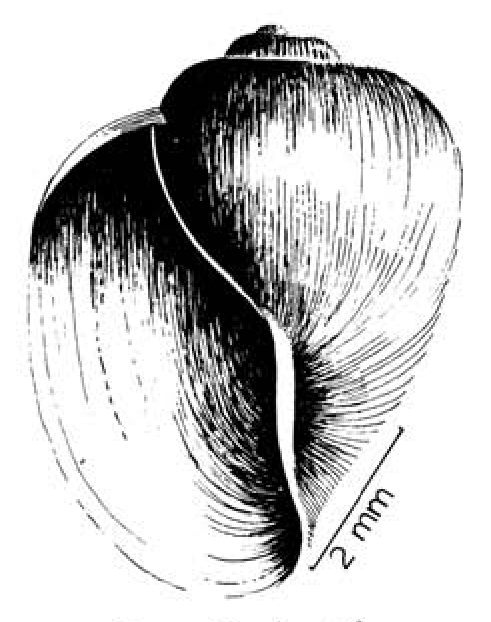
Sinistral shell of Bulinus tropicus

== Invasive effects ==
Bulinus snails have become established as both an invasive species and an intermediate host of smaller invasive parasites that severely impact human health. Blood flukes are the parasite that latches on to these snails, causing them to indirectly transmit urinary schistosomiasis. An example can be seen in Zimbabwe, where Bulinus globosus is the primary vector for urinary schistosomiasis. Large outbreaks of blood flukes can occur in rural communities with untreated water. Climate change has expanded the snails range, which has worsened the outbreaks.

== Schistosomiasis transmission ==
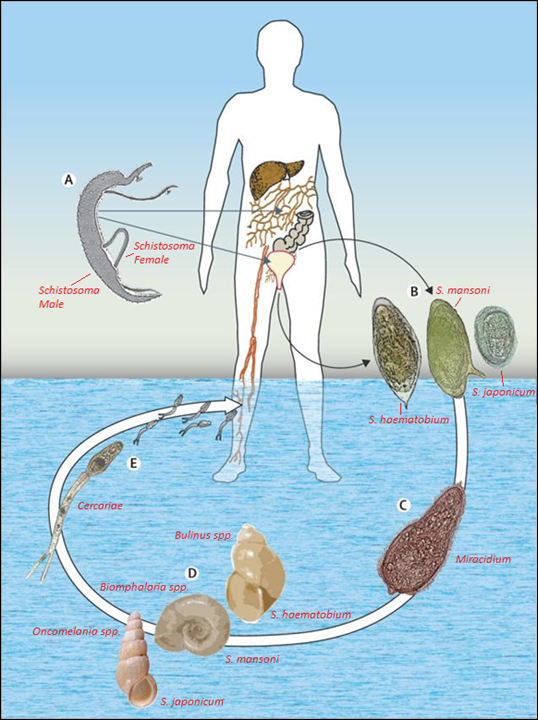
Role of Bulinus in the life cycle of Schistosoma spp.

Much of the importance of the Bulinus genus of snails comes from its role as an intermediate host for the disease schistosomiasis. It is vital to understand the epidemiology of the organisms that cause this disease (Schistosoma species) in these snails to create effective plans and measures to control the transmission of schistosomiasis. In Africa alone, at least 130 million people are affected by human urogenital schistosomiasis.

In the transmission of S. haematobium, Bulinus snails are infected through free-swimming miracidia stage of the parasite where the Bulinus snails facilitate the asexual reproduction of the flatworm. Cercariae are produced whom then seek out humans who are in water in which they infect and produce eggs which will be urinated and hatch into miracidia to continue the cycle of schistosomiasis infection. Learning the life cycle of both Bulinus and Schistosoma species is important because, in rural areas where agriculture is common industry, land is altered to increase agricultural water where ponds and networks of rain catchment become snail hotspots that have great potential to transmit schistosomiasis. There may also be an increase of susceptibility to schistosome transmission in snails following aestivation.

== Species ==
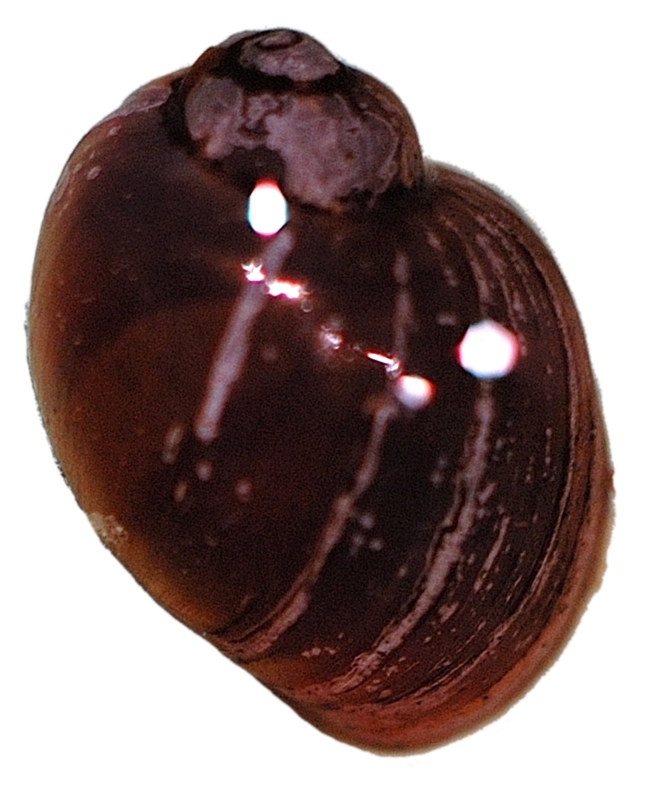
Lateral view of a shell of Bulinus truncatus.

Species within the genus Bulinus have been placed into four species groups: the Bulinus africanus group, Bulinus forskalii group, Bulinus reticulatus group and the Bulinus truncatus/tropicus complex. For the most part, species have been classified on the basis of their morphology although, in recent decades, the study of ploidy, allozymes and DNA methods have all played an increasing role in species discrimination. Morphological characters, whilst adequate to allocate a specimen to a species group are sometimes unreliable when used to classify at higher resolution especially within the Bulinus africanus group.

The following species are recognised in the genus Bulinus:

Bulinus africanus group

- Bulinus abyssinicus (Martens, 1866)
- Bulinus africanus (Krauss, 1848)
- Bulinus globosus (Morelet, 1866)
- Bulinus hightoni Brown & Wright, 1978
- Bulinus jousseaumei (Dautzenberg, 1890)
- Bulinus nasutus (Martens, 1879)
- Bulinus obtusispira (Smith, 1882)
- Bulinus obtusus Mandahl-Barth, 1973
- Bulinus ugandae Mandahl-Barth, 1954
- Bulinus umbilicatus Mandahl-Barth, 1973

Bulinus forskalii group

- Bulinus barthi Jelnes, 1979
- Bulinus bavayi (Dautzenberg, 1894)
- Bulinus beccarii (Paladilhe, 1872)
- Bulinus browni Jelnes, 1979
- Bulinus camerunensis Mandahl-Barth, 1957
- Bulinus canescens (Morelet, 1868)
- Bulinus crystallinus (Morelet, 1868)
- Bulinus forskalii (Ehrenberg, 1831)
- Bulinus scalaris (Dunker, 1845)
- Bulinus senegalensis Müller, 1781 - the type species of the genus

Bulinus reticulatus group

- Bulinus reticulatus Mandahl-Barth, 1954
- Bulinus wrighti Mandahl-Barth, 1965

Bulinus truncatus/tropicus complex

- Bulinus angolensis (Morelet, 1866)
- Bulinus depressus Haas, 1936
- Bulinus hexaploidus Burch, 1972
- Bulinus liratus (Tristram, 1863)
- Bulinus mutandensis Preston, 1913
- Bulinus natalensis (Küster, 1841)
- Bulinus nyassanus (E. A. Smith, 1877)
- Bulinus octoploidus Burch, 1972
- Bulinus permembranaceus (Preston, 1912)
- Bulinus succinoides (E. A. Smith, 1877)
- Bulinus transversalis (Martens, 1897)
- Bulinus trigonus (Martens, 1892)
- †Bulinus trojanus (Neumayr, 1883)
- Bulinus tropicus (Krauss, 1848)
- Bulinus truncatus (Audouin, 1827)
- Bulinus yemenensis Paggi et al., 1978

Other

- †Bulinus arinus G.-X. Zhu, 1980
- †Bulinus banlashanensis X.-H. Yu, 1987
- †Bulinus bouei (Pavlović, 1931) - from late Miocene
- †Bulinus corici Harzhauser & Neubauer, 2012 - from middle Miocene
- Bulinus dautzenbergi (Germain, 1905)
- †Bulinus dilatatus G.-X. Zhu, 1980
- †Bulinus fuxinensis X.-H. Yu, 1987
- Bulinus indicus A. N. Subba Rao, Mitra, Parashar, G. P. Gupta & K. M. Rao, 1994
- †Bulinus kormosi Soós, 1934
- † Bulinus matejici (Pavlović, 1931) - from middle Miocene
- †Bulinus ovaformis X.-H. Yu, 1987
- † Bulinus pavlovici (Atanacković, 1959) - from late Miocene
- †Bulinus pijiagouensis X.-H. Yu, 1987
- †Bulinus stevanovici (Atanacković, 1959) - late Miocene
- †Bulinus striatus (Milošević, 1978) - late Miocene
- †Bulinus yushugouensis (G.-X. Zhu, 1976)
