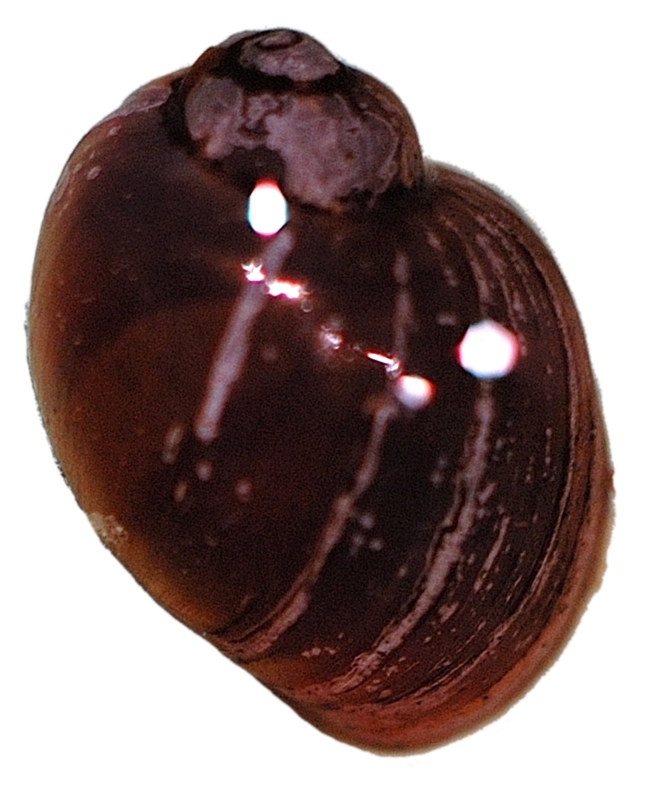
- A lateral view of the shell of Bulinus truncatus truncatus

Conservation status
- Least Concern (IUCN 3.1)

Scientific classification
- Kingdom: Animalia
- Phylum: Mollusca
- Class: Gastropoda
- Superorder: Hygrophila
- Family: Bulinidae
- Genus: Bulinus
- Species: B. truncatus

Binomial name
- Bulinus truncatus (Audouin, 1827)

Synonyms
- Bulinus (Bulinus) truncatus (Audoin, 1827) (new combination); Bulinus (Isidora) dybowskii P. Fischer, 1891· accepted, alternate representation; Bulinus (Isidora) truncatus (Audouin, 1827)· accepted, alternate representation; Bulinus (Isidora) truncatus rohlfsi (Clessin, 1886) (junior synonym); Bulinus (Isidora) truncatus truncatus (Audouin, 1827)· accepted, alternate representation; Bulinus dybowskii P. Fischer, 1891; Bulinus guernei (Dautzenberg, 1890) (junior synonym); Bulinus hemprichii (Ehrenberg, 1831) (junior synonym); Bulinus rohlfsi (Clessin, 1886); Bulinus sericinus (Jickeli, 1874) (a junior synonym); Bullinus (Isidora) mussolinii Piersanti, 1940 (a junior synonym); Isidora guernei Dautzenberg, 1890 (junior synonym); Isidora hemprichii Ehrenberg, 1831; Isidora sericina Jickeli, 1874 (a junior synonym); Physa (Isidora) vaneyi Germain, 1907; Physa coulboisi Bourguignat, 1888 (junior synonym); Physa mutandaensis Preston, 1913 (junior synonym); Physa rohlfsi Clessin, 1886 (a junior synonym); Physa truncata Audouin, 1827

= Bulinus truncatus =

Species of gastropod

Bulinus truncatus is a species of air-breathing freshwater snail with a sinistral shell, an aquatic pulmonate gastropod mollusk in the subfamily Bulininae of the family Bulinidae, the ram's horn snails and the like.

Subspecies

- Bulinus truncatus contortus (Michaud, 1829) (synonym: Physa contorta Michaud, 1829)
- Bulinus truncatus rivularis (Philippi, 1836)
- Bulinus truncatus truncatus (Audouin, 1827)

== Distribution ==
Distribution of Bulinus truncatus include:

- Africa: Egypt, Morocco Northern Sahara, D.R. Congo, Malawi and Ethiopia.
- As of 2011 in Ferlo Valley, Western Africa: Senegal
- As of 2014 in El Ejido (province of Almeria, southern Andalusia), lagoon of Villena (province of Alicante, northern Catalonia, Spain
- Continental France and Corsica
- Continental Greece and Crete
- Italy (Sardinia and Sicily)
- Portugal
- Malta
- Middle East (Iran, Iraq and Saudi Arabia, Jordan, Israel and Yemen).

== Parasites ==
This species is an intermediate host for Schistosoma haematobium and Paramphistomum cervi and Paramphistomum microbothrium.
