= Bulinidae =

Scientific classification
- Kingdom: Animalia
- Phylum: Mollusca
- Class: Gastropoda
- Superorder: Hygrophila
- Superfamily: Lymnaeoidea
- Family: Bulinidae; Fischer & Crosse, 1880

Type genus
- Bulinus O. F. Müller, 1781

Family of gastropods

Bulinidae is a family of gastropods in the superfamily Lymnaeoidea.

== Genera ==
- Subfamily Bulininae Fischer & Crosse, 1880
  - Bulinus Müller, 1781
  - Hopeiella Yü & Pan, 1982 †
  - Indoplanorbis Annandale, Prashad & Amid-ud-Din, 1921
  - Macrophysa Meek, 1865 †
  - Popovicia Neubauer & Harzhauser in Neubauer et al., 2015 †
- Subfamily Plesiophysinae Bequaert & Clench, 1939
  - Plesiophysa Fischer, 1883
