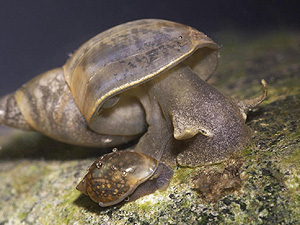
- The larger of the two snails is Lymnaea stagnalis, family Lymnaeidae; the smaller one is Physella acuta, family Physidae

Scientific classification
- Kingdom: Animalia
- Phylum: Mollusca
- Class: Gastropoda
- Subclass: Heterobranchia
- Infraclass: Euthyneura
- Subterclass: Tectipleura
- Superorder: Hygrophila; Férussac, 1822

Superfamilies
- See text

Synonyms
- Basommatophora

= Hygrophila (gastropod) =

Clade of gastropods

Hygrophila is a taxonomic superorder of air-breathing freshwater snails, aquatic pulmonate gastropod mollusks within the clade Panpulmonata.

The families in this clade are basically air-breathing freshwater snails including freshwater limpets. The three families with the greatest number of species are the Lymnaeidae (pond snails), the Planorbidae (ramshorn snails) and the Physidae (pouch or bubble snails). These are found in ponds, creeks, ditches, and shallow lakes nearly worldwide.

The snails in this clade have their eyes located at the base of their tentacles, rather than at the tips, as in the true land snails Stylommatophora. They have shells that are thin, translucent, and relatively colorless, and they lack an operculum.

== Taxonomy ==
=== 1997 taxonomy ===
In the older taxonomy of the Gastropoda (Ponder & Lindberg, 1997) these families were placed in the suborder Basommatophora.

=== 2005 taxonomy ===
Hygrophila has been a clade in the informal group Basommatophora within the Pulmonata.

Clade Hygrophila:

- Superfamily Chilinoidea Dall, 1870
  - Family Chilinidae Dall, 1870
  - Family Latiidae Hutton, 1882
- Superfamily Acroloxoidea Thiele, 1931
  - Family Acroloxidae Thiele, 1931
- Superfamily Lymnaeoidea Rafinesque, 1815
  - Family Lymnaeidae Rafinesque, 1815
- Superfamily Planorboidea Rafinesque, 1815
  - Family Planorbidae Rafinesque, 1815
  - Family Physidae Fitzinger, 1833

Note: what was previously the family Ancylidae has been demoted in the new taxonomy to the status of tribe Ancylini Rafinesque, 1815 within the subfamily Planorbinae Rafinesque, 1815 of the family Planorbidae Rafinesque, 1815.

=== 2010 taxonomy ===
Basommatophora (Siphonarioidea and Amphiboloidea and Hygrophila) have been found polyphyletic and so Jörger et al. (2010) have moved Hygrophila to Panpulmonata.

=== 2020 taxonomy ===
A comprehensive molecular phylogenetic analysis of Hygrophila based on 3112 sites of the large subunit and 5.8S ribosomal RNA genes resulted in a proposal of a new taxonomic revision of the group.

- Chilinoidea Dall, 1870
- Lymnaeoidea Rafinesque, 1815

Synonyms

- Acroloxoidea Thiele, 1931: synonym of Lymnaeoidea Rafinesque, 1815
- Planorboidea Rafinesque, 1815: synonym of Lymnaeoidea Rafinesque, 1815
