= List of non-marine molluscs of Zambia =

Non-marine molluscs found in Zambia

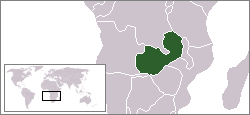
Location of Zambia

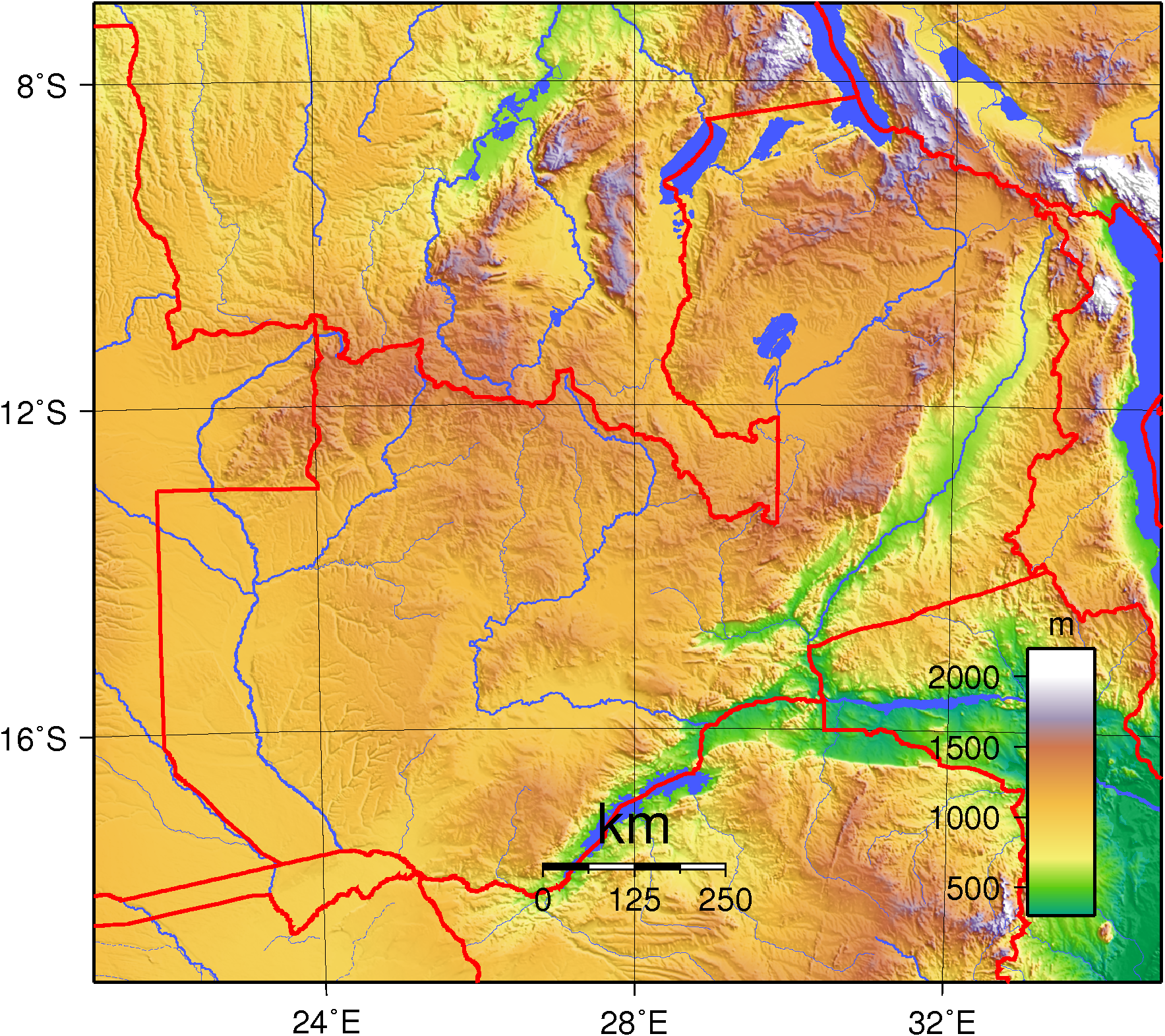
The topography of Zambia

The non-marine molluscs of Zambia are part of the molluscan fauna of Zambia (wildlife of Zambia). As a landlocked country, Zambia's non-marine molluscs comprise terrestrial and freshwater species.

The country's non-marine molluscan fauna isn't comprehensively documented. A checklist published in 1988 included 56 terrestrial taxa, but collecting records were concentrated in only a few localities. Many species have been reported from only a few sites, and their distributions aren't understood properly.

== Freshwater gastropods ==
Freshwater gastropods recorded in Zambia include the following species. A survey conducted in Lusaka Province between July 2006 and February 2007 recorded 15 freshwater snail taxa, including an unidentified species of Gabbiella.

Paludomidae

- Hirthia globosa Ancey, 1898
- Hirthia littorina Ancey, 1898
- Martelia dautzenbergi Dupuis, 1924
- Martelia tanganyicensis Dautzenberg, 1908
- Cleopatra nsendweensis (Dupuis & Putzeys, 1901)

Planorbidae

- Bulinus africanus (Krauss, 1848)
- Bulinus globosus (Morelet, 1866)
- Bulinus canescens (Morelet, 1868)
- Bulinus forskalii (Ehrenberg, 1831)
- Biomphalaria pfeifferi (Krauss, 1848)
- Gyraulus costulatus (Krauss, 1848)
- Segmentorbis angustus (Jickeli, 1874)
- Pettancylus burnupi (B. Walker, 1912), reported as Ferrissia burnupi in the Lusaka Province survey.

Lymnaeidae

- Radix natalensis (Krauss, 1848), reported as Lymnaea natalensis in the Lusaka Province survey.

Physidae

- Physella acuta (Draparnaud, 1805), reported as Physa acuta in the Lusaka Province survey.

Viviparidae

- Bellamya capillata (Frauenfeld, 1865)

Bithyniidae

- Gabbiella kisalensis
- Gabbiella sp. (unidentified species)

Ampullariidae

- Lanistes ovum Peters, 1845

Thiaridae

- Melanoides tuberculata (O. F. Müller, 1774)

A separate study of freshwater snails in Lusaka found that Bulinus africanus and Bulinus globosus were associated particularly with habitats retaining water for substantial parts of the year. Biomphalaria pfeifferi, an intermediate host of Schistosoma mansoni, was found mainly in streams and impoundments such as dams.

== Land gastropods ==
Land gastropods recorded in Zambia include:

- Achatina craveni E. A. Smith, 1881. This species was included in the country's 1988 terrestrial-snail checklist. Its taxonomic relationship with Achatina tavaresiana has been disputed.
- Afroguppya rumrutiensis (Preston, 1911). This species has been recorded living in Zambia at Chowo Forest, near the border with Malawi.
- Burtoa nilotica (L. Pfeiffer, 1861). The subspecies B. n. arnoldi (Sturany, 1898) was recorded in Kafue National Park, including in mopane woodland.
- Cecilioides gokweanus (O. Boettger, 1870), listed as the only species of the genus Cecilioides recorded from Zambia in the published literature reviewed in 2024.
- Cerastua procrastinationis van Bruggen, 1993, described in a study of the terrestrial molluscs of Malawi and Zambia.

Note: The published terrestrial fauna is unevenly documented, with a substantial proportion of the historical collecting effort concentrated around a limited number of localities, including Chowo Forest.

== Freshwater bivalves ==
Freshwater bivalves recorded in Zambia include:

- Iridinidae
- Chambardia flava (Pilsbry & Bequaert, 1927). This species is documented in the Upper Congo basin, including the Lake Bangweulu region and the Chambeshi River in Zambia, according to museum records.
- Mutela zambesiensis Mandahl-Barth, 1988. This freshwater mussel occurs in the Zambezi basin. Its type locality is the Zambezi River between Kariba and Chirundu, including Lake Kariba near Siavonga, Zambia according to museum records.

== Fossil and archaeological records ==
Non-marine mollusc shells have also been recovered from fossil and archaeological deposits in Zambia. Research on deposits associated with Palaeolake Kafue, near the archaeological site of Twin Rivers Kopje southwest of Lusaka, documented a Pleistocene assemblage containing terrestrial gastropods and freshwater snails.

The terrestrial material included Afroguppya rumrutiensis and specimens identified as Helicarion cf. issangoensis. Freshwater specimens belonged to the families Planorbidae and Lymnaeidae, but their incomplete preservation and broken snail shells prevented their identification at a species-level. These findings show evidence that molluscs that inhabited the Lake Kafue region during the Pleistocene, but don't show us if all identified species still occur there today.

== See also ==
Lists of molluscs of surrounding countries:

- List of non-marine molluscs of the Democratic Republic of the Congo, Wildlife of the Democratic Republic of the Congo
- List of non-marine molluscs of Tanzania, Wildlife of Tanzania
- List of non-marine molluscs of Malawi, Wildlife of Malawi
- List of non-marine molluscs of Mozambique, Wildlife of Mozambique
- List of non-marine molluscs of Zimbabwe, Wildlife of Zimbabwe
- List of non-marine molluscs of Botswana, Wildlife of Botswana
- List of non-marine molluscs of Namibia, Wildlife of Namibia
- List of non-marine molluscs of Angola, Wildlife of Angola
