= List of non-marine molluscs of Zimbabwe =

Location of Zimbabwe

The list of non-marine molluscs of Zimbabwe is a list of freshwater and land species that form a part of the molluscan fauna of Zimbabwe (wildlife of Zimbabwe).

== Freshwater gastropods ==
Ampullariidae

- Lanistes ovum Peters, 1845

Viviparidae

- Bellamya capillata (Frauenfeld, 1865)

Thiaridae

- Melanoides tuberculata (O. F. Müller, 1774)

Planorbidae

- Biomphalaria pfeifferi (Krauss, 1848)
- Bulinus forskalii (Ehrenberg, 1831)
- Bulinus globosus (Morelet, 1866)
- Bulinus tropicus (Krauss, 1848)
- Bulinus truncatus (Audouin, 1827)
- Ceratophallus natalensis (F. Krauss, 1848)
- Gyraulus costulatus (Krauss, 1848)
- Physella acuta (Draparnaud, 1805)
- Planorbella duryi (Wetherby, 1879)

Lymnaeidae

- Pseudosuccinea columella (Say, 1817)
- Radix natalensis (Krauss, 1848)

== Land gastropods ==
Succineidae

- Oxyloma patentissima (Pfeiffer, 1853)
- Succinea africana Krauss, 1848

Cochlicopidae

- Cochlicopa lubrica (Porro, 1838) - introduced

Pupillidae

- Gibbulinopsis fontana (Krauss, 1848)

Cerastidae

- Rachis jejuna (Melvill & Ponsonby, 1893)
- Rhachistia sticta (E. von Martens, 1860)

Achatinidae

- Achatina connollyi Preston, 1912
- Burtoa nilotica (L. Pfeiffer, 1861)
- Opeas lineare (Krauss, 1848)
- Xerocerastus burchelli (J. E. Gray, 1834)

Euconulidae

- Afroguppya rumrutiensis (Preston, 1911)

Streptaxidae

- Tayloria gwandaensis (Preston, 1912)

Urocyclidae

- Gymnarion chirindicus E. Binder, 1981
- Gymnarion vumbae E. Binder, 1981
- Polytoxon robustum (Simroth, 1896)
- Thapsia pinguis (Krauss, 1848)
- Trochonanina thermarum (Melvill & Ponsonby, 1909)

Helicidae

- Cornu aspersum (O. F. Müller, 1774) - introduced

== See also ==
Lists of molluscs of surrounding countries:

- List of non-marine molluscs of South Africa
- List of non-marine molluscs of Botswana
- List of non-marine molluscs of Zambia
- List of non-marine molluscs of Mozambique
