= List of non-marine molluscs of Mozambique =

Location of Mozambique

The list of non-marine molluscs of Mozambique is a list of freshwater and land species that form a part of the molluscan fauna of Mozambique (wildlife of Mozambique).

The terrestrial malacofauna of Mozambique is underreported and under-collected. As a result, on the whole exact data are scarce.

For example, there are known 46 species of terrestrial gastropods from Cabo Delgado Province, north-eastern corner of Mozambique, 28 species of terrestrial gastropods from Gorongosa National Park including its surroundings.

== Freshwater gastropods ==
Neritidae

- Neritina natalensis Reeve, 1855

Paludomidae

- Cleopatra ferruginea (I. & H. C. Lea, 1850)
- Cleopatra hemmingi (Verdcourt, 1956)
- Cleopatra nsendweensis Dupuis & Putzeys, 1902 – uncertain presence

Viviparidae

- Bellamya capillata (Frauenfeld, 1865)
- Bellamya jeffreysi (Frauenfeld, 1865)
- Bellamya robertsoni Frauenfeld, 1865

Bithyniidae

- Gabbiella kisalensis (Pilsbry & Bequaert, 1927)

Planorbidae

- Africanogyrus coretus (de Blainville, 1826)
- Bulinus africanus (Krauss, 1848)
- Bulinus forskalii (Ehrenberg, 1831)
- Bulinus globosus (Morelet, 1866)
- Bulinus natalensis (Küster, 1841)
- Bulinus reticulatus Mandahl-Barth, 1954
- Bulinus tropicus (Krauss, 1848)
- Burnupia caffra (Krauss, 1848)
- Ceratophallus natalensis (Krauss, 1848)
- Ferrissia junodi Connolly, 1925
- Gyraulus costulatus (Krauss, 1848)
- Lentorbis carringtoni (de Azevedo et al., 1961)
- Lentorbis junodi (Connolly, 1922)
- Segmentorbis angustus (Jickeli, 1874)
- Segmentorbis kanisaensis (Preston, 1914)

Assimineidae

- Assiminea bifasciata Nevill, 1880
- Eussoia leptodonta Nevill, 1881 – freshwater or marine species

Ellobiidae

- Cassidula labrella (Deshayes, 1830)

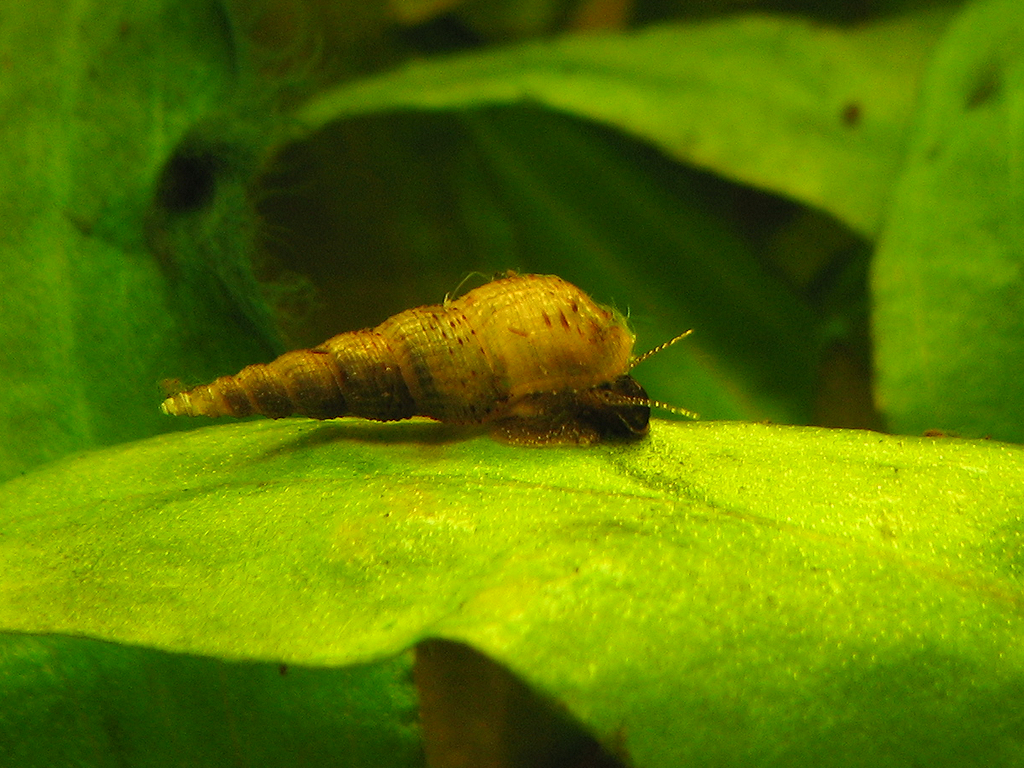
Melanoides tuberculata is native to Mozambique

Thiaridae

- Melanoides nodicincta (Dohrn, 1865)
- Melanoides nyassana (Smith, 1877)
- Melanoides pergracilis (Von Martens, 1897)
- Melanoides tuberculata (O. F. Müller, 1774)
- Melanoides victoriae (Dorhn, 1865)

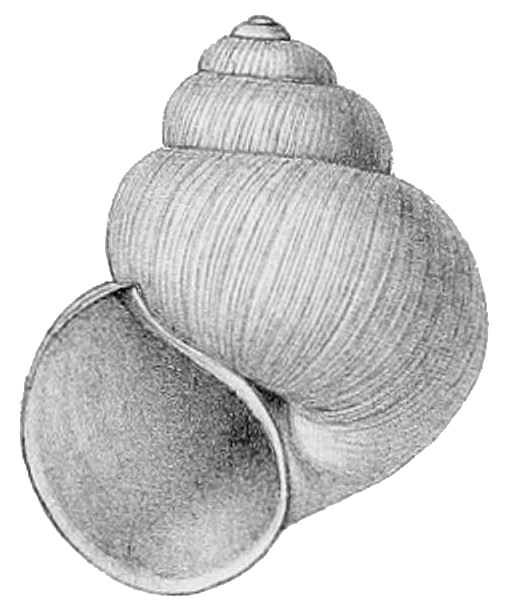
drawing of apertural view of the shell of Lanistes ovum, a freshwater snail which is native to Mozambique

Ampullariidae

- Pila ovata (Olivier, 1808)
- Lanistes ellipticus Martens, 1866
- Lanistes nasutus Mandahl-Barth, 1972
- Lanistes nyassanus Dohrn, 1865
- Lanistes ovum Peters, 1845
- Lanistes solidus Smith, 1877

Lymnaeidae

- Radix natalensis (Krauss, 1848)

== Land gastropods ==
Pomatiidae

- Tropidophora anceps (Von Martens, 1878)
- Tropidophora insularis (Pfeiffer, 1852) / Tropidophora transvaalensis (Melvill & Ponsonby, 1895)
- Tropidophora ligata (Müller, 1774)

Succineidae

- Oxyloma patentissima (Pfeiffer, 1853)

Cerastidae

- Rachis jejuna (Melvill & Ponsonby, 1893)
- Rachis sp.
- Rhachistia sticta (Von Martens, 1859)

Achatinidae

- Achatina vassei Germain, 1918
- A. immaculata Lamarck, 1822
- Achatina cf. craveni E.A. Smith, 1881

Subulinidae

- Homorus manueli Preston, 1910
- Curvella nyasana E. A. Smith, 1899
- Curvella whytei E.A. Smith, 1899
- Pseudoglessula boivini (Morelet, 1860)
- Pseudoglessula cressyi Connolly, 1925
- Pseudoglessula kirki (Dohrn, 1865)

Streptaxidae

- Gonaxis cressyi Connolly, 1922
- Gonaxis elongatus (Fulton, 1899)
- Gonaxis gwandaensis (Preston, 1912)
- Streptostele inconspicua Van Bruggen, 1964
- Gulella lawrencei Van Bruggen, 1964
- Gulella sexdentata (Von Martens, 1869)

Charopidae

- Trachycystis sylvicola Van Bruggen & Verdcourt, 1965

Helicarionidae

- Sitala jenynsi (Pfeiffer, 1845)

Urocyclidae

- Atoxon sp.
- Zingis brunneofasciata Verdcourt, 1961
- Trochonanina bloyeti Bourguignat, 1889
- Trochonanina elatior (Von Martens, 1866)
- Trochonanina mozambicensis (Pfeiffer, 1855)

== Bivalves ==
Unionidae

- Unio caffer Krauss, 1848
- Coelatura hypsiprymna (Haas, 1936)
- Coelatura mossambicensis (von Martens, 1860)

Iridinidae (or Mutelidae)

- Chambardia petersii (Martens, 1860)
- Chambardia wahlbergi (Krauss, 1848)

Corbiculidae

- Corbicula astartina von Martens, 1860

Sphaeriidae

- Pisidium pirothi Jickeli, 1881

== See also ==
- List of marine molluscs of Mozambique

Lists of molluscs of surrounding countries:

- List of non-marine molluscs of Tanzania
- List of non-marine molluscs of Malawi
- List of non-marine molluscs of Zambia
- List of non-marine molluscs of Zimbabwe
- List of non-marine molluscs of South Africa
- List of non-marine molluscs of Eswatini

overseas:

- List of non-marine molluscs of Madagascar
- List of non-marine molluscs of Mayotte
- List of non-marine molluscs of the Seychelles
