= List of molluscs of Botswana =

Location of Botswana

Botswana molluscs are represented by 63 native species (13 bivalves, 24 freshwater snails, 24 land snails and two slugs) and by four introduced species: Cornu aspersum, Lissachatina fulica, Physella acuta and Radix auricularia, which are potentially invasive and of economic concern. The majority of species occur in the regions of the Okavango Delta and the Chobe–Linyanti–Kwando river system along East Caprivi.

The list follows the alphabetical rather than systematic order, and originates from the latest checklist, which summarizes 170 years (1854–2023) of malacological studies in Botswana.

== Achatinidae ==
Common name: Tropical land snails, including Giant African land snails.

- Achatina ampullacea O. Boettger, 1910
- Achatina dammarensis L. Pfeiffer, 1870
- Achatina passargei E. von Martens, 1900
- Achatina schinziana Mousson, 1888
- Achatina smithii Craven, 1881
- Burtoa nilotica (L. Pfeiffer, 1861)
- Lissachatina fulica (Bowdich, 1822)
- Lissachatina immaculata (Lamarck, 1822)
- Lubricetta subteres (O. Boettger, 1910)
- Opeas lineare (Krauss, 1848)
- Subulina vitrea (Mousson, 1888)
- Xerocerastus burchelli (J.E. Gray, 1834)
- Xerocerastus damarensis (H. Adams, 1870)
- Xerocerastus schultzei (O. Boettger, 1910)

== Ampullariidae ==
Common name: Tropical/Apple snails

- Lanistes ovum Troschel, 1845
- Pila occidentalis (Mousson, 1888)
- Pila wernei (R.A. Philippi, 1851)

== Bithyniidae ==
Common name: Mud freshwater snails

- Gabbiella kisalensis (Pilsbry & Bequaert, 1927)

== Bulinidae ==
Common name: Ram's horn snails

- Bulinus africanus (Krauss, 1848)
- Bulinus depressus F. Haas, 1936
- Bulinus globosus (Morelet, 1866)
- Bulinus scalaris (Dunker, 1845)
- Bulinus tropicus (Krauss, 1848)

== Burnupiidae ==
Common name: Pond snails

- Burnupia trapezoidea (O. Boettger, 1910)

== Cochliopidae ==
Common name: Small freshwater snails

- Lobogenes michaelis Pilsbry & Bequaert, 1927

== Cyrenidae ==
Common name: Porcelain mussels

- Corbicula fluminalis (O.F. Müller, 1774)

== Ferussaciidae ==
Common name: Blind awl snails or pin snails

- Cecilioides gokweana (O. Böttger, 1870)

== Gastrocoptidae ==
Common name: Minute land snails

- Gastrocopta damarica (Ancey, 1888)
- Gastrocopta klunzingeri (Jickeli, 1873)

== Helicidae ==
Common name: Typical snails or helix garden snails

- Cornu aspersum (O.F. Müller, 1774)

== Iridinidae ==
Common name: Toothless River mussels

- Aspatharia subreniformis (G.B. Sowerby II, 1867)
- Chambardia petersi (E. von Martens, 1860)
- Chambardia wahlbergi (Krauss, 1848)
- Mutela zambesiensis Mandahl-Barth, 1988

== Lymnaeidae ==
Common name: Pond snails

- Radix auricularia (Linnaeus, 1758)
- Radix natalensis (Krauss, 1848)

== Paludomidae ==
Common name: Trumpet freshwater snails

- Cleopatra elata Dautzenberg & Germain, 1914
- Cleopatra nsendweensis Dupuis & Putzeys, 1901
- Melanoides tuberculata (O.F. Müller, 1774)
- Melanoides victoriae (Dohrn, 1865)

== Physidae ==
- Physella acuta (Draparnaud, 1805)

== Planorbidae ==
Common name: Ram's horn snails

- Afrogyrorbis natalensis (Krauss, 1848)
- Biomphalaria pfeifferi (Krauss, 1848)
- Biomphalaria salinarum (Morelet, 1867)
- Gyraulus costulatus (Krauss, 1848)
- Hovorbis coretus (Blainville, 1826)
- Pettancylus victoriensis (B. Walker, 1912)
- Segmentorbis angustus (Jickeli, 1874)

== Pupillidae ==
Common name: Minute land snails

- Pupilla tetrodus (O. Böttger, 1870)
- Pupoides calaharicus (O. Boettger, 1886)

== Sphaeriidae ==
Common name: Orb mussels

- Euglesa viridaria (Kuiper, 1956)
- Eupera ferruginea (Krauss, 1848)
- Pisidium reticulatum Kuiper, 1966
- Sphaerium capense (Krauss, 1848)
- Sphaerium incomitatum (Kuiper, 1966)

== Streptaxidae ==
Common name: Carnivorous land snails

- Gulella miniata (Krauss, 1848)
- Tayloria gwandaensis (Preston, 1912)

== Succineidae ==
Common name: Amber snails

- Oxyloma patentissimum (L. Pfeiffer, 1853)
- Succinea arboricola Connolly, 1912
- Succinea badia Morelet, 1867
- Succinea striata Krauss, 1848

== Unionidae ==
Common name: Freshwater mussels

- Coelatura kunenensis (Mousson, 1888)
- Coelatura mossambicensis (E. von Martens, 1860)
- Unio caffer Krauss, 1848

== Veronicellidae ==
Common name: Leather-back land slugs

- Laevicaulis alte (A. Férussac, 1822)
- Laevicaulis natalensis (Krauss, 1848)

== Viviparidae ==
Common name: River snails

- Bellamya capillata (Frauenfeld, 1865)
