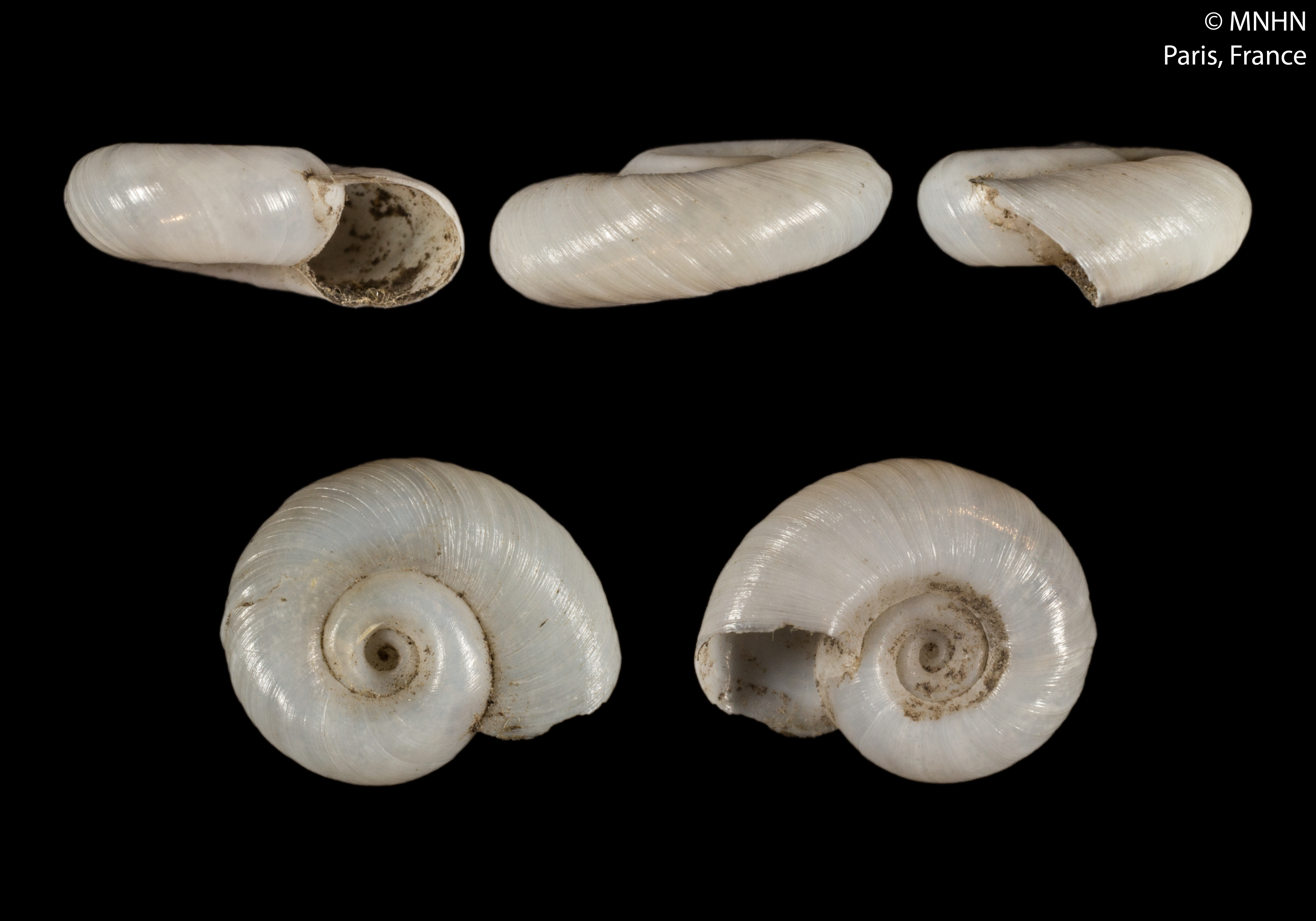
- Shell of Biomphalaria salinarum (syntype at MNHN, Paris)

Conservation status
- Data Deficient (IUCN 3.1)

Scientific classification
- Kingdom: Animalia
- Phylum: Mollusca
- Class: Gastropoda
- Superorder: Hygrophila
- Family: Planorbidae
- Genus: Biomphalaria
- Species: B. salinarum

Binomial name
- Biomphalaria salinarum (Morelet, 1868)

Synonyms
- Planorbis salinarum Morelet, 1868

= Biomphalaria salinarum =

Species of gastropod

Biomphalaria salinarum is a species of air-breathing freshwater snail, an aquatic pulmonate gastropod mollusc in the family Planorbidae, the ram's horn snails.

This is a taxon inquirendum.

== Distribution ==
This species is found in Angola, Botswana, Cameroon, Democratic Republic of the Congo, Namibia, and South Africa.
