= List of non-marine molluscs of Namibia =

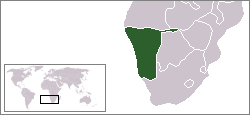
Location of Namibia

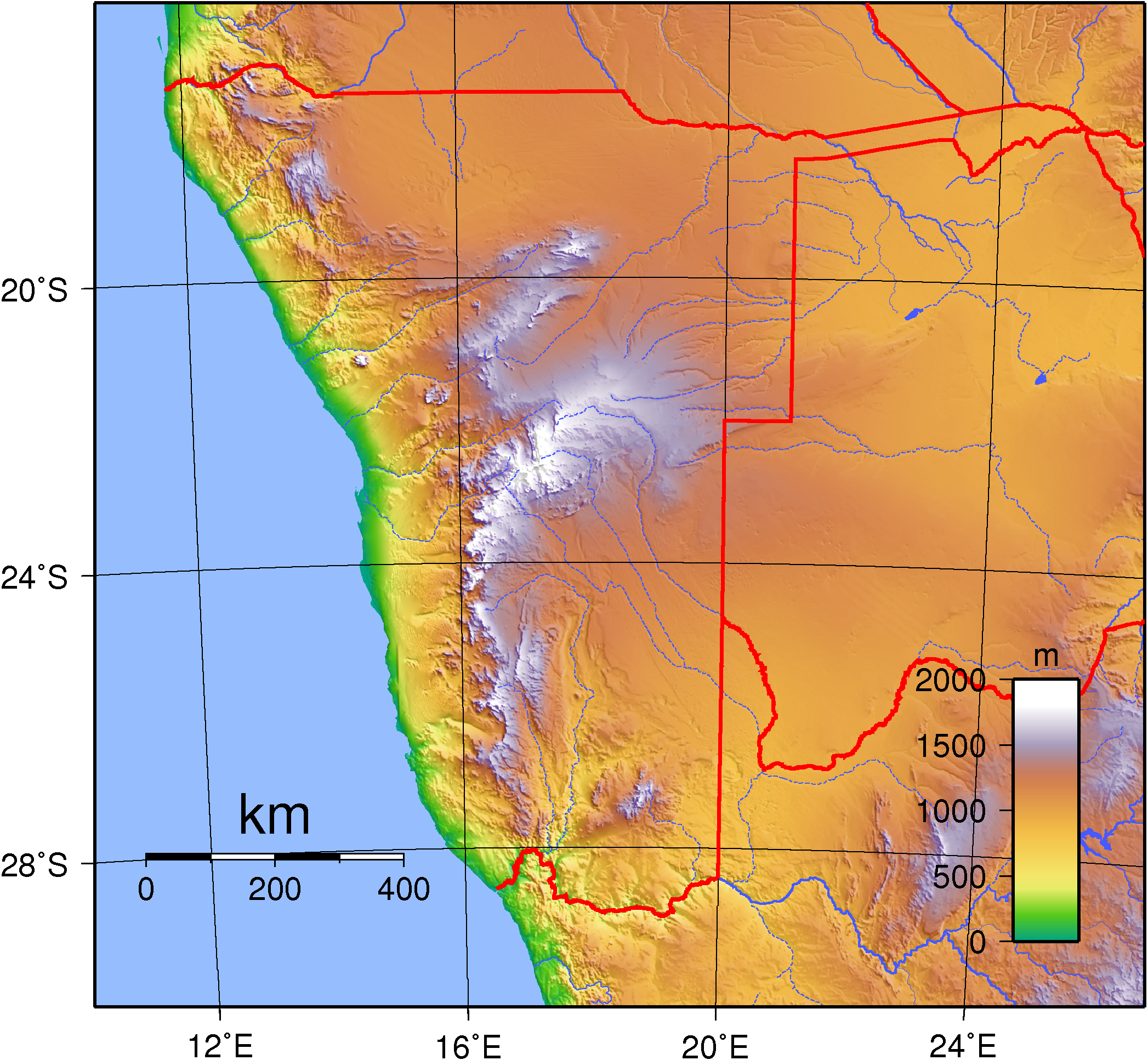
The topography of Namibia

A number of species of non-marine molluscs are found in the wild in Namibia.

There are no endemic species of freshwater molluscs in Namibia.

Summary table of number of species:
Class	Numbers of molluscs by habitat	Number of species
Gastropoda	Freshwater gastropods	26
Gastropoda	Land gastropods	??
Gastropoda	Total number of non-marine gastropods	??
Bivalvia	Freshwater bivalves	13
Bivalvia	Total number of non-marine molluscs	???

== Class: Gastropoda ==
=== Freshwater gastropods ===
Freshwater gastropods in Namibia include 26 species in 9 families:

Planorbidae

- Bulinus tropicus (Krauss, 1848)

=== Land gastropods ===
Land gastropods in Namibia include:

Agriolimacidae

- Deroceras laeve (O. F. Müller, 1774) - non-indigenous

Sculptariidae

- Sculptaria kaokoensis Zilch 1952
- Sculptaria namaquensis

Dorcasiidae

- Dorcasia alexandri Gray, 1838
- Dorcasia connollyi
- Dorcasia montana
- Trigonephrus haughtoni Connolly
- Trigonephrus ruficornis Serville 1838

Pupillidae

- Gibbulinopsis fontana
- Pupoides calaharicus

Subulinidae

- Xerocerastus minutus Zilch

Veronicellidae

- Laevicaulis alte (Férussac, 1821)

== Class: Bivalvia ==
=== Freshwater bivalves ===
Freshwater bivalves in Namibia include 13 species in 5 families:

== See also ==
- List of marine molluscs of Namibia

Lists of molluscs of surrounding countries:

- List of non-marine molluscs of Angola, Wildlife of Angola
- List of non-marine molluscs of Zambia, Wildlife of Zambia
- List of non-marine molluscs of Botswana, Wildlife of Botswana
- List of non-marine molluscs of South Africa, Wildlife of South Africa
