= Ceratophallus kisumiensis =

Conservation status
- Near Threatened (IUCN 3.1)

Scientific classification
- Kingdom: Animalia
- Phylum: Mollusca
- Class: Gastropoda
- Superorder: Hygrophila
- Family: Planorbidae
- Genus: Ceratophallus
- Species: C. kisumiensis

Binomial name
- Ceratophallus kisumiensis (Preston, 1912)

Species of mollusc

Ceratophallus kisumiensis is a species of freshwater air-breathing snails, aquatic pulmonate gastropod mollusks in the family Planorbidae, the ram's horn snails, or planorbids. All species in this genus have sinistral or left-coiling shells.

This species is found in Kenya, Tanzania, and Uganda. Its natural habitats are freshwater lakes and intermittent freshwater lakes.
