= Ceratophallus socotrensis =

Conservation status
- Data Deficient (IUCN 3.1)

Scientific classification
- Kingdom: Animalia
- Phylum: Mollusca
- Class: Gastropoda
- Superorder: Hygrophila
- Family: Planorbidae
- Genus: Ceratophallus
- Species: C. socotrensis

Binomial name
- Ceratophallus socotrensis (Godwin-Austen, 1883)

Species of gastropod

Ceratophallus socotrensis is a species of freshwater air-breathing snails, aquatic pulmonate gastropod mollusks in the family Planorbidae, the ram's horn snails, or planorbids. The snails in this species have sinistral or left-coiling shells. This species is endemic to Socotra, Yemen.
