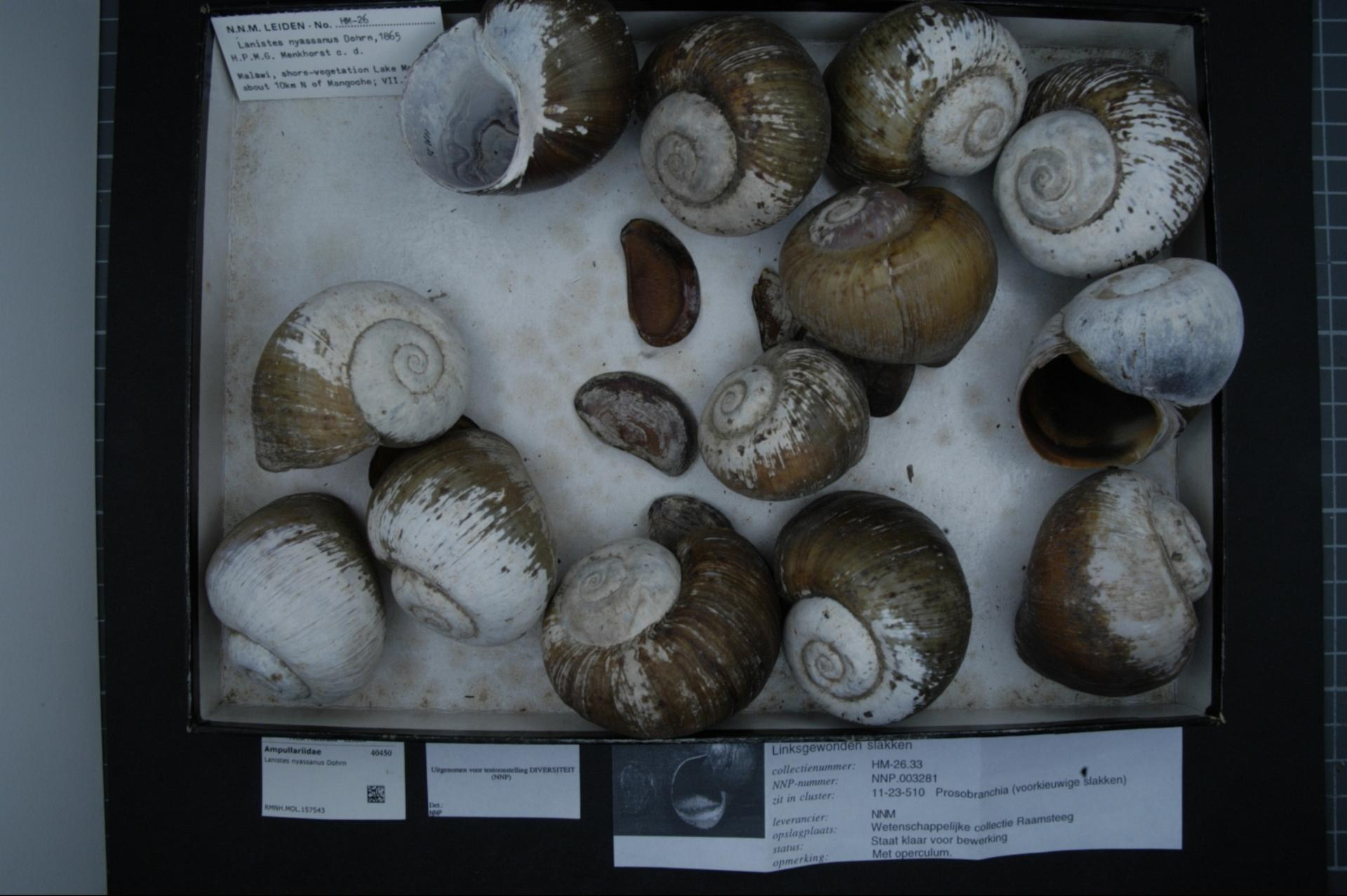
- L. nyassanus exhibit at the Naturalis Biodiversity Center

Conservation status
- Vulnerable (IUCN 3.1)

Scientific classification
- Kingdom: Animalia
- Phylum: Mollusca
- Class: Gastropoda
- Subclass: Caenogastropoda
- Order: Architaenioglossa
- Family: Ampullariidae
- Genus: Lanistes
- Species: L. nyassanus

Binomial name
- Lanistes nyassanus Dohrn, 1865

= Lanistes nyassanus =

Species of gastropod

Lanistes nyassanus is a species of large freshwater snail, an aquatic gastropod mollusk with a gill and an operculum in the family Ampullariidae, the apple snails. The shell of this species is unusual in that it has left-handed shell-coiling.

The specific name nyassanus is derived from the type locality of the species, Lake Nyassa.

== Distribution ==
Lanistes nyassanus is found in Malawi and Mozambique. Found in sand and weeds, it is common at 1.5 meters depth, but some have been found as deep as 35 meters.

The type locality is the southern end of Lake Nyassa.

== Description ==
The width of the shell is 75 mm; the height of the shell is 68 mm.

== Behavior ==
These snails burrow into sand to hide from fish.
