= Dlinza Forest pinwheel =

Conservation status
- Critically Endangered (IUCN 3.1)

Scientific classification
- Kingdom: Animalia
- Phylum: Mollusca
- Class: Gastropoda
- Order: Stylommatophora
- Family: Charopidae
- Genus: Trachycystis
- Species: T. clifdeni

Binomial name
- Trachycystis clifdeni Connolly, 1932

Species of gastropod

The Dlinza Forest pinwheel (Trachycystis clifdeni) is a species of very small, air-breathing, land snail, a terrestrial pulmonate gastropod mollusc in the family Charopidae.

This species is endemic to South Africa. Its natural habitat is subtropical or tropical dry forests. The common name is a reference to the Dlinza Forest Nature Reserve.
