= Hirthia globosa =

Conservation status
- Least Concern (IUCN 3.1)

Scientific classification
- Kingdom: Animalia
- Phylum: Mollusca
- Class: Gastropoda
- Subclass: Caenogastropoda
- Family: Paludomidae
- Genus: Hirthia
- Species: H. globosa

Binomial name
- Hirthia globosa Ancey, 1898

Species of gastropod

Hirthia globosa is a species of tropical freshwater snails with an operculum, aquatic gastropod mollusks in the family Paludomidae.

This species is found in Burundi, the Democratic Republic of the Congo, Tanzania, and Zambia. Its natural habitat is freshwater lakes.
