= Trachycystis (gastropod) =

Scientific classification
- Domain: Eukaryota
- Kingdom: Animalia
- Phylum: Mollusca
- Class: Gastropoda
- Order: Stylommatophora
- Family: Charopidae
- Subfamily: Trachycystinae
- Genus: Trachycystis

Type species
- Helix bisculpta Benson, 1851

Synonyms
- Helix (Pella) E. von Martens, 1860; Helix (Trachycystis) Pilsbry, 1893; Pella E. von Martens, 1860

Genus of gastropods

Trachycystis is a genus of small air-breathing land snails, terrestrial pulmonate gastropod molluscs in the family Charopidae.

== Species ==
Species within the genus Trachycystis include:

- Trachycystis abyssinica (Jickeli, 1874)
- Trachycystis bathycoele (Melvill & Ponsonby, 1892)
- Trachycystis bernardinae Connolly, 1925
- Trachycystis bifoveata Connolly, 1932
- Trachycystis bisculpta (Benson, 1851)
- Trachycystis chancogneae Pickford, 2019
- Trachycystis clifdeni Connolly, 1932 (vernacular name: Dlinza Forest pinwheel)
- Trachycystis colorama
- Trachycystis contabulata Connolly, 1932
- Trachycystis contrasta Sirgel, 1980
- Trachycystis crudieri Fischer-Piette, Blanc, C.P., F.Blanc & Salvat, 1994
- Trachycystis falconi Connolly, 1939
- Trachycystis felina Connolly, 1932
- Trachycystis ferarum Connolly, 1932
- Trachycystis fossula Connolly, 1925
- Trachycystis franzi Blume, 1959
- Trachycystis gemmascabra Connolly, 1939
- Trachycystis glanvilliana (Ancey, 1890)
- Trachycystis glebaria Melvill & Ponsonby, 1903
- Trachycystis haygarthi (Melvill & Ponsonby, 1899)
- Trachycystis hoperni Fischer-Piette, Blanc, C.P., F.Blanc & Salvat, 1994
- Trachycystis igembiensis Connolly, 1925
- Trachycystis iredalei Preston, 1912
- Trachycystis jucunda Connolly, 1929
- Trachycystis kermadeci Fischer-Piette, Blanc, C.P., F.Blanc & Salvat, 1994
- Trachycystis kincaidi Connolly, 1932
- Trachycystis lamellifera (E.A.Smith, 1903)
- Trachycystis lamellosa K.L.Pfeiffer, 1952
- Trachycystis langi van Bruggen, 1994
- Trachycystis laticostata Melvill & Ponsonby, 1903
- Trachycystis legetetana Pickford, 2019
- Trachycystis leucocarina Sirgel, 1980
- Trachycystis liricostata (Melvill & Ponsonby, 1891)
- Trachycystis lunaris Connolly, 1939
- Trachycystis marcelini Fischer-Piette, Blanc, C.P., F.Blanc & Salvat, 1994
- Trachycystis masina Emberton & Griffiths, 2009
- Trachycystis mcbeani Connolly, 1932
- Trachycystis mcdowelli Connolly, 1922
- Trachycystis mediocris Connolly, 1939
- Trachycystis microscopica (F.Krauss, 1848)
- Trachycystis montissalinarum van Bruggen, 2002
- Trachycystis palaeokempi Pickford, 2019
- Trachycystis patera Melvill & Ponsonby, 1903
- Trachycystis placenta (Melvill & Ponsonby, 1899)
- Trachycystis proxima Connolly, 1939
- Trachycystis pura Connolly, 1922
- Trachycystis rariplicata (L.Pfeiffer, 1849)
- Trachycystis rivularis (F.Krauss, 1848)
- Trachycystis rubra Connolly, 1925
- Trachycystis rudicostata Connolly, 1922
- Trachycystis sabuletorum (Benson, 1851)
- Trachycystis somersetensis (Melvill & Ponsonby, 1893)
- Trachycystis soror Connolly, 1922
- Trachycystis subpinguis Connolly, 1922
- Trachycystis teretiuscula Melvill & Ponsonby, 1897
- Trachycystis tollini (Benson, 1856)
- Trachycystis ulrichi Fischer-Piette, Blanc, C.P., F.Blanc & Salvat, 1994
- Trachycystis venatorum Connolly, 1932
- Trachycystis vengoensis Connolly, 1922
- Trachycystis waterloti Fischer-Piette, Blanc, C.P., F.Blanc & Salvat, 1994
- Trachycystis wilmattae Pilsbry & Cockerell, 1933
