= Lanistes solidus =

Conservation status
- Near Threatened (IUCN 3.1)

Scientific classification
- Kingdom: Animalia
- Phylum: Mollusca
- Class: Gastropoda
- Subclass: Caenogastropoda
- Order: Architaenioglossa
- Family: Ampullariidae
- Genus: Lanistes
- Species: L. solidus

Binomial name
- Lanistes solidus E. A. Smith, 1878

Species of gastropod

Lanistes solidus is a species of large freshwater snail, an aquatic gastropod mollusk with a gill and an operculum in the family Ampullariidae, the apple snails.

== Distribution ==
It is found in Malawi and Mozambique.
