= Hirthia littorina =

Conservation status
- Endangered (IUCN 3.1)

Scientific classification
- Kingdom: Animalia
- Phylum: Mollusca
- Class: Gastropoda
- Subclass: Caenogastropoda
- Family: Paludomidae
- Genus: Hirthia
- Species: H. littorina

Binomial name
- Hirthia littorina Ancey, 1898

Species of gastropod

Hirthia littorina is a species of tropical freshwater snails with an operculum, aquatic gastropod mollusks in the family Paludomidae.

This species is found in Burundi, the Democratic Republic of the Congo, Tanzania and Zambia.
