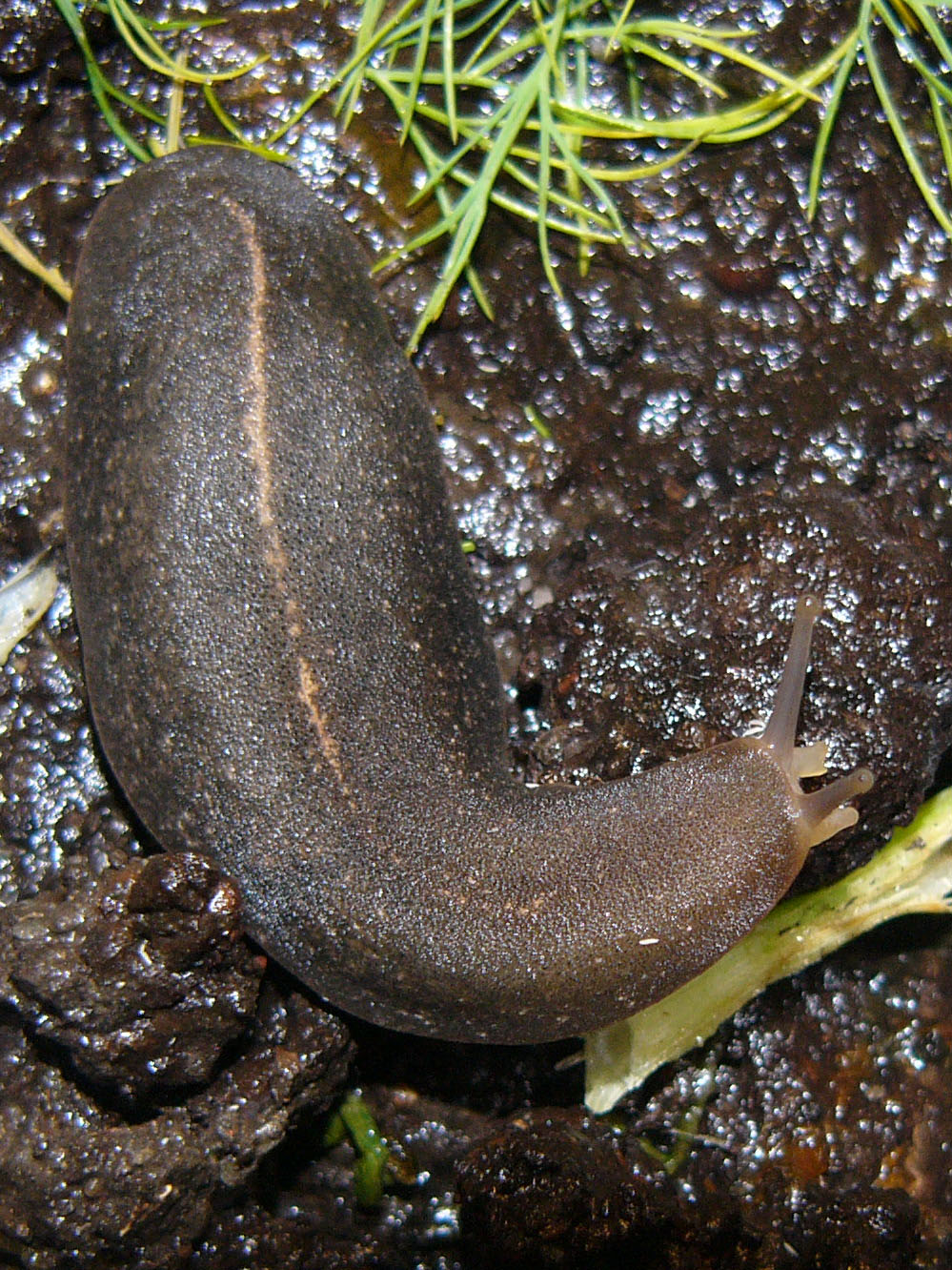

Conservation status
- Secure (NatureServe)

Scientific classification
- Kingdom: Animalia
- Phylum: Mollusca
- Class: Gastropoda
- Order: Systellommatophora
- Family: Veronicellidae
- Genus: Laevicaulis
- Species: L. alte

Binomial name
- Laevicaulis alte Férussac, 1822)

Synonyms
- Eleutherocaulis alte (Férussac, 1822); Filicaulis alte (Férussac, 1822); Filicaulis frauenfeldi (Semper, 1885); Laevicaulis maillardi (P.Fischer, 1871); Meisenheimeria alte (Férussac, 1822); Vaginula bocagei (Simroth, 1893); Vaginula brevis (P.Fischer, 1871); Vaginula elegans (Semper, 1885); Vaginula frauenfeldi (Semper, 1885); Vaginula leydigi (Simroth, 1889); Vaginula leydigi var. celebensis (Simroth, 1918); Vaginula leydigi var. keyana (Simroth, 1918); Vaginula maculosa (Hasselt, 1830); Vaginula maillardi (P.Fischer, 1871); Vaginulus alte (Férussac, 1822); Vaginulus petersi (E.von Martens, 1879); Veronicella petersi (E.von Martens, 1879); Veronicella willeyi (Collinge, 1900)

= Laevicaulis alte =

Species of gastropod

Laevicaulis alte, or the tropical leatherleaf, is a species of tropical land slug, a terrestrial pulmonate gastropod mollusk in the family Veronicellidae, the leatherleaf slugs.

== Description ==
Laevicaulis alte is a round, dark-coloured slug with no shell, 7 or 8 cm (2.8 or 3.1 in) long. Its skin is slightly tuberculated. The central keel is beige in colour.

This slug has a unique, very narrow foot; juvenile specimens have a foot 1 mm (0.039 in) wide and adult specimens have a foot that is only 4 or 5 mm (0.16 or 0.20 in) wide.

The tentacles are small, 2 or 3 mm (0.079 or 0.118 in) long, and they are only rarely extended beyond the edge of the mantle.

== Parasites ==
This slug is an intermediate host for Angiostrongylus cantonensis, the rat lungworm, a round worm, the most common cause of eosinophilic meningoencephalitis.

== Predators ==
Laevicaulis alte is eaten by the frog Rana tigrina.

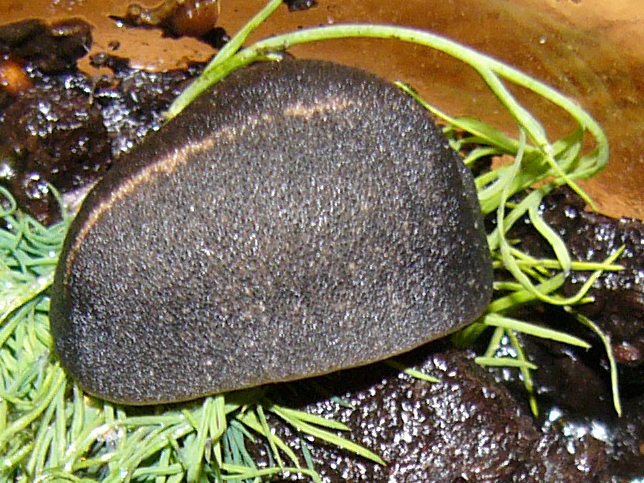
View of contracted individual, the anterior (front) end is to the right

== Distribution ==
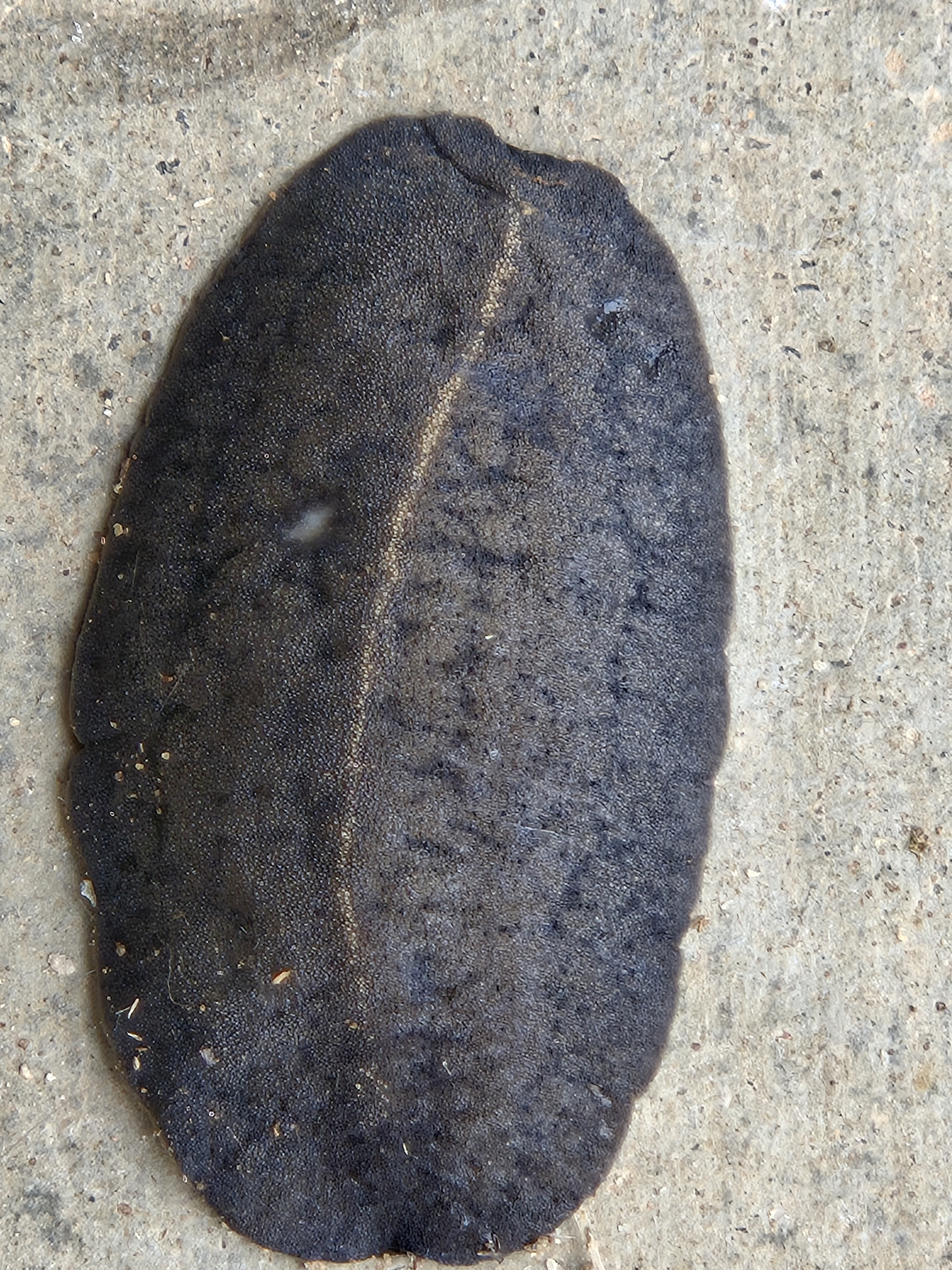
Tropical leather leaf slug (Laevicaulis alte) seen in Ujire, Karnataka

The species is probably indigenous to sub-Saharan Africa, including Tanzania, Botswana and South Africa

It has been introduced and has become an invasive species in the following areas:

- Southern Asia
- Taiwan
- China
- Ryukyu Islands, Japan
- United States (Hawaii)
- Islands in the Indian Ocean
- Australia (since 1889)
- Samoa

The species is already established in the USA, and is considered to represent a potentially serious threat as a pest, an invasive species which could negatively affect agriculture, natural ecosystems, human health or commerce. Therefore, it has been suggested that this species be given top national quarantine significance in the USA.

== Habitat ==
Laevicaulis alte lives in dry areas, mostly at lower altitudes.

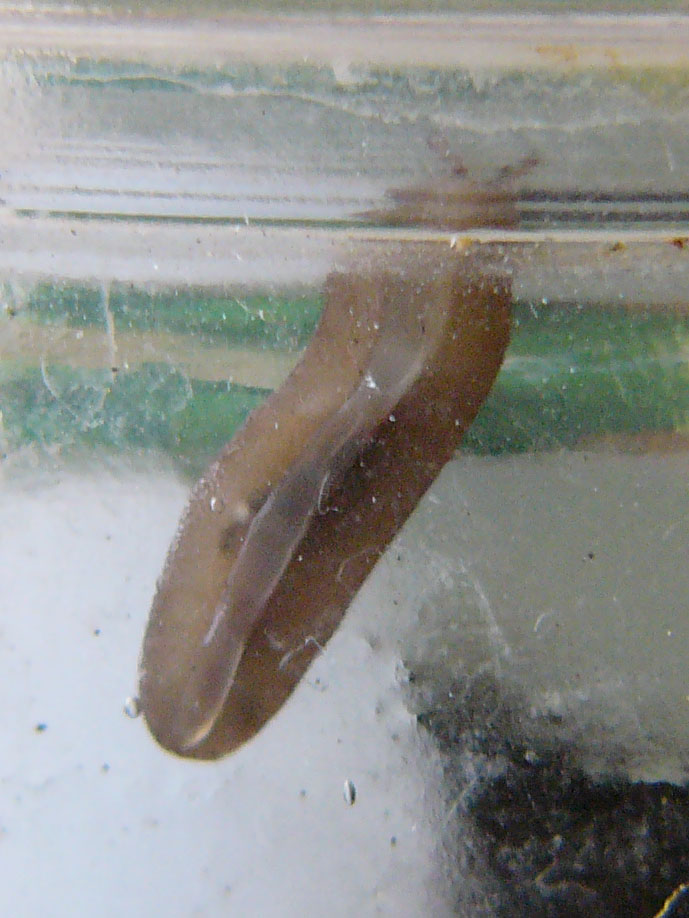
Ventral view of foot of juvenile specimen

== Life cycle ==
The slug hatches from eggs. Laevicaulis alte has several adaptations for living in dry conditions: a rounded shape with as small as possible surface area, and a narrow foot to reduce evaporation.

Juvenile specimens search for food nearly always at night, and stay buried in the soil during the day. Larger specimens are active during the day sometimes. The slug can grow up from 0.5 cm (0.20 in) to approximately 4 cm (1.6 in) in length in 7 months.
