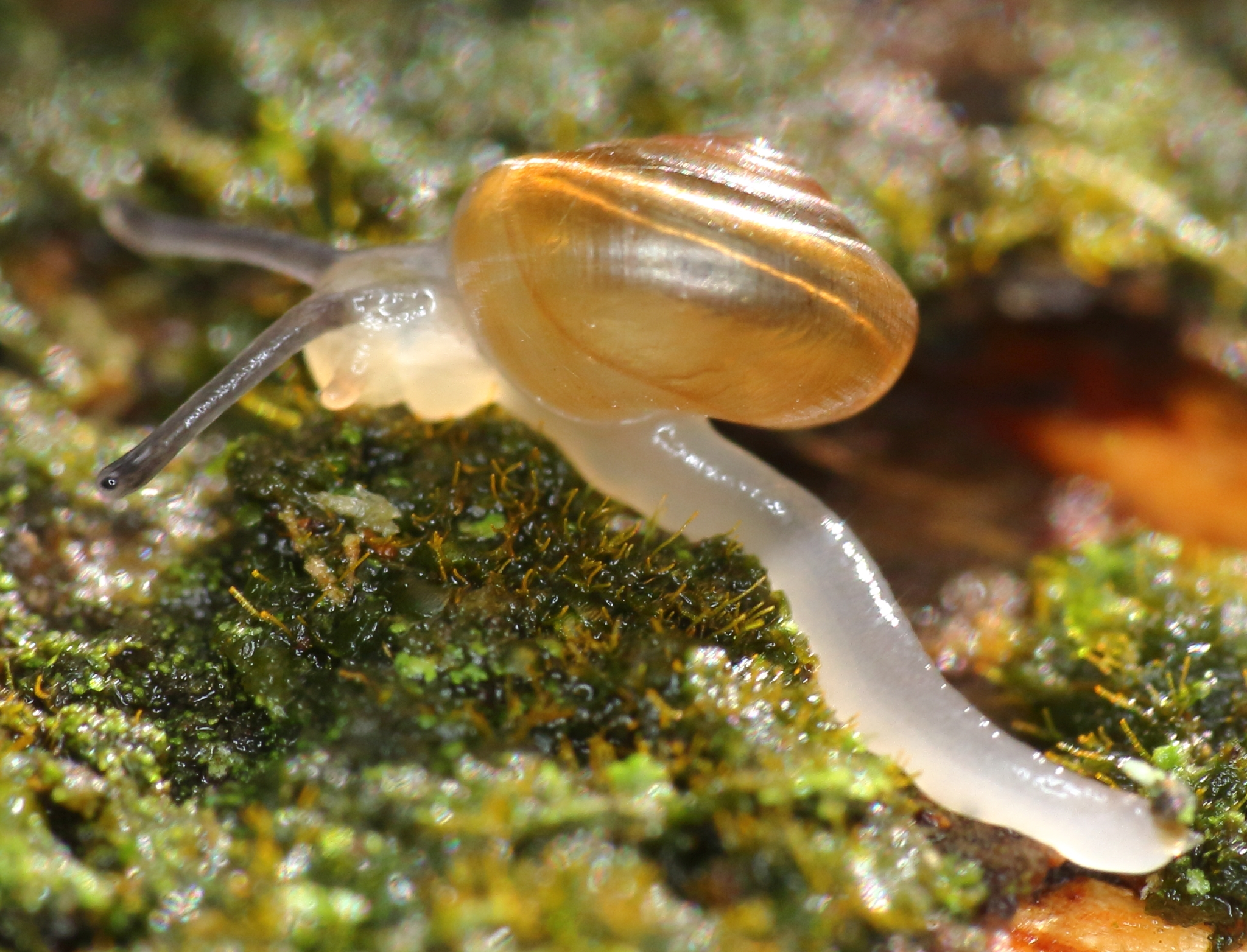
- Trachycystis subpinguis in KwaZulu-Natal, South Africa

Scientific classification
- Kingdom: Animalia
- Phylum: Mollusca
- Class: Gastropoda
- Order: Stylommatophora
- Family: Charopidae
- Genus: Trachycystis
- Species: T. subpinguis

Binomial name
- Trachycystis subpinguis Connolly, 1922

= Trachycystis subpinguis =

Species of gastropod

Trachycystis subpinguis is a species of small, air-breathing, land snail in the family Charopidae.

This species is endemic to southern Africa. Its natural habitat is subtropical and Afromontane forest, where it may be found on the bark of trees in wet weather.
