= Trachycystis haygarthi =

Conservation status
- Endangered (IUCN 3.1)

Scientific classification
- Kingdom: Animalia
- Phylum: Mollusca
- Class: Gastropoda
- Order: Stylommatophora
- Family: Charopidae
- Genus: Trachycystis
- Species: T. haygarthi

Binomial name
- Trachycystis haygarthi (Melvill & John Henry Ponsonby-Fane, 1899)

Species of gastropod

Trachycystis haygarthi is a species of very small, air-breathing, land snail, a terrestrial pulmonate gastropod mollusc in the family Charopidae.

This species is endemic to South Africa. Its natural habitats are subtropical or tropical dry forests and subtropical or tropical moist lowland forests. It is threatened by habitat loss.
