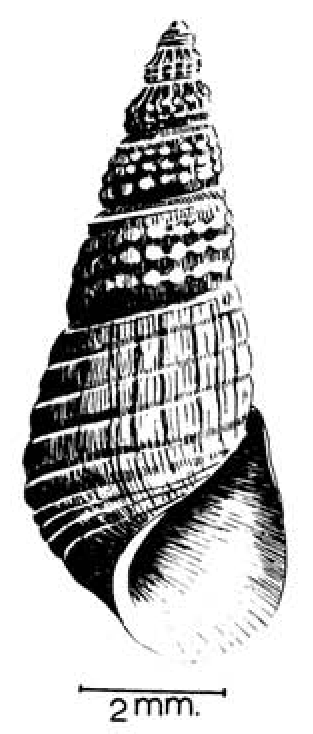
- apertural view of a shell of Melanoides victoriae

Scientific classification
- Domain: Eukaryota
- Kingdom: Animalia
- Phylum: Mollusca
- Class: Gastropoda
- Subclass: Caenogastropoda
- Family: Thiaridae
- Genus: Melanoides
- Species: M. victoriae

Binomial name
- Melanoides victoriae (Dohrn, 1865)

Synonyms
- Melania victoriae Dohrn, 1865

= Melanoides victoriae =

Species of gastropod

Melanoides victoriae is a species of a freshwater snail, a gastropod in the Thiaridae family.

== Distribution ==
The type locality is "the rapids above the Victoria Falls of the Zambezi", Zambezi River at Victoria Falls, Zimbabwe.

Melanoides victoriae is endemic to Southern Africa, and the species distribution includes:

- Botswana
- South Africa
- Zambezi River, Zimbabwe
- East Caprivi and Okavango River in north-eastern Namibia
- Cunene River

== Description ==
The width of the shell is 10 mm. The height of the shell is 29 mm.
