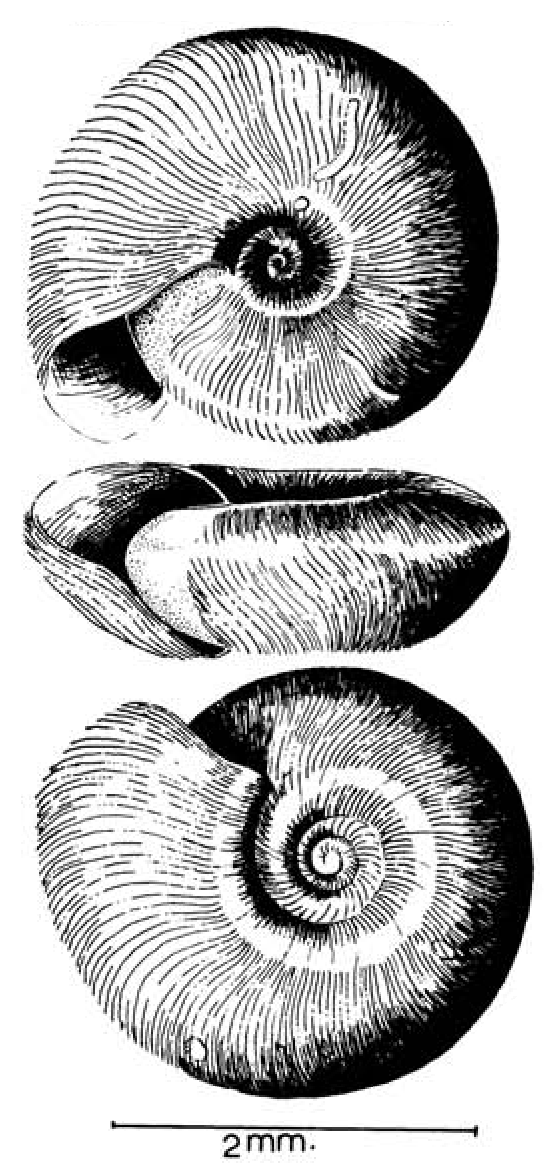
- Drawing of apical, apertural and umbilical view of the shell of Lentorbis carringtoni

Conservation status
- Least Concern (IUCN 3.1)

Scientific classification
- Kingdom: Animalia
- Phylum: Mollusca
- Class: Gastropoda
- Superorder: Hygrophila
- Family: Planorbidae
- Genus: Lentorbis
- Species: L. carringtoni

Binomial name
- Lentorbis carringtoni (de Azevedo et al., 1961)

Synonyms
- Segmentorbis carringtoni de Azevedo et al., 1961

= Lentorbis carringtoni =

Species of gastropod

Lentorbis carringtoni is a species of air-breathing freshwater snail, aquatic pulmonate gastropod mollusk in the family Planorbidae, the ram's horn snails.

== Distribution ==
Distribution of Lentorbis carringtoni include Malawi, Mozambique and South Africa.

== Description ==
All species within family Planorbidae have sinistral shells.

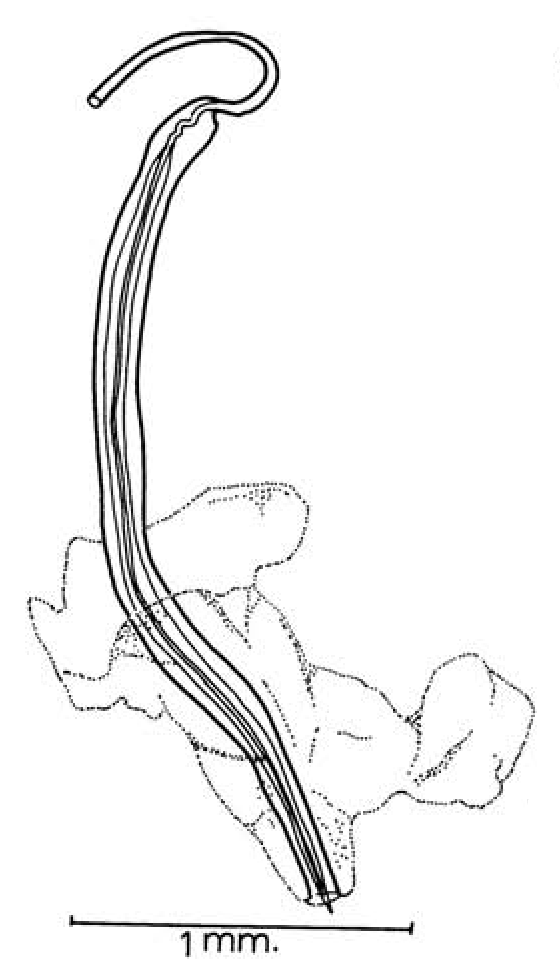
Drawing of everted copulatory organ of Lentorbis carringtoni
