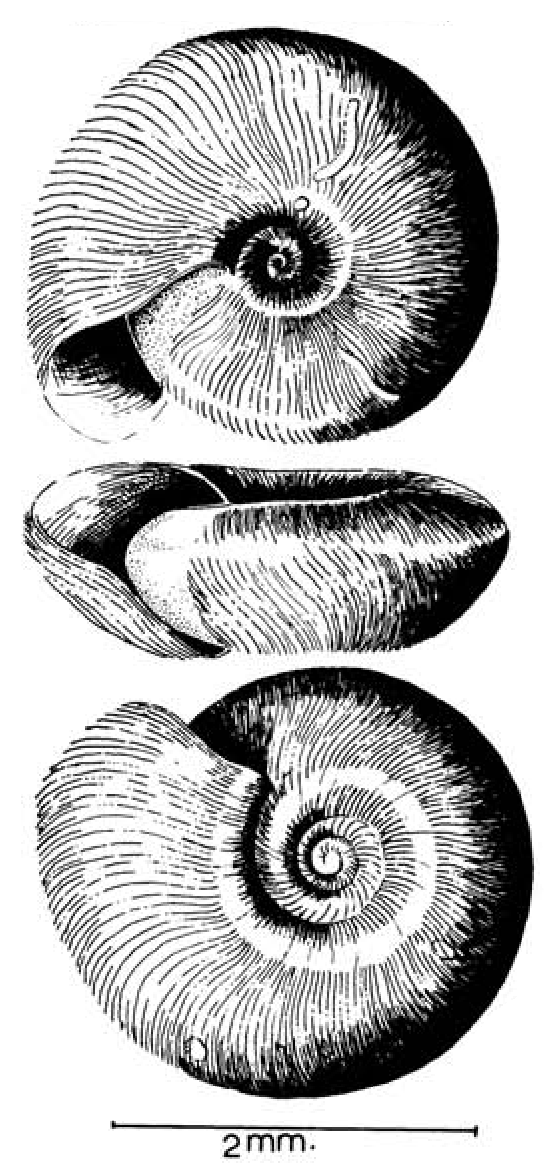
- Drawing of apical, apertural and umbilical view of the shell of Lentorbis carringtoni

Scientific classification
- Kingdom: Animalia
- Phylum: Mollusca
- Class: Gastropoda
- Superorder: Hygrophila
- Family: Planorbidae
- Genus: Lentorbis; Mandahl-Barth, 1954

= Lentorbis =

Genus of gastropods

Lentorbis is a genus of air-breathing freshwater snails, aquatic pulmonate gastropod mollusks in the family Planorbidae, the ram's horn snails.

All species within family Planorbidae have sinistral shells.

== Distribution ==
This genus lives in Africa.

== Species ==
Species within this genus include:

- Lentorbis benguelensis (Dunker, 1845)
- Lentorbis carringtoni (de Azevedo et al., 1961)
- Lentorbis junodi (Connolly, 1922)
