= Hirthia =

Scientific classification
- Kingdom: Animalia
- Phylum: Mollusca
- Class: Gastropoda
- Subclass: Caenogastropoda
- Family: Paludomidae
- Genus: Hirthia; Ancey, 1898

Genus of gastropods

Hirthia is a genus of tropical freshwater snails with an operculum, aquatic gastropod mollusks in the family Paludomidae.

== Species ==
Species within the genus Hirthia include:

- Hirthia globosa Ancey, 1898
- Hirthia littorina Ancey, 1898
