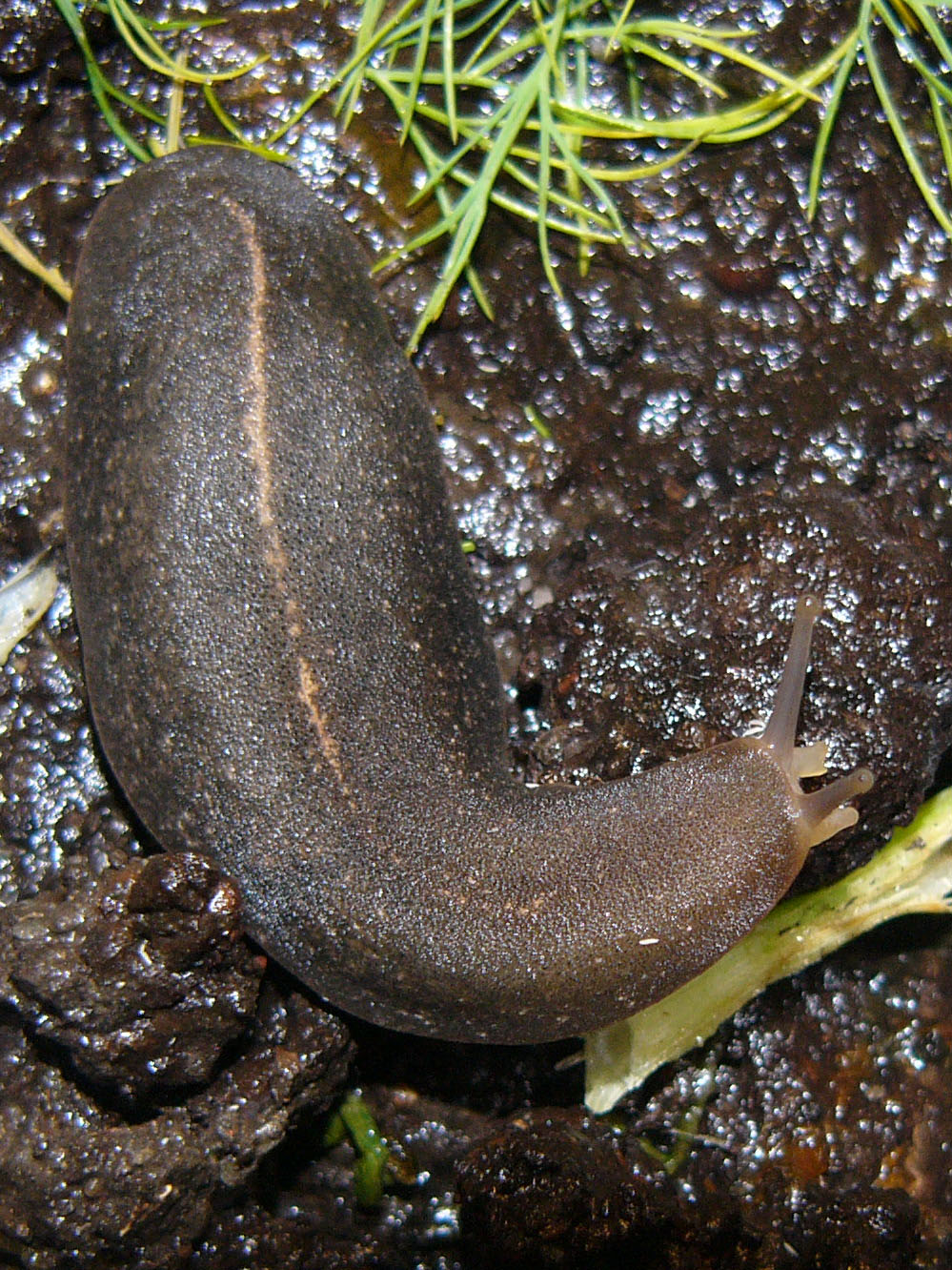
- Laevicaulis alte

Scientific classification
- Kingdom: Animalia
- Phylum: Mollusca
- Class: Gastropoda
- Order: Systellommatophora
- Family: Veronicellidae
- Genus: Laevicaulis; Simroth, 1913

Type species
- Vaginula comorensis P. Fischer, 1883

Species
- See text

Synonyms
- Annulicaulis Simroth, 1913 (junior synonym); Eleutherocaulis Simroth, 1913 (objective synonym); Filicaulis (Eleutherocaulis) Simroth, 1913; Meisenheimeria Grimpe & Hoffmann, 1924 (junior synonym); Vaginula (Annulicaulis) Simroth, 1913 (junior synonym); Vaginula (Eleutherocaulis) Simroth, 1913; Vaginula (Laevicaulis) Simroth, 1913

= Laevicaulis =

Genus of gastropods

Laevicaulis is a taxonomic genus of air-breathing, tropical land slugs, terrestrial pulmonate gastropod mollusks in the family Veronicellidae, the leatherleaf slugs.

== Species ==
Species within the genus Laevicaulis include:

- Laevicaulis alte (Férussac, 1822)
- Laevicaulis giganteus (Godwin-Austen, 1895)
- Laevicaulis haroldi (Collinge, 1901)
- Laevicaulis natalensis (F. Krauss, 1848)
- Laevicaulis somalicus (Colosi, 1927)
- Laevicaulis striatus (Simroth, 1896)
- Laevicaulis stuhlmanni (Simroth, 1895)
- Laevicaulis vosseleri (Simroth, 1913)
- Laevicaulis zanzibaricus Forcart, 1953

Species brought into synonymy

- Laevicaulis comorensis (P. Fischer, 1883): synonym of Laevicaulis alte (Férussac, 1822) (junior synonym)
- Laevicaulis maillardi (P. Fischer, 1871): synonym of Laevicaulis alte (Férussac, 1822) (junior synonym)
- Laevicaulis saxicolus (Cockerell, 1893): synonym of Laevicaulis natalensis natalensis (F. Krauss, 1848) (junior synonym)
