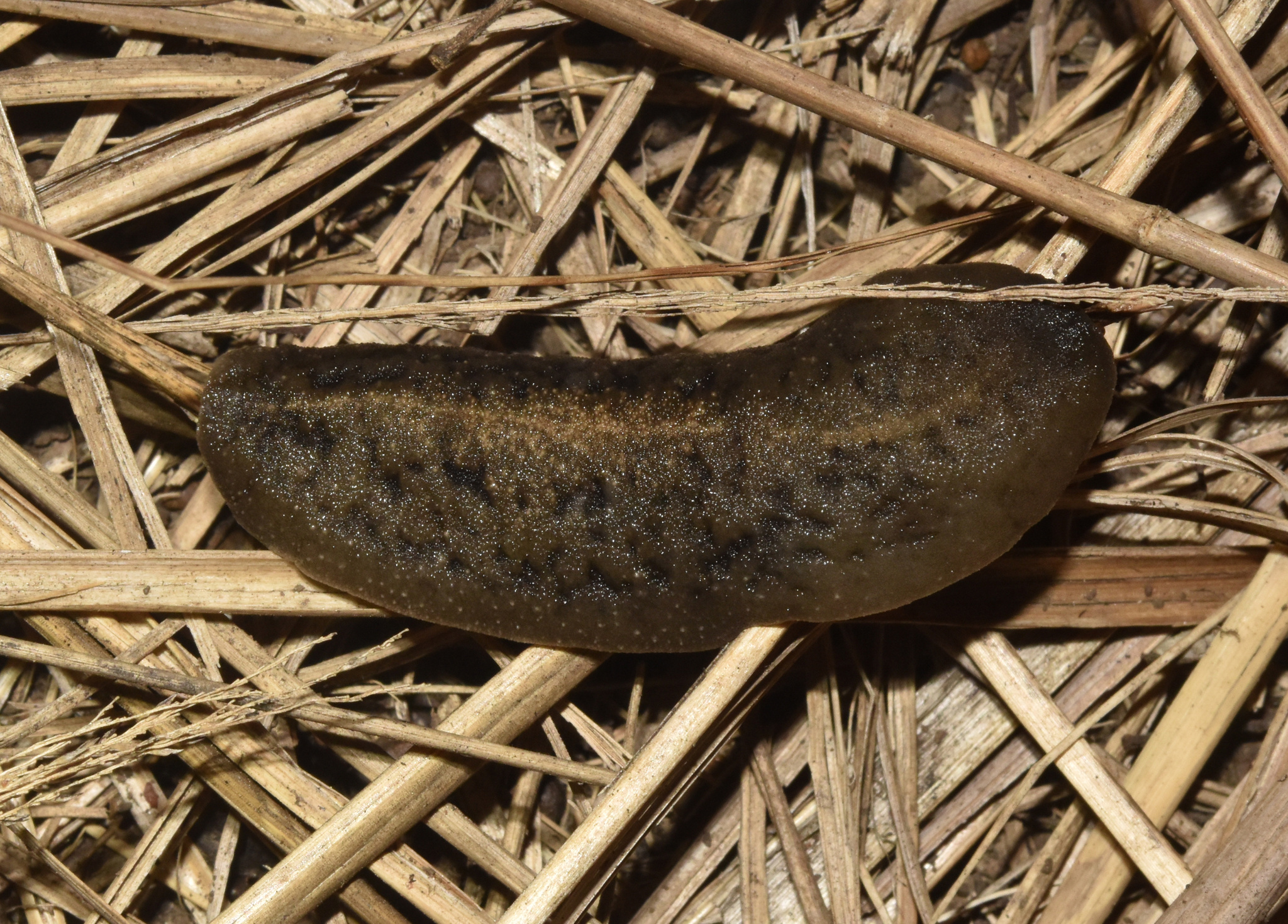

Scientific classification
- Kingdom: Animalia
- Phylum: Mollusca
- Class: Gastropoda
- Order: Systellommatophora
- Family: Veronicellidae
- Genus: Laevicaulis
- Species: L. natalensis

Binomial name
- Laevicaulis natalensis (F. Krauss, 1848)

Synonyms
- Eleutherocaulis natalensis Krauss, 1848); Vaginula natalensis (Krauss, 1848) superseded combination; Vaginulus natalensis Krauss, 1848 (original combination); Veronicella natalensis (Krauss, 1848) superseded combination

= Laevicaulis natalensis =

Slug endemic to Southern Africa

Laevicaulis natalensis, the brown leatherback slug, is a species of leatherleaf slug in the family Veronicellidae. This species is endemic to Southern Africa.

== Taxonomy ==
Laevicaulis natalensis contains the following subspecies:

- Laevicaulis natalensis brauni
- Laevicaulis natalensis natalensis

== Description ==
The body is elongated-oblong, convex, and subcylindrical. It is coloured white-ashy and very finely punctate (covered with minute dots). The foot is transversely striate (marked with cross-wise lines), cut off squarely in front, and produced posteriorly into a pointed tail that is longer than the mantle. The tentacles are simple. The ocular tentacles are transversely striate. The labial tentacles (those near the mouth) are broader, blunt and twice as long as the ocular tentacles. (Note: Original description in Latin)

== Distribution ==
This species is endemic to Southern Africa.
