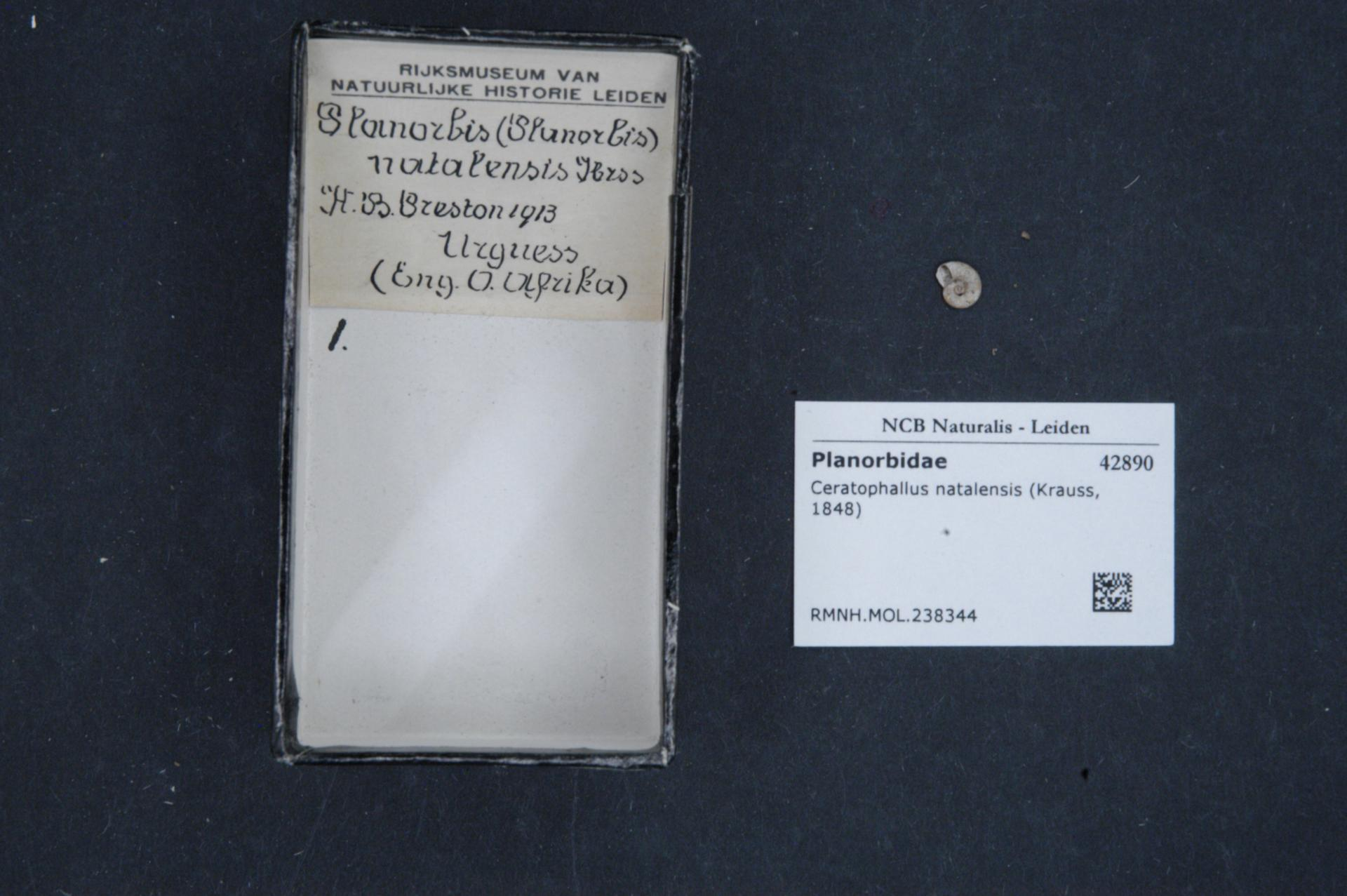

Scientific classification
- Kingdom: Animalia
- Phylum: Mollusca
- Class: Gastropoda
- Superorder: Hygrophila
- Family: Planorbidae
- Genus: Afrogyrorbis
- Species: A. natalensis

Binomial name
- Afrogyrorbis natalensis (Krauss, 1848)

Synonyms
- Anisus natalensis (Krauss, 1848); Ceratophallus natalensis (Krauss, 1848); Planorbis crawfordi Melvill & Ponsonby, 1903; Planorbis leuchochilus Melvill & Ponsonby, 1903; Planorbis natalensis Krauss, 1848; Planorbis sperabilis Preston, 1912

= Afrogyrorbis natalensis =

Species of gastropod

Afrogyrorbis natalensis is a species of gastropod belonging to the family Planorbidae. The species is found in Africa, specifically in South Africa and Mozambique.
