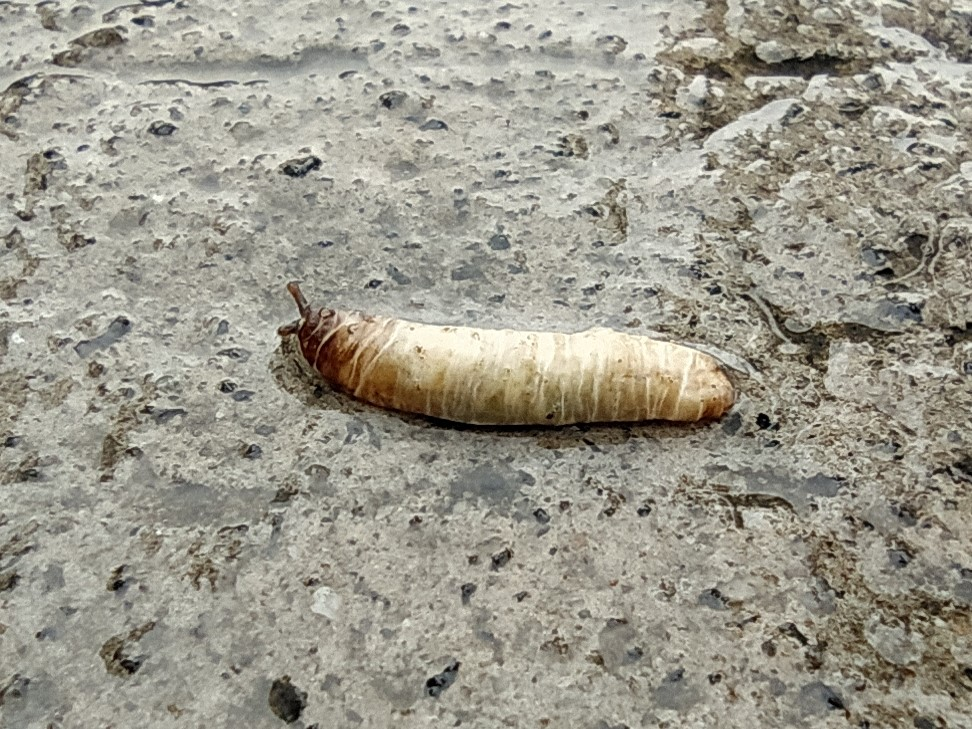

Conservation status
- Endangered (IUCN 2.3)

Scientific classification
- Kingdom: Animalia
- Phylum: Mollusca
- Class: Gastropoda
- Order: Systellommatophora
- Family: Veronicellidae
- Genus: Eleutherocaulis
- Species: E. haroldi

Binomial name
- Eleutherocaulis haroldi (Dundee, 1980)

Synonyms
- Laevicaulis haroldi (Dundee, 1980)

= Eleutherocaulis haroldi =

Species of gastropod

Eleutherocaulis haroldi, the caterpillar slug, is a species of tropical land slug in the family Veronicellidae, the leatherleaf slugs. It was first formally named Laevicaulis haroldi in 1980.

== Distribution ==
Eleutherocaulis haroldi is native to South Africa.

As a invasive species:

Taiwan

It has been introduced accidentally in India and is becoming an invasive pest. The species was first reported feeding and causing damage to Mulberry plants in Maharashtra. It is speculated to have reached India through various airports and international trade.

== Conservation status ==
In its home range in South Africa, Eleutherocaulis haroldi is endangered; it is threatened by habitat loss.
