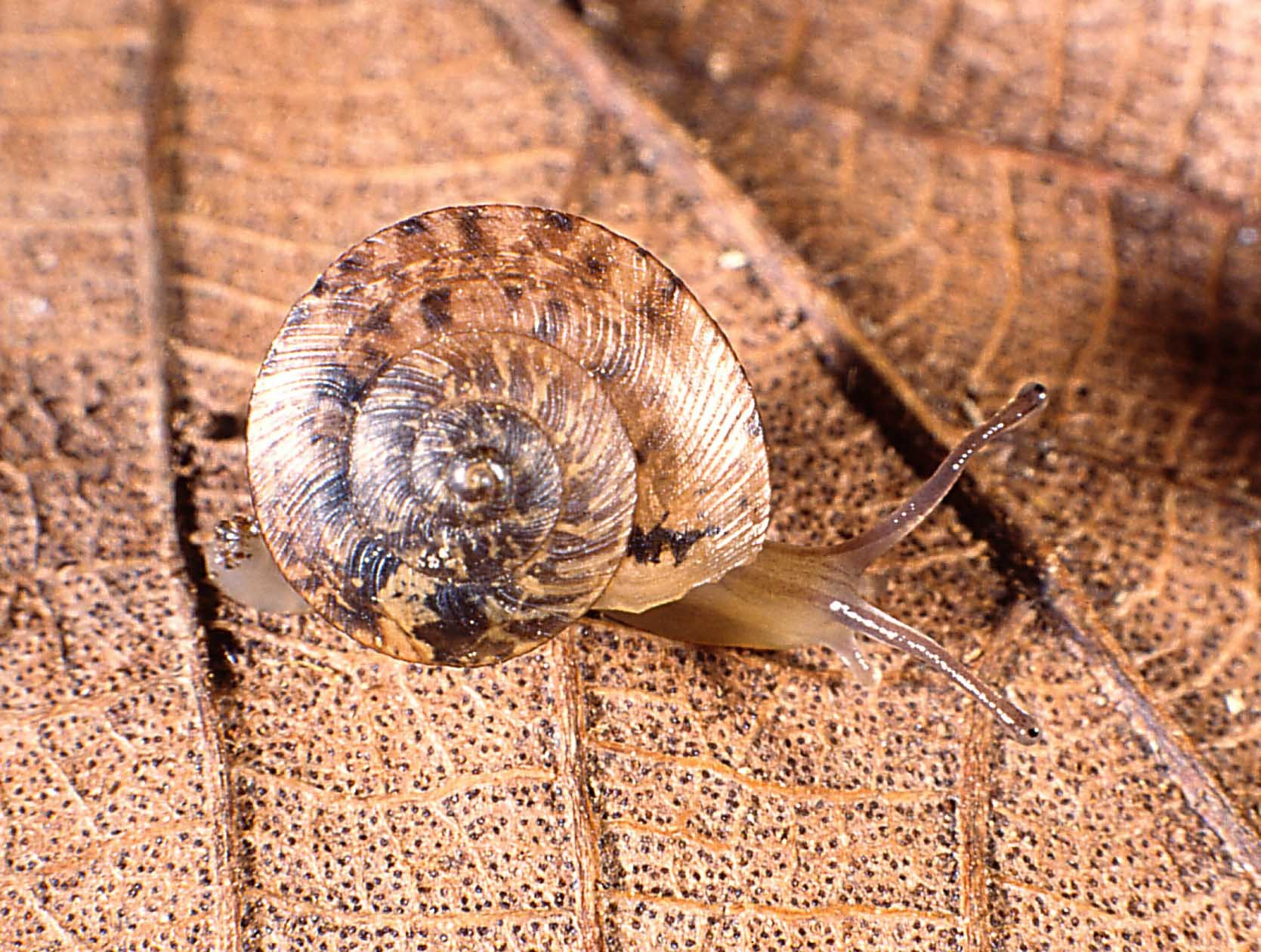
- T. placenta in KwaZulu-Natal, South Africa

Conservation status
- Critically Endangered (IUCN 3.1)

Scientific classification
- Kingdom: Animalia
- Phylum: Mollusca
- Class: Gastropoda
- Order: Stylommatophora
- Family: Charopidae
- Genus: Trachycystis
- Species: T. placenta

Binomial name
- Trachycystis placenta (Melvill & Ponsonby, 1899)

= Trachycystis placenta =

Species of gastropod

Trachycystis placenta is a species of very small, air-breathing, land snail, a terrestrial pulmonate gastropod mollusc in the family Charopidae.

This species is endemic to South Africa. Its natural habitat is subtropical or tropical, moist lowland forests. It is threatened by habitat loss.
