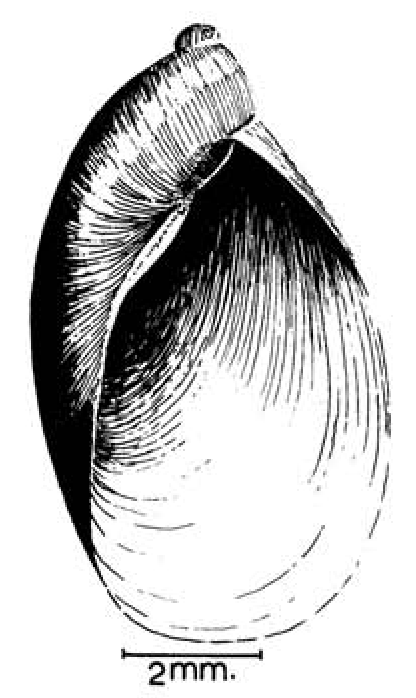
- Drawing of an apertural view of the shell of Oxyloma patentissima

Scientific classification
- Kingdom: Animalia
- Phylum: Mollusca
- Class: Gastropoda
- Order: Stylommatophora
- Family: Succineidae
- Genus: Oxyloma
- Species: O. patentissimum

Binomial name
- Oxyloma patentissimum (Pfeiffer, 1853)

Synonyms
- Succinea patentissima

= Oxyloma patentissimum =

Species of gastropod

Oxyloma patentissimum is a species of land snail, a terrestrial pulmonate gastropod mollusk in the family Succineidae, the amber snails.

== Distribution ==
The distribution of O. patentissimum includes:

- Lake Chad
- Angola
- Botswana
- Zimbabwe, lake Chivero
- southern Mozambique
- South Africa

== Description ==
The width of the shell is 5.1-5.3 mm; the height of the shell is 8.9-10.4 mm.

== Ecology ==
Oxyloma patentissimum lives only in very wet habitats. It is an amphibious species living around freshwater habitats such as streams and lakes, and also in mangroves. This species can also be ecologically considered as a freshwater snail.
