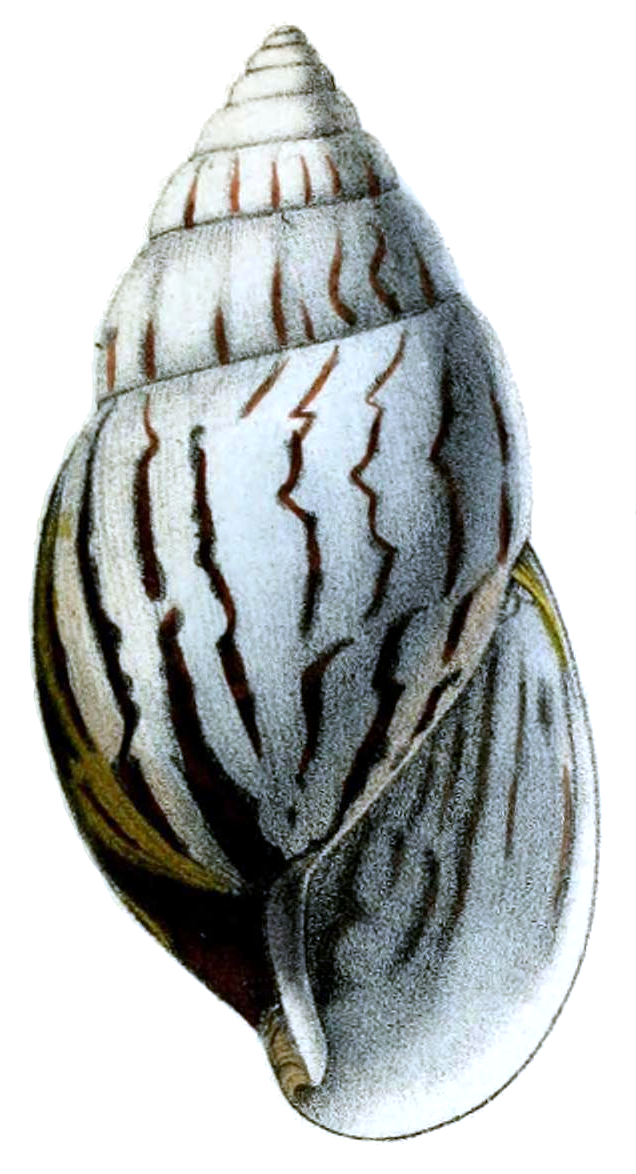
- Drawing of apertural view of a shell of Achatina craveni.

Scientific classification
- Domain: Eukaryota
- Kingdom: Animalia
- Phylum: Mollusca
- Class: Gastropoda
- Order: Stylommatophora
- Suborder: Achatinina
- Superfamily: Achatinoidea
- Family: Achatinidae
- Genus: Achatina
- Species: A. craveni

Binomial name
- Achatina craveni E. A. Smith, 1881

= Achatina craveni =

Species of gastropod

Achatina craveni is a species of air-breathing land snail, a terrestrial pulmonate gastropod mollusk in the family Achatinidae, the giant African snails.

== Distribution ==
Distribution of Achatina craveni includes "between Zanzibar and Lake Tanganyika".

Achatina cf. craveni has been reported also from Mozambique by van Bruggen (2010).
