= List of non-marine molluscs of South Africa =

Freshwater and land species of the molluscan fauna of South Africa

Location of South Africa

The list of non-marine molluscs of South Africa is a list of freshwater and land species that form a part of the molluscan fauna of South Africa.

== Freshwater gastropods ==
Ampullariidae

- Lanistes ovum Troschel, 1845

Pomatiopsidae

- Tomichia cawstoni Connolly, 1939 – endemic
- Tomichia natalensis Connolly, 1939 – endemic
- Tomichia rogersi (Connolly, 1929) – endemic

Thiaridae

- Tarebia granifera (Lamarck, 1822) – non-indigenous
- Thiara amarula (Linnaeus, 1758)
- Melanoides tuberculata (O. F. Müller, 1774)

Paludomidae

- Cleopatra ferruginea (Lea & Lea, 1850)

Lymnaeidae

- Pseudosuccinea columella (Say, 1817) – non-indigenous
- Radix natalensis (Krauss, 1848)

Planorbidae

- Lentorbis carringtoni (de Azevedo et al., 1961)

== Land gastropods ==
Cyclophoridae

- Afrocyclus bhaca Cole, 2019
- Afrocyclus exsertus (Melvill & Ponsonby, 1903)
- Afrocyclus isipingoensis (Sturany, 1898)
- Afrocyclus oxygala Cole, 2019
- Afrocyclus potteri Cole, 2019
- Chondrocyclus alabastris (Craven, 1880)
- Chondrocyclus amathole Cole, 2019
- Chondrocyclus bathrolophodes Connolly, 1929
- Chondrocyclus convexiusculus (Pfeiffer, 1855)
- Chondrocyclus cooperae Cole, 2019
- Chondrocyclus devilliersi Cole, 2019
- Chondrocyclus herberti Cole, 2019
- Chondrocyclus kevincolei Cole, 2019
- Chondrocyclus langebergensis Cole, 2019
- Chondrocyclus pondoensis Cole, 2019
- Chondrocyclus pulcherrimus Cole, 2019
- Chondrocyclus putealis Connolly, 1939
- Chondrocyclus silvicolus Cole, 2019
- Chondrocyclus trifimbriatus Connolly, 1929
- Cyathopoma chirindae (van Bruggen, 1986)
- Cyathopoma meredithae (van Bruggen, 1983)

Succineidae

- Oxyloma patentissima (Pfeiffer, 1853)

Veronicellidae

- Laevicaulis haroldi Dundee, 1980 – endemic

Subulinidae

- Euonyma laeocochlis (Melvill & Ponsonby, 1896)

Streptaxidae

- Gulella appletoni Bruggen, 1975
- Gulella aprosdoketa Connolly, 1939 – endemic
- Gulella arnoldi (Sturany, 1898)
- Gulella bomvana Cole & Herbert, 2009
- Gulella bruggeni Cole & Herbert, 2009
- Gulella chi Burnup, 1926
- Gulella claustralis Connolly, 1939 – endemic
- Gulella dejae Bursey & Herbert, 2004
- Gulella farquhari (Melvill & Ponsonby, 1895)
- Gulella fraudator Connolly, 1939
- Gulella hamerae Bursey & Herbert, 2004
- Gulella hodgkinsonae
- Gulella incurvidens Bruggen, 1972
- Gulella latimerae Bursey & Herbert 2004
- Gulella mariae (Melvill & Ponsonby, 1892)
- Gulella munita (Melvill & Ponsonby, 1893)
- Gulella ndibo Cole & Herbert, 2009
- Gulella newmani Bursey & Herbert, 2004
- Gulella peakei continentalis Bruggen, 1975
- Gulella pentheri (Sturany, 1898)
- Gulella phyllisae Burnup, 1914
- Gulella planti – Plant's gulella snail, endemic
- Gulella pondoensis Connolly, 1939
- Gulella puzeyi Connolly, 1939 – endemic
- Gulella salpinx Herbert, 2002 – endemic
- Gulella sylvia (Melvill & Ponsonby, 1903)
- Gulella tharfieldensis (Melvill & Ponsonby, 1893)
- Gulella tietzae Cole & Herbert, 2009
- Gulella wendalinae Bruggen, 1975

Bothriembryontidae

- Prestonella – the genus with 3 species is endemic to South Africa.
- Prestonella bowkeri (Sowerby, 1889)
- Prestonella nuptialis (Melvill & Ponsonby, 1894)
- Prestonella quadingensis Connolly, 1929

Rhytididae

- Chlamydephorus bruggeni (L. Forcart, 1967)
- Chlamydephorus burnupi (Smith, 1892)
- Chlamydephorus dimidius (Watson, 1915)
- Chlamydephorus gibbonsi W.G. Binney, 1879
- Chlamydephorus lawrencei (L. Forcart, 1963)
- Chlamydephorus parva (H. Watson, 1915)
- Chlamydephorus purcelli (Collinge, 1901) – Purcell's hunter slug, endemic
- Chlamydephorus sexangulus (H. Watson, 1915)
- Chlamydephorus watsoni (L. Forcart, 1967)
- Afrorhytida burseyae D.G. Herbert & A. Moussalli, 2010
- Afrorhytida knysnaensis (L. Pfeiffer, 1846)
- Afrorhytida kraussi (L. Pfeiffer, 1846)
- Afrorhytida trimeni (Melvill & Ponsonby, 1892)
- Capitina calcicola Herbert & Moussalli, 2010
- Capitina schaerfiae (Pfeiffer, 1861)
- Nata aequiplicata Herbert & Moussali, 2016
- Nata dumeticola Benson 1851
- Nata tarachodes (Connolly, 1912)
- Nata vernicosa-erugata
- Nata watsoni Herbert & Moussali, 2016
- Natalina beyrichi (Von Martens, 1890) – Pondoland cannibal snail, endemic
- Natalina cafra (Férussac, 1821)
- Natalina inhluzana (Melvill & Ponsonby, 1894)
- Natalina quekettiana (Melvill & Ponsonby, 1893)
- Natalina reenenensis Connolly, 1939
- Natalina wesseliana Kobelt, 1876 – Tongaland cannibal snail, endemic
- Natella viridescens (Melvill & Ponsonby, 1891)

Urocyclidae

- Kerkophorus ampliatus (Melvill & Ponsonby, 1899)
- Kerkophorus bicolor Godwin-Austen, 1914
- Kerkophorus cingulatus (Melvill & Ponsonby, 1890)
- Kerkophorus corneus (L. Pfeiffer, 1846)
- Kerkophorus inunctus (Connolly 1939)
- Kerkophorus knysnaensis (Pretson, 1912)
- Kerkophorus melvilli Godwin-Austen, 1912
- Kerkophorus perfragilis Connolly, 1922
- Kerkophorus perlevis (Preston, 1912)
- Kerkophorus piperatus-vittarubra
- Kerkophorus poeppigii (L. Pfeiffer, 1846)
- Kerkophorus pumilio (Melvill & Ponsonby, 1909)
- Kerkophorus phaedimus (Melvill & Ponsonby, 1892)
- Kerkophorus piperatus Herbert, 2017
- Kerkophorus puzeyi (Connolly, 1939)
- Kerkophorus russofulgens (Melvill & Ponsonby, 1909)
- Kerkophorus scrobicolus Herbert, 2017
- Kerkophorus terrestris Herbert, 2017
- Kerkophorus vandenbroeckii (Craven, 1881)
- Kerkophorus vitalis (Melvill & Ponsonby, 1908)
- Kerkophorus vittarubra Herbert, 2017
- Kerkophorus zonamydrus (Melvill & Ponsonby, 1890)
- Microkerkus arnotti (Benson, 1864)
- Microkerkus burnupi (Godwin-Austen, 1914)
- Microkerkus chrysoprasinus (Melvill & Ponsonby, 1892)
- Microkerkus fuscicolor (Melvill & Ponsonby, 1892)
- Microkerkus leucospira (L. Pfeiffer, 1857)
- Microkerkus maseruensis Connolly, 1929
- Microkerkus pondoensis (Godwin-Austen, 1912)
- Microkerkus sibaya Herbert, 2017
- Microkerkus symmetricus (Craven, 1881)
- Microkerkus transvaalensis (Craven, 1881)
- Ptilototheca soutpansbergensis Herbert 2016
- Selatodryas luteosoma-roseosoma
- Selatodryas luteosoma Herbert, 2017
- Selatodryas roseosoma Herbert, 2017
- Sheldonia aloicola (Melvill & Ponsonby, 1890)
- Sheldonia asthenes (Melvill & Ponsonby, 1907)
- Sheldonia caledonensis (Godwin-Austen, 1912)
- Sheldonia capsula (Benson, 1864)
- Sheldonia cotyledonis (Benson, 1850)
- Sheldonia crawfordi (Melvill & Ponsonby, 1890)
- Sheldonia fingolandensis Herbert, 2017
- Sheldonia hudsoniae (Benson, 1864)
- Sheldonia monsmaripi Herbert, 2016
- Sheldonia natalensis (Pfeiffer, 1846)
- Sheldonia phytostylus (Benson, 1864)
- Sheldonia puzeyi (Connolly, 1939)
- Sheldonia transvaalensis (Craven, 1880)
- Sheldonia trotteriana (Benson, 1848)
- Sheldonia wolkbergensis (Herbert, 2016)

Charopidae

- Trachycystis clifdeni Connolly, 1932 – endemic
- Trachycystis haygarthi (Melvill & Ponsonby, 1899) – endemic
- Trachycystis placenta (Melvill & Ponsonby, 1899) – endemic

== See also ==
- List of marine molluscs of South Africa

Lists of molluscs of surrounding countries:

- List of non-marine molluscs of Namibia
- List of non-marine molluscs of Botswana
- List of non-marine molluscs of Zimbabwe
- List of non-marine molluscs of Mozambique
- List of non-marine molluscs of Swaziland
- List of non-marine molluscs of Lesotho
