= Afrogyrorbis =

Scientific classification
- Kingdom: Animalia
- Phylum: Mollusca
- Class: Gastropoda
- Superorder: Hygrophila
- Family: Planorbidae
- Subfamily: Planorbinae
- Tribe: Planorbini
- Genus: Afrogyrorbis; Starobogatov, 1967

Genus of gastropods

Afrogyrorbis is a genus of gastropods in the family Planorbidae.

== Species ==
- Afrogyrorbis bicarinatus (Mandahl-Barth, 1954)
- Afrogyrorbis blanfordi (Brown, 1973)
- Afrogyrorbis kigeziensis (Preston, 1912)
- Afrogyrorbis kisumiensis (Preston, 1912)
- Afrogyrorbis natalensis (Krauss, 1848)
- Afrogyrorbis subtilis (Mandahl-Barth, 1954)
