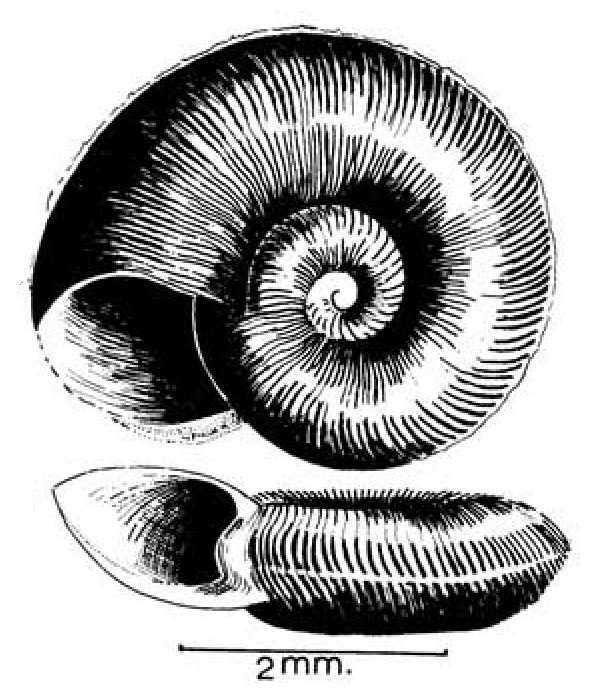
- Drawing of apical and apertural view of the shell of Gyraulus costulatus.

Conservation status
- Least Concern (IUCN 3.1)

Scientific classification
- Kingdom: Animalia
- Phylum: Mollusca
- Class: Gastropoda
- Superorder: Hygrophila
- Family: Planorbidae
- Genus: Gyraulus
- Species: G. costulatus

Binomial name
- Gyraulus costulatus (Krauss, 1848)

Synonyms
- Gyraulus exilis Mandahl-Barth, 1954; Planorbis costulatus Krauss, 1848

= Gyraulus costulatus =

Species of gastropod

Gyraulus costulatus is a species of air-breathing freshwater snail, aquatic pulmonate gastropod mollusk in the family Planorbidae, the ram's horn snails.

== Distribution ==
Gyraulus costulatus is widespread in Africa and distribution of Gyraulus costulatus include Algeria, Angola, Benin, Botswana, Burkina Faso, Burundi, Cameroon, Central African Republic, Chad, Congo, Egypt, mainland of the Equatorial Guinea, Eswatini, Ethiopia, Gabon, Gambia, Ghana, Guinea, Guinea-Bissau, Kenya, Liberia, Malawi, Mali, Mauritania; Mozambique, Namibia, Niger, Nigeria, Senegal, Sierra Leone, South Africa, Sudan, Tanzania, Togo, Uganda, Zambia and Zimbabwe.

== Description ==
All species within family Planorbidae have sinistral shells.
