= Wildlife of Mozambique =

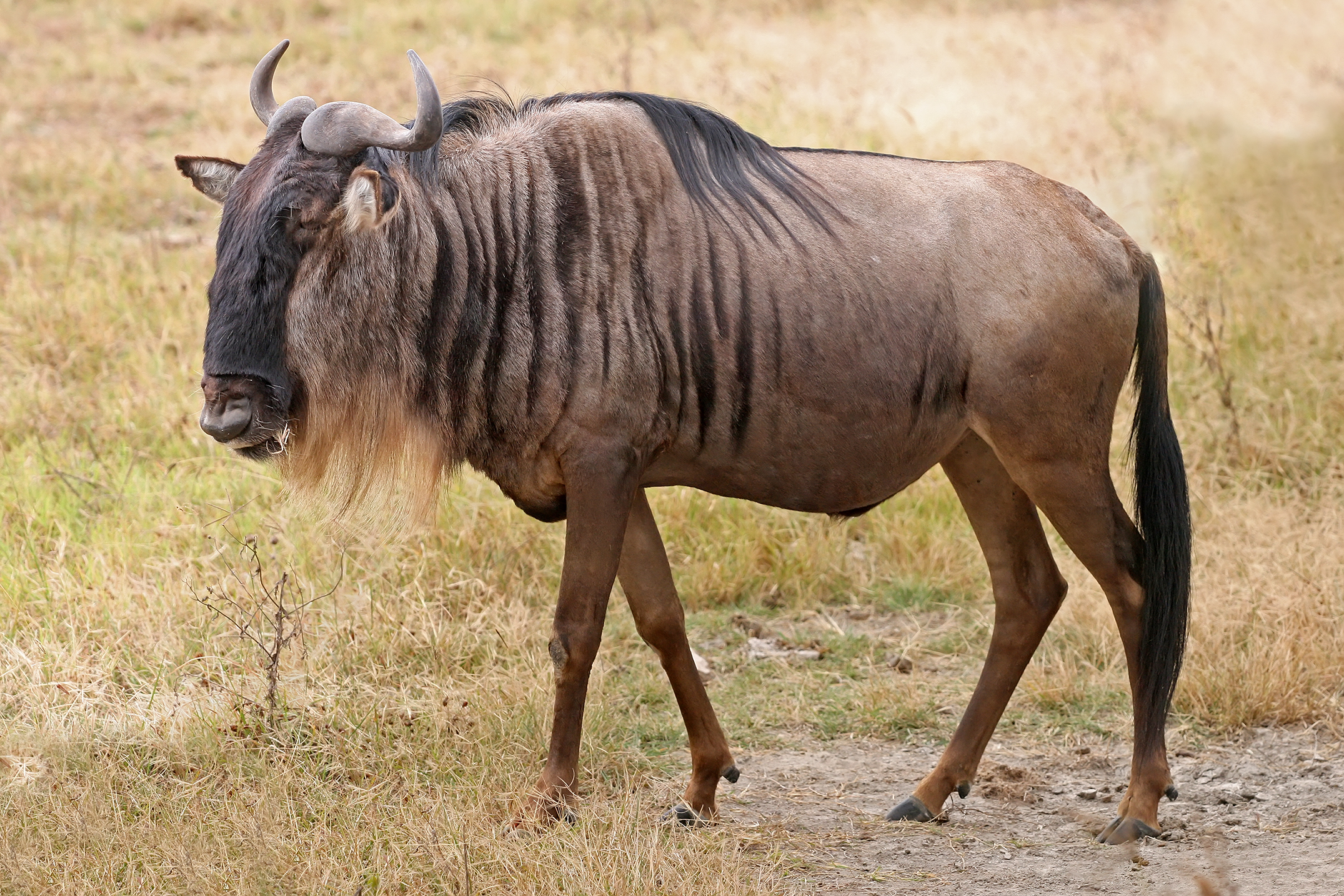
Blue wildebeest

The wildlife of Mozambique consists of the flora and fauna of this country in southeastern Africa. Mozambique has a range of different habitat types and an ecologically rich and diverse wildlife. This includes 236 species of mammal, 740 species of bird and 5,692 species of vascular plant. The Maputaland-Pondoland-Albany hotspot, with significantly high levels of biodiversity, stretches from the southern tip of Mozambique into northeastern South Africa.

== Geography ==
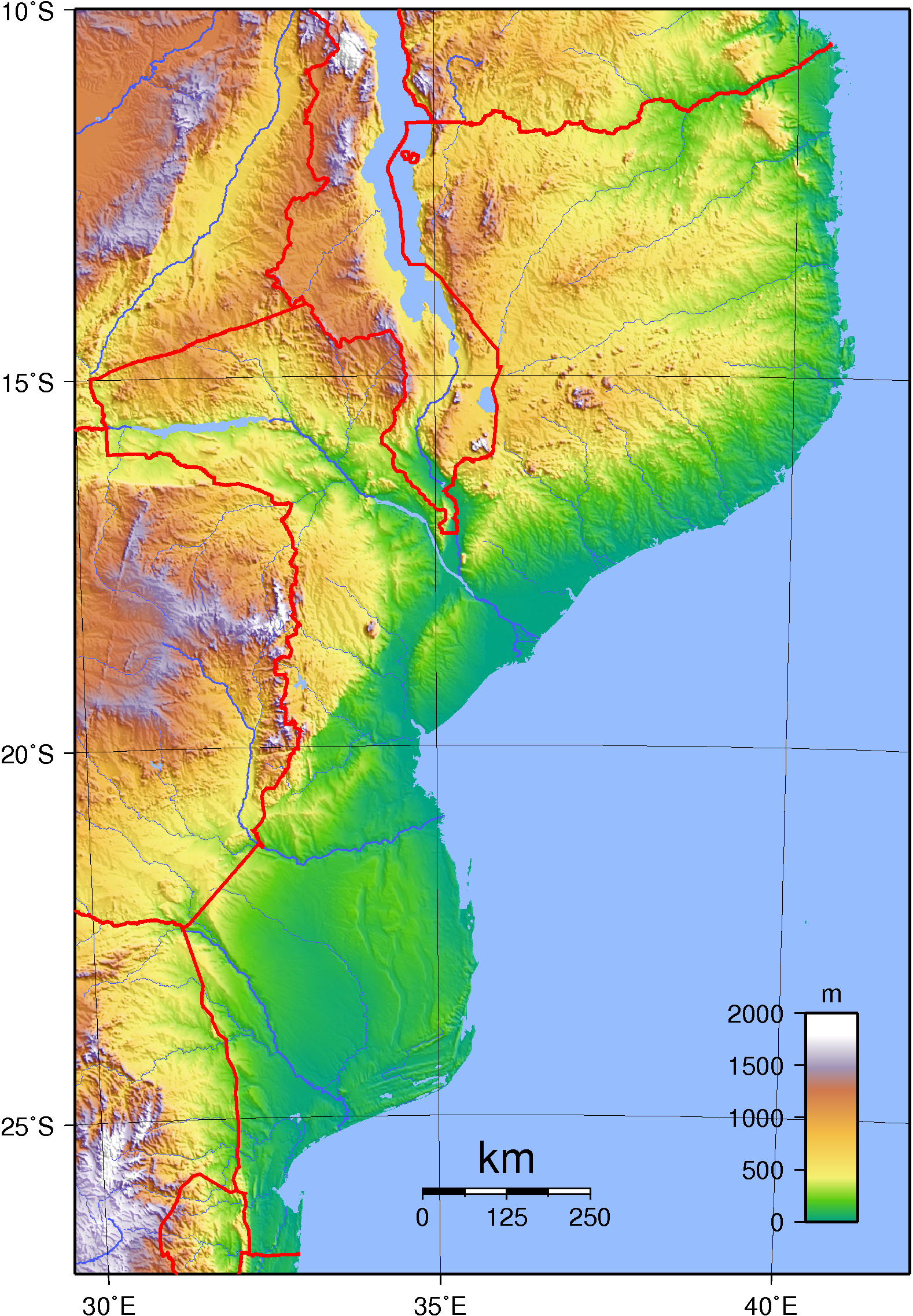
Topography of Mozambique

Mozambique is located on the southeast coast of Africa. It is bounded by Eswatini to the south, South Africa to the south and southwest, Zimbabwe to the west, Zambia and Malawi to the northwest, Tanzania to the north and the Indian Ocean to the east. Mozambique lies between latitudes 10° and 27°S, and longitudes 30° and 41°E.

The country is divided into two topographical regions by the Zambezi River. To the north of the Zambezi, the narrow coastal strip gives way to inland hills and low plateaus. Rugged highlands are further west; they include the Niassa highlands, Namuli or Shire highlands, Angonia highlands, Tete highlands and the Makonde plateau, covered with miombo woodlands. To the south of the Zambezi River, the lowlands are broader with the Mashonaland plateau and Lebombo Mountains located in the deep south. The country is drained by five principal rivers and several smaller ones with the largest and most important being the Zambezi. There are four large lakes, all in the north of the country; Lake Niassa (or Malawi), Lake Chiuta, Lake Cahora Bassa and Lake Shirwa.

Mozambique has a tropical climate with a wet season from October to March and a dry season from April to September. Climatic conditions, however, vary depending on altitude. Rainfall is heavy along the coast and decreases in the north and south of the country. Annual rainfall varies from 500 to 900 mm (20 to 35 in) depending on the region, with an average of 590 mm (23 in). Average temperature ranges in Maputo are from 13 to 24 °C (55 to 75 °F) in July and from 22 to 31 °C (72 to 88 °F) in February. Much of the inland part of southern Mozambique is semi-desert.

== Flora ==
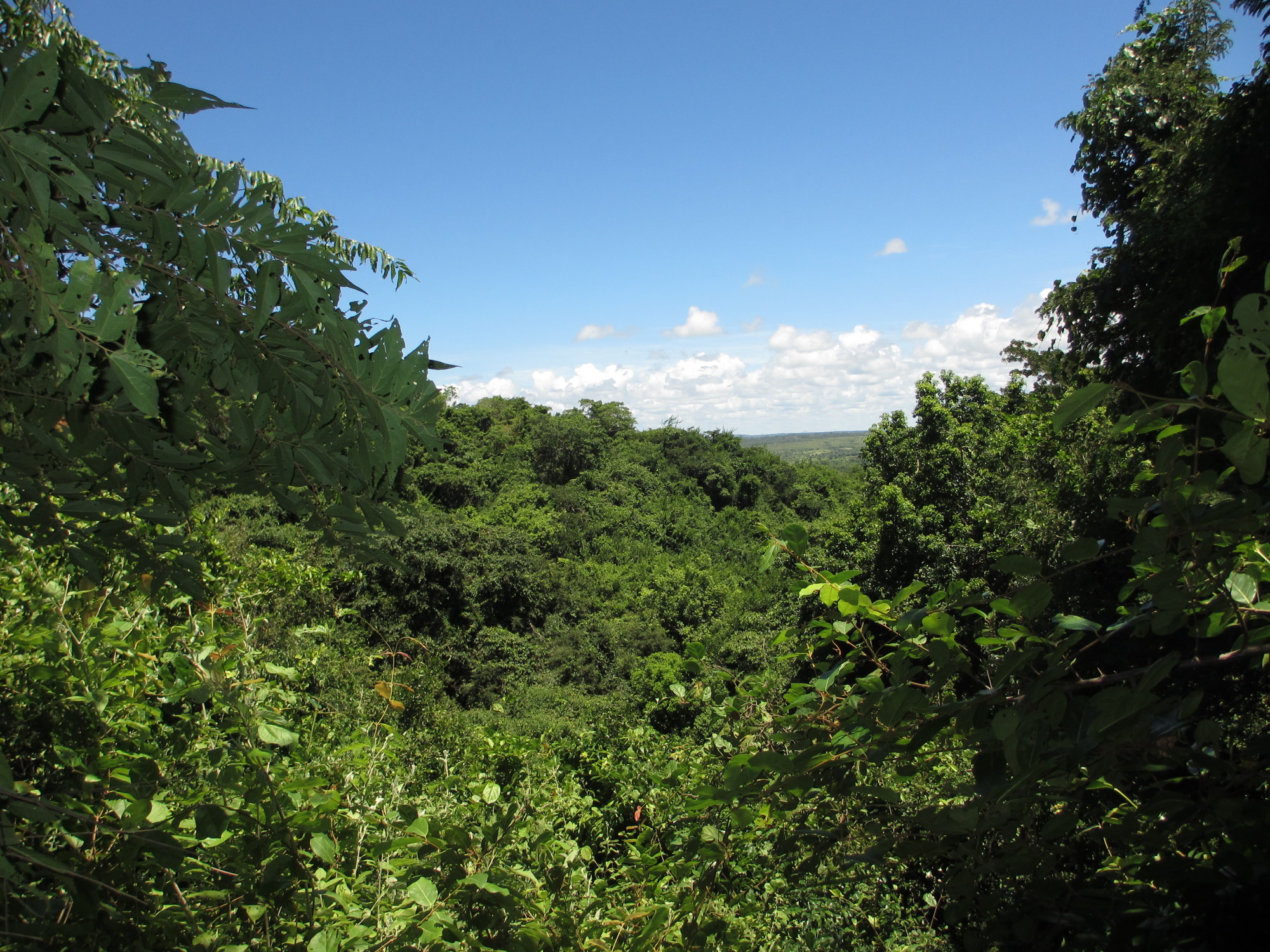
Humid forest, near Pemba in Cabo Delgado Province in northern Mozambique.

A total of 5,692 species of vascular plant has been recorded in the country, of which 145 species are considered to be threatened. Most of the terrain of Mozambique is covered by wooded savanna, grassland with a scattering of trees but an open canopy. In the northern part of the country this is miombo woodland, dominated by Brachystegia trees, covering about 70% of the country. In drier areas further south, mopane woodland predominates, with Acacia woodland in some areas in the south and in riverside locations in the north. Forest cover is mostly limited to the upper mountain slopes and some gallery forests, with some patches of dry lowland forests occurring in certain coastal areas, notably near Cape Delgado and around Dondo. The Maputaland-Pondoland-Albany Hotspot in southern Mozambique and northeastern South Africa, is a biogeographic region with significantly high levels of biodiversity and plant endemism.

The scenery on many parts of the coast consists of thickets, scrubland and palm groves. The floodplains of the main rivers consist of alluvial grassland and marshes. The Zambezi Delta is a vast marshy area covering 8,000 km^{2} (3,000 sq mi) with grasses and Borassus palms, extending for 120 km (75 mi) along the coast. A fringe of mangroves can be found along much of the coast, the trees growing to a height of 10 m (30 ft), and there are extensive areas of mangroves in the Zambezi and Messalo River deltas where the height of the trees can reach 25 to 30 m (80 to 100 ft). Ten different species of mangrove have been recorded here, including Lumnitzera racemosa and Xylocarpus granatum.

== Fauna ==
Some 236 species of mammal have been recorded in Mozambique, of which 17 species are considered threatened. Ungulates found here include the common warthog, the hippopotamus and the South African giraffe and around twenty species of antelope including the common eland, the Lichtenstein's hartebeest, the greater kudu, the sable antelope, the nyala, the waterbuck, the blue wildebeest and the Cape bushbuck. There are around fifty species of rodent, a dozen of shrew, over sixty species of bat and a single hedgehog, the four-toed hedgehog. Primates are represented by bushbabies, vervet monkeys, blue monkeys, chacma baboons and yellow baboons. There are African bush elephants, lions, leopards, Southeast African cheetahs, genets, mongooses, hyaenas, jackals and various other species of carnivore.

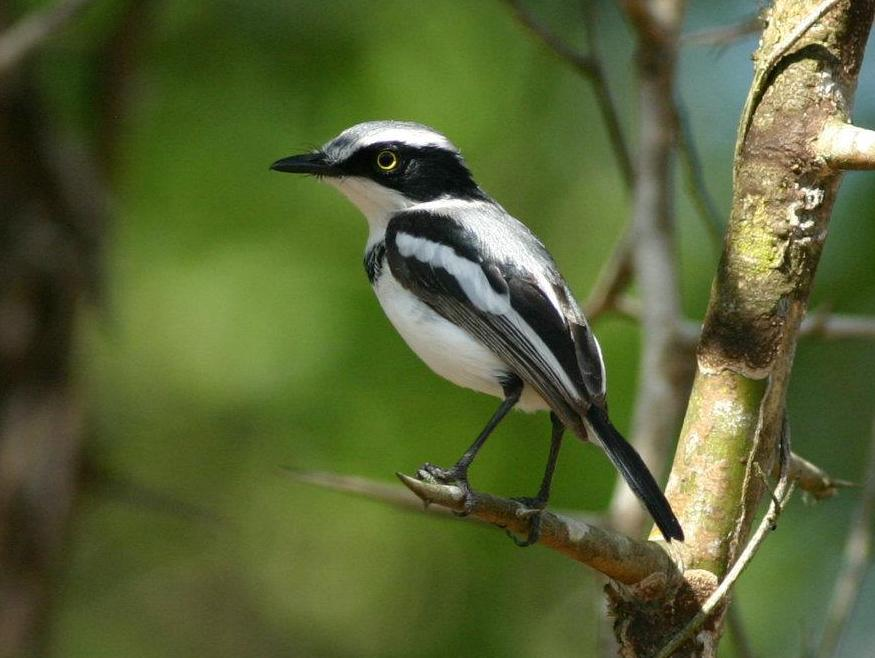
Pale batis, a resident of miombo woodland

Large numbers of birds are either resident in or migrate across Mozambique, 768 species having been recorded, including 34 globally threatened species. Some notable examples include the lesser jacana, the crab-plover, the mangrove kingfisher, the Böhm's bee-eater, the racket-tailed roller, the African pitta, the green-headed oriole, the collared palm thrush, the pale batis, the lowland tiny greenbul, the lesser seedcracker and the locust finch.

There is also a rich fauna of reptiles and amphibians, with 225 species of reptile recorded in the country (as compiled by the Reptile Database), and 90 species of amphibian (compiled by AmphibiaWeb). There are numerous species of snake, with venomous species including the puff adder, several species of cobra, the black mamba and the boomslang. Non-venomous snakes include the mole snake, and the egg-eating snake. The Nile crocodile is only likely to be found in protected areas. The savannah monitor is the largest lizard in the country, but more common are the much smaller skinks, agamas, chamaeleons and house geckos. The leopard tortoise occurs here as well as three species of freshwater terrapin.

With a long coastline, Mozambique boasts numerous marine vertebrates, including about twenty species of whale and ten of dolphin, the dugong, the brown fur seal and the southern elephant seal. The country has a large number of marine mollusc species, as well as plentiful numbers of terrestrial snails and slugs.

== Protected areas ==
Mozambique has seven national parks, two of which are largely marine, and six national reserves. Additionally, there are several other protected areas, three community wildlife utilisation areas, various wildlife utilisation areas and forest reserves. In reality, many of these have little protection and many animals were severely depleted as a result of the Mozambican Civil War (1977–1992) and the increase in poaching which took place at that time. More recently, efforts are being made to restock some of the protected areas with animals brought in from elsewhere, and facilities for visitors have improved, particularly at Gorongosa National Park.

=== National parks ===
National parks in Mozambique include:

- Banhine National Park, Parque Nacional de Banhine - Gaza (7,250 km^{2})
- Bazaruto National Park, Parque Nacional do Arquipelago de Bazaruto - Inhambane (1,463 km^{2})
- Gorongosa National Park, Parque Nacional da Gorongosa - Sofala (5,370 km^{2})
- Limpopo National Park, Parque Nacional do Limpopo - Gaza (11,233 km^{2})
- Magoe National Park, Parque Nacional do Magoe - Tete (3,558 km^{2})
- Quirimbas National Park, Parque Nacional das Quirimbas - Cabo Delgado (9,130 km^{2})
- Zinave National Park, Parque Nacional do Zinave - Inhambane (4,000 km^{2})

=== National reserves ===
National reserves in Mozambique include:

- Chimanimani National Reserve, Reserva Nacional do Chimanimani - Manica (6550 km^{2})
- Gilé National Reserve, Reserva Nacional do Gilé - Zambézia (4,436 km^{2})
- Maputo Special Reserve, Reserva Especial de Maputo - Maputo (1,040 km^{2})
- Marromeu Buffalo Reserve, Reserva de Búfalos de Marromeu - Sofala (1,500 km^{2})
- Niassa National Reserve, Reserva Nacional do Niassa - Niassa (42,200 km^{2})
- Pomene National Reserve, Reserva National de Pomene - Inhambane (50 km^{2})
