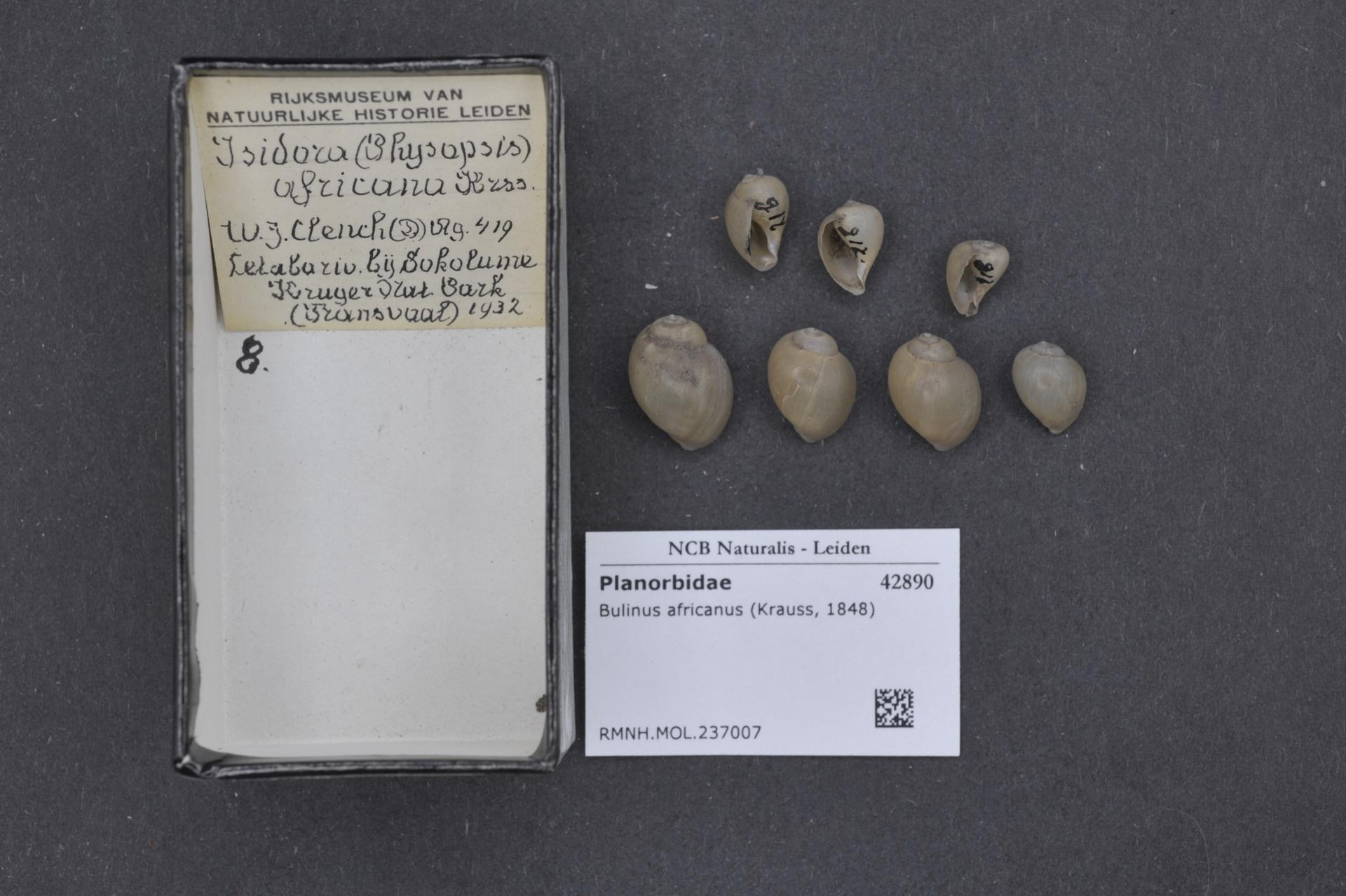
- Bulinus africanus shells

Conservation status
- Least Concern (IUCN 3.1)

Scientific classification
- Kingdom: Animalia
- Phylum: Mollusca
- Class: Gastropoda
- Superorder: Hygrophila
- Family: Bulinidae
- Genus: Bulinus
- Species: B. africanus

Binomial name
- Bulinus africanus (Krauss, 1848)

Synonyms
- Physopsis africanus Krauss, 1848

= Bulinus africanus =

Species of gastropod

Bulinus africanus is a species of a tropical freshwater snail with a sinistral shell, an aquatic gastropod mollusk in the family Planorbidae, the ramshorn snails and their allies.
