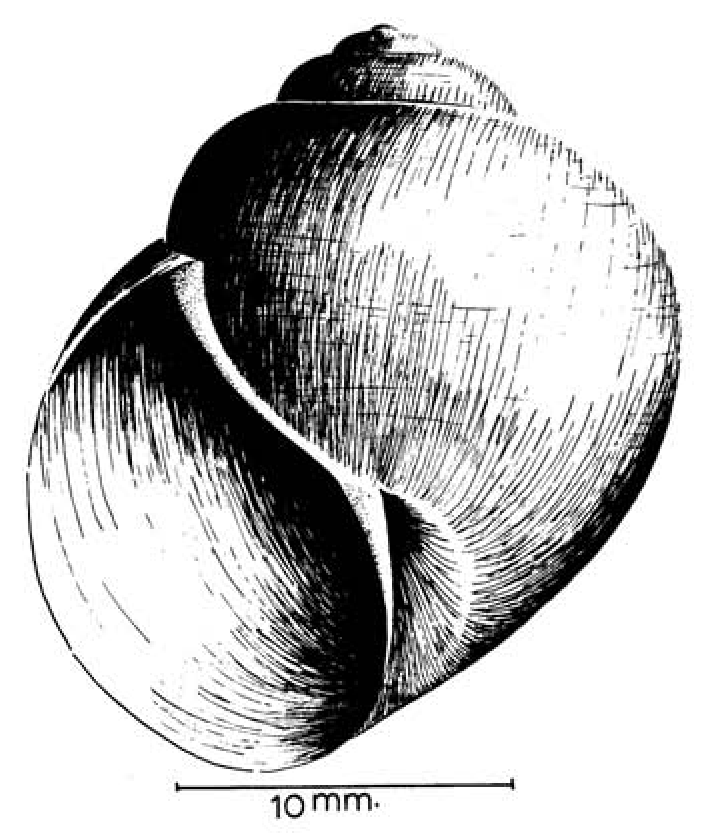
- Drawing of apertural view of the shell of Lanistes ovum

Conservation status
- Least Concern (IUCN 3.1)

Scientific classification
- Kingdom: Animalia
- Phylum: Mollusca
- Class: Gastropoda
- Subclass: Caenogastropoda
- Order: Architaenioglossa
- Family: Ampullariidae
- Genus: Lanistes
- Species: L. ovum

Binomial name
- Lanistes ovum Peters, 1845

Synonyms
- Lanistes connollyi Pain, 1954; Lanistes elatior Haas, 1936; Lanistes innesi Pallary, 1902; Lanistes procerus Martens, 1866

= Lanistes ovum =

Species of gastropod

Lanistes ovum is a species of freshwater snail with an operculum, an African apple snail, an aquatic gastropod mollusk in the family Ampullariidae.

The shell coiling in this species is left-handed, aka sinistral.

This species of snail is widely found in Botswana, Congo, Chad, Ghana, Cameroon, Gambia, Angola, Namibia, Niger, Nigeria, Tanzania, Mozambique, Zimbabwe and South Africa.

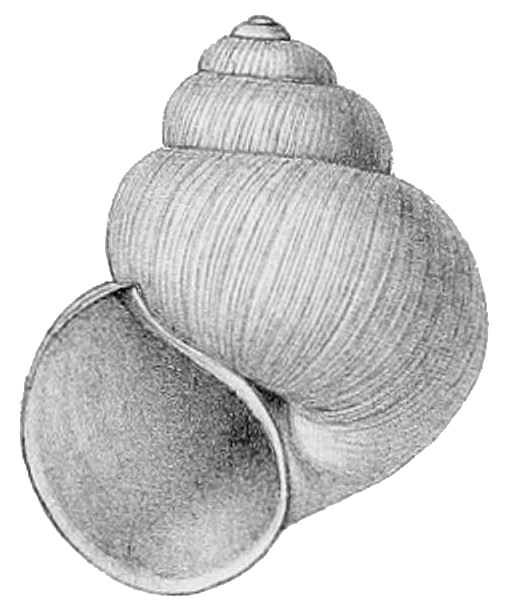
Drawing of apertural view.

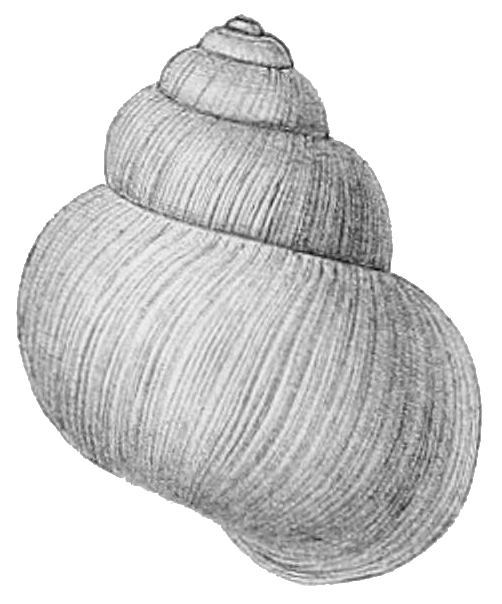
Drawing of abapertural view.

== Habitat ==
These snails are found at an altitude of between 0 and 920 m (3,018 feet).
