= List of non-marine molluscs of Nigeria =

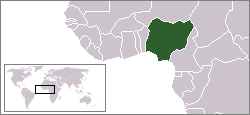
Location of Nigeria

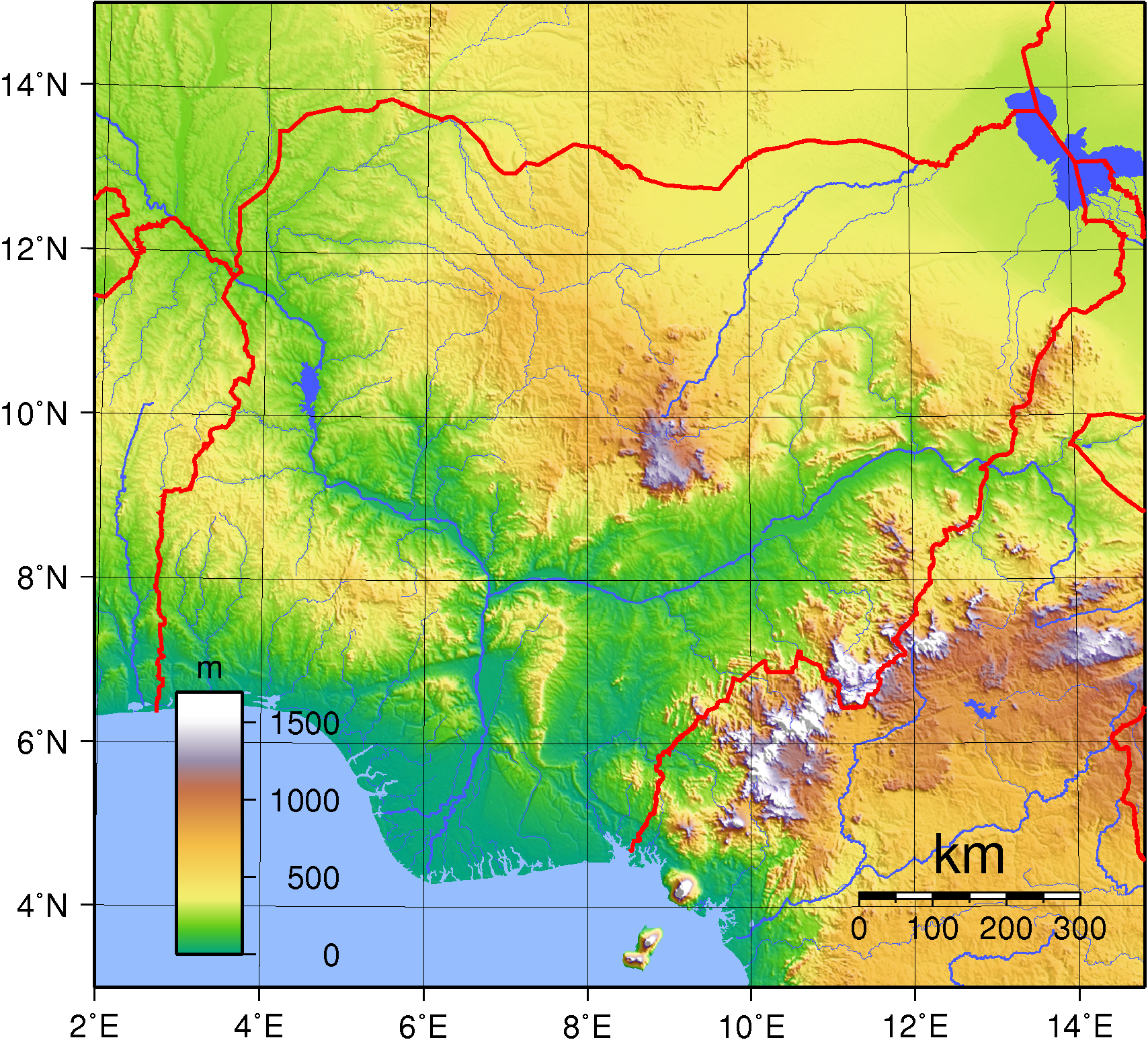
topography of Nigeria

The non-marine molluscs of Nigeria are a part of the molluscan fauna of Nigeria (wildlife of Nigeria).

A number of species of non-marine molluscs are found in the wild in Nigeria.

== Freshwater gastropods ==
Freshwater gastropods in Nigeria include:

Neritidae

- Clypeolum owenianum (Wood, 1828)
- Vitta cristata (Morelet, 1864)
- Vitta glabrata (Sowerby, 1849)
- Vitta rubricata (Morelet, 1858)

Ampullariidae

- Lanistes libycus (Morelet, 1848)
- Lanistes ovum Peters, 1845
- Pila ovata (Olivier, 1804)
- Pila wernei (Philipi, 1851)

Thiaridae

- Melanoides tuberculata (O. F. Müller, 1774)
- Pachymelania aurita (Müller, 1774)
- Pachymelania byronensis (Wood, 1828)
- Pachymelania fusca (Gmelin, 1791)

Pachychilidae

- Potadoma freethi (Gray, 1831)
- Potadoma liberiensis (Schepman, 1888)
- Potadoma moerchi (Reeve, 1859)

Hydrobiidae

- Potamopyrgus ciliatus (Gould, 1850)

Assimineidae

- Assiminea hessei O. Boettger, 1887

Bithyniidae

- Gabbiella africana (Frauenfeld, 1862)
- Gabbiella tchadiensis Mandahl-Barth, 1968

Viviparidae

- Bellamya unicolor (Olivier, 1804)

Planorbidae

- Africanogyrus coretus (de Blainville, 1826)
- Amerianna carinata (H. Adams, 1861)
- Biomphalaria camerunensis (C.R. Boettger, 1941)
- Biomphalaria pfeifferi (Krauss, 1848)
- Bulinus camerunensis Mandahl-Barth, 1957
- Bulinus forskalii (Ehrenberg, 1831)
- Bulinus globosus (Morelet, 1866)
- Bulinus jousseaumei (Dautzenberg, 1890)
- Bulinus senegalensis O. F. Müller, 1781
- Bulinus truncatus (Audouin, 1827) - synonym: Bulinus rohlfsi Clessin
- Bulinus umbilicatus Mandahl-Barth, 1973
- Ferrissia sp.
- Gyraulus costulatus (Krauss, 1848)
- Indoplanorbis exustus (Deshayes, 1834)
- Pettancylus eburnensis (Binder, 1957)
- Segmentorbis sp.
- Segmentorbis angustus (Jickeli, 1874)

Lymnaeidae

- Radix natalensis (Krauss, 1848)

Physidae

- Aplexa waterloti (Germain, 1911)
- Physa marmorata Guilding, 1828

Potamididae

- Tympanotonos fuscatus (Linnaeus, 1758)

Ellobiidae

- Melampus liberianus H. & A. Adams, 1854

== Land gastropods ==
Land gastropods in Nigeria include:

Succineidae

- Quickia sp.

Achatinidae

- Achatina achatina Linnaeus, 1758
- Archachatina marginata (Swainson, 1821)
- Archachatina papyracea (L. Pfeiffer, 1845)
- Lignus sp.
- Limicolaria aurora (Jay, 1839)
- Limicolaria flammea (Müller, 1774)

Aillyidae

- Aillya camerunensis Odhner, 1927

Euconulidae

- Afropunctium seminium (Morelet 1873)

Streptaxidae

- Costigulella mfamosingi Oke, 2013
- Edentulina liberiana (I. Lea, 1840)
- Ennea nigeriensis de Winter & de Gier, 2019
- Gonaxis camerunensis (d'Ailly, 1896)
- Gulella egborgei Oke, 2013
- Gulella gemma (d'Ailly, 1896)
- Gulella io Verdcourt, 1974
- Gulella monodon (Morelet, 1873)
- Gulella obani Oke, 2007
- Gulella odietei Oke, 2013
- Gulella ogbeifuni Oke, 2013
- Gulella opoboensis H.B. Preston, 1914
- Gulella pupa (Thiele, 1911)
- Gulella reesi H.B. Preston, 1914
- Ptychotrema aequatoriale Pilsbry, 1919
- Ptychotrema gelegelei Oke, 2004
- Ptychotrema okei de Winter, 1996
- Ptychotrema shagamuense (O.C. Oke & Odiete, 1996)
- Streptostele musaecola (Morelet, 1860)

Subulinidae

- Curvella feai J. Germain, 1915
- Curvella ovata (Putzeys, 1899)
- Curvella sp.
- Pseudopeas sp. 1
- Subulina sp. 1
- Subulina sp. 2
- Subulina involunta
- Subulina striatella (Rang, 1831)
- Subulona sp.
- Subulona pattalus H.A. Pilsbry, 1906

Helicarionidae

- Kaliella sp.
- Thapsia sp.
- Trochozonites talcosus (Gould, 1850)
- Trochozonites sp. 1

Urocyclidae

- Thapsia oscitans (M. Connolly, 1925)

== Freshwater bivalves ==
Freshwater bivalves in Nigeria include:

Iridinidae

- Aspatharia chaiziana (Rang, 1835)
- Aspatharia dahomeyensis (Lea, 1859)
- Chambardia rubens (Lamarck, 1819)
- Chambardia wahlbergi (Krauss, 1848)
- Chambardia wissmanni (von Martens, 1883)
- Mutela rostrata (Rang, 1835)
- Pleiodon ovatus (Swainson, 1823)

Sphaeriidae

- Eupera ferruginea (Krauss, 1848)
- Pisidium pirothi Jickeli, 1881
- Sphaerium hartmanni (Jickeli, 1874)

Etheriidae

- Etheria elliptica Lamarck, 1807

Unionidae

- Coelatura aegyptiaca (Cailliaud, 1827)

Cyrenidae

- Corbicula fluminalis (Müller, 1774)

== See also ==
Lists of molluscs of surrounding countries:

- List of non-marine molluscs of Benin, Wildlife of Benin
- List of non-marine molluscs of Chad, Wildlife of Chad
- List of non-marine molluscs of Cameroon, Wildlife of Cameroon
- List of non-marine molluscs of Niger, Wildlife of Niger
