= List of non-marine molluscs of Benin =

Location of Benin

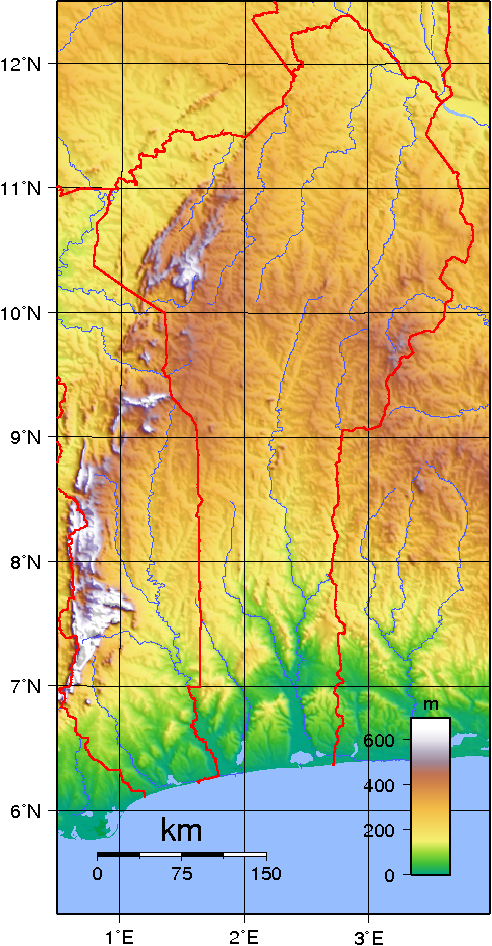
topography of Benin

The non-marine molluscs of Benin are a part of the molluscan fauna of Benin (wildlife of Benin).

A number of species of non-marine molluscs are found in the wild in Benin.

== Freshwater gastropods ==
Planorbidae

- Africanogyrus coretus (de Blainville, 1826)
- Biomphalaria camerunensis (C. R. Boettger, 1941)
- Bulinus forskalii (Ehrenberg, 1831)
- Bulinus globosus (Morelet, 1866)
- Bulinus senegalensis Müller, 1781
- Gyraulus costulatus (Krauss, 1848)
- Segmentorbis kanisaensis (Preston, 1914)

Paludomidae

- Cleopatra bulimoides (Olivier, 1804)

Thiaridae

- Pachymelania aurita (Müller, 1774)
- Pachymelania byronensis (Wood, 1828)
- Pachymelania fusca (Gmelin, 1791)

Pachychilidae

- Potadoma freethi (Gray, 1831)
- Potadoma moerchi (Reeve, 1859)

Potamididae

- Tympanotonos fuscatus (Linnaeus, 1758) – in brackish water

Ampullariidae

- Lanistes libycus (Morelet, 1848)

Hydrobiidae

- Hydrobia lineata Binder, 1957
- Potamopyrgus ciliatus (Gould, 1850)

Neritidae

- Neritina oweniana (Wood, 1828)
- Neritina rubricata Morelet, 1858

Lymnaeidae

- Radix natalensis (Krauss, 1848)

== Land gastropods ==
Land gastropods in Cameroon include:

== Freshwater bivalves ==
Etheria elliptica is the only freshwater oyster occurring in Africa.

== See also ==
- List of marine molluscs of Benin

Lists of molluscs of surrounding countries:

- List of non-marine molluscs of Togo, Wildlife of Togo
- List of non-marine molluscs of Nigeria, Wildlife of Nigeria
- List of non-marine molluscs of Burkina Faso, Wildlife of Burkina Faso
- List of non-marine molluscs of Niger, Wildlife of Niger
