= List of non-marine molluscs of Sierra Leone =

Location of Sierra Leone

The non-marine molluscs of Sierra Leone are a part of the molluscan fauna of Sierra Leone.

A number of species of non-marine molluscs are found in the wild in Sierra Leone.

== Freshwater gastropods ==
Freshwater gastropods in Sierra Leone include: Ampullariidae

- Saulea vitrea (Born, 1778)

Bithyniidae

- Sierraia leonensis Connolly, 1929
- Sierraia whitei D.S. Brown, 1988

Hemisinidae

- Pachymelania byronensis (W. Wood, 1828)

Bulinidae

- Bulinus forskalii (Ehrenberg, 1831)
- Bulinus globosus (Morelet, 1866)
- Bulinus senegalensis O.F. Müller, 1781

Lymnaeidae

- Radix natalensis (Krauss, 1848)

== Land gastropods ==
Land gastropods in Sierra Leone include:

Maizaniidae

- Maizaniella leonensis (Morelet, 1873)

Urocyclidae

- Granularion atromaculatus Van Mol, 1970
- Granularion lomaensis Van Mol, 1970
- Granularion marmoratus Van Mol, 1970
- Granularion paratenuis Van Mol, 1970
- Granularion tenuis Van Mol, 1970
- Verrucarion demeryi de Winter, 1987

== Freshwater bivalves ==
Freshwater bivalves in Sierra Leone include:

Donacidae

- Galatea paradoxa (Born, 1778)

Etheriidae

- Etheria elliptica Lamarck, 1807

Iridinidae

- Pleiodon ovatus (Swainson, 1823)

Unionidae

- Coelatura aegyptiaca (Cailliaud, 1827)

== See also ==
Lists of molluscs of surrounding countries:

- List of non-marine molluscs of Guinea, Wildlife of Guinea
- List of non-marine molluscs of Liberia, Wildlife of Liberia
