= List of non-marine molluscs of Cameroon =

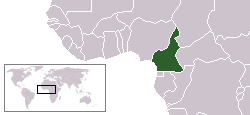
Location of Cameroon

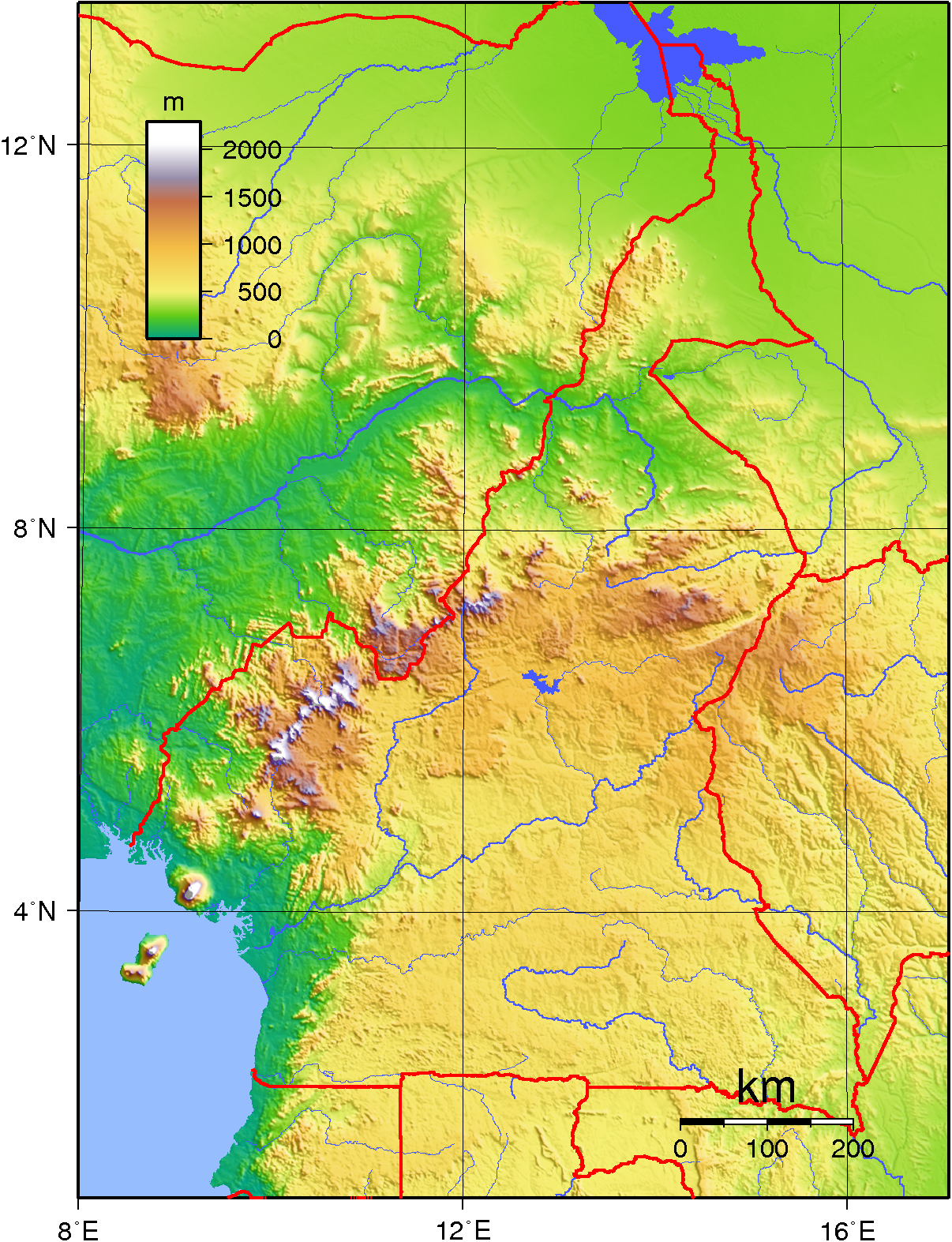
topography of Cameroon

The non-marine molluscs of Cameroon are a part of the molluscan fauna of Cameroon (wildlife of Cameroon).

A number of species of non-marine molluscs are found in the wild in Cameroon.

== Freshwater gastropods ==
Thiaridae

- Cleopatra bulimoides (Olivier, 1804)
- Melanoides tuberculata (Müller, 1774)

Ampullariidae

- Lanistes ovum Peters, 1845
- Pila wernei (Philippi, 1851)

Planorbidae

- Biomphalaria camerunensis (C.R. Boettger, 1941)
- Biomphalaria pfeifferi (Krauss, 1848)
- Bulinus camerunensis Mandahl-Barth, 1957
- Bulinus forskalii (Ehrenberg, 1831)
- Bulinus globosus (Morelet, 1866)
- Bulinus senegalensis Müller, 1781
- Ceratophallus natalensis (Krauss, 1848)

Lymnaeidae

- Radix natalensis (Krauss, 1848)

== Land gastropods ==
Land gastropods in Cameroon include:

Punctidae

- Punctum camerunense de Winter, 2017

Streptaxidae

- Avakubia fruticicola de Winter & Vastenhout, 2013
- Avakubia semenguei de Winter & Vastenhout, 2013
- Avakubia subacuminata de Winter & Vastenhout, 2013
- Costigulella primennilus de Winter, 2008
- Gulella kuiperi de Winter, 2007
- Sinistrexcisa cameruniae De Winter, Gomez & Prieto, 1999 - from Southwest Cameroon

== See also ==
- List of marine molluscs of Cameroon

Lists of molluscs of surrounding countries:

- List of non-marine molluscs of Nigeria, Wildlife of Nigeria
- List of non-marine molluscs of Chad, Wildlife of Chad
- List of non-marine molluscs of the Central African Republic, Wildlife of the Central African Republic
- List of non-marine molluscs of Equatorial Guinea, Wildlife of Equatorial Guinea
- List of non-marine molluscs of Gabon, Wildlife of Gabon
- List of non-marine molluscs of the Democratic Republic of the Congo, Wildlife of the Democratic Republic of the Congo
