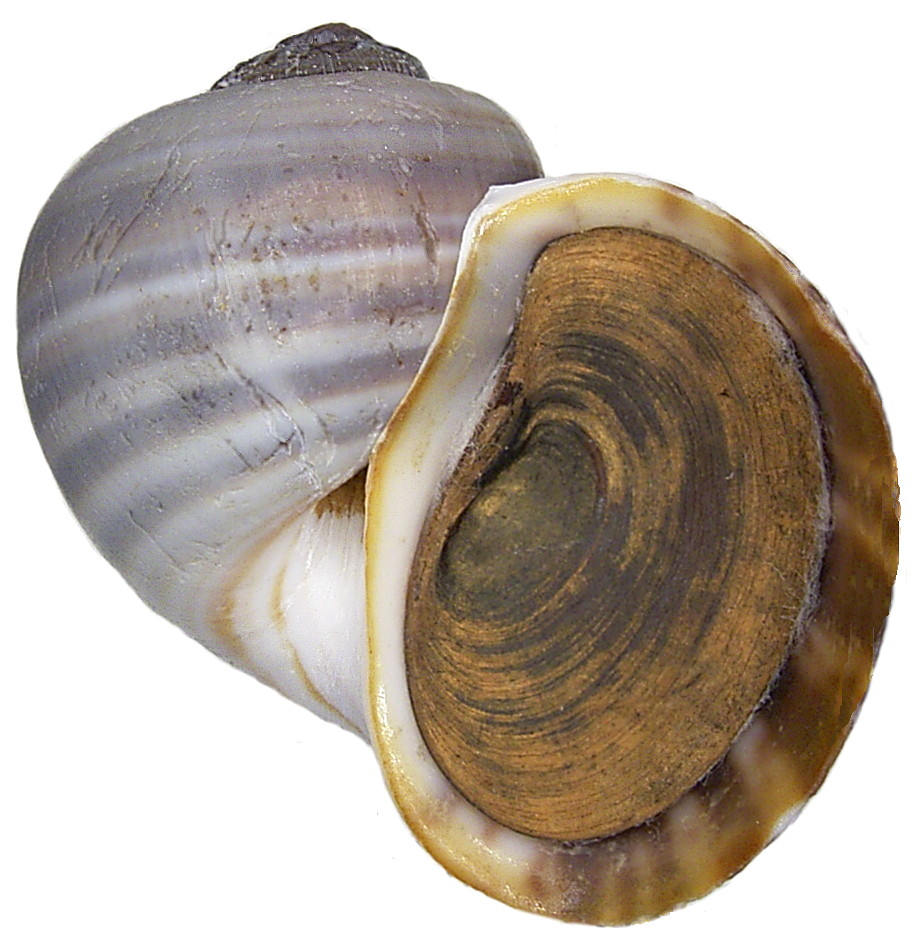
- The shell and operculum of Pila ampullacea

Conservation status
- Least Concern (IUCN 3.1)

Scientific classification
- Kingdom: Animalia
- Phylum: Mollusca
- Class: Gastropoda
- Subclass: Caenogastropoda
- Order: Architaenioglossa
- Family: Ampullariidae
- Genus: Pila
- Species: P. ampullacea

Binomial name
- Pila ampullacea (Linnaeus, 1758)

Synonyms
- Ampullaria ampullacea (Linnaeus, 1758); Ampullaria ampullacea var. javensis G. Nevill, 1885; Ampullaria fasciata Lamarck, 1822 (invalid: junior homonym of fasciata Roissy, 1805); Ampullaria gruneri Philippi, 1852 (junior synonym); Helix ampullacea Linnaeus, 1758 (original combination); Pachylabra ampullacea (Linnaeus, 1758); Pachylabra ampullacea var. saleyerensis Kobelt, 1912 (junior synonym); Pomacea orbata Perry, 1811 (junior synonym)

= Pila ampullacea =

Species of gastropod

Pila ampullacea, is a species of freshwater snail with an operculum, an aquatic gastropod mollusk in the family Ampullariidae, the apple snails.

== Distribution ==
This species occurs in Southeast Asia: Thailand, Vietnam, Laos, Indonesia, Malaysia, the Philippines

== Description ==
The height of the shell varies between 60 and 105 millimetres (2.4 and 4.1 in), its diameter between 50 and 100 millimetres (2.0 and 3.9 in).

(Original description in Latin) The shell is subumbilicate, subrotund, and smooth. Its whorls are more ventricose above, and the umbilicus is covered. The aperture is ovate-oblong.

(Described in Latin as Ampullaria gruneri) The shell is ovate-globose and umbilically perforated, appearing somewhat rugose and olive-colored. Brown zones are present, barely shining through the rather thick, very smooth epidermis. The spire nearly exceeds one-third of the total height. The whorls are rounded, with the body whorl being slightly more swollen in its upper part. The aperture is ovate-oblong and semilunate, displaying a yellowish-brown band. The peristome is slightly thickened internally and pale fulvous. The outer lip is straight, and the columellar margin is reflexed.

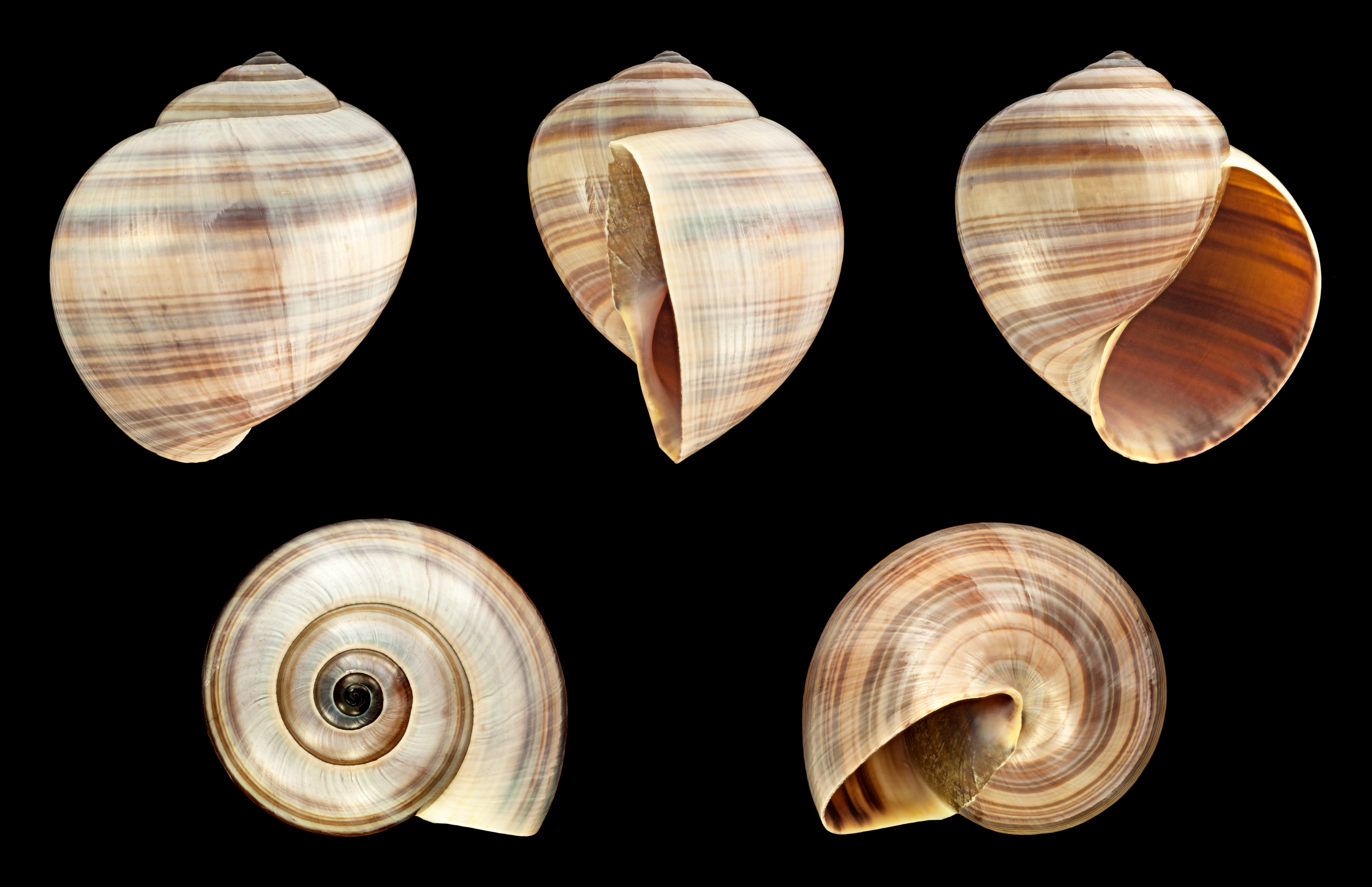
Five views of a shell of Pila ampullacea

== As food ==
Pila ampullacea, together with Pila pesmei, are indigenous rice field snail species traditionally eaten in Thailand that have been displaced by the invasive golden apple snail, Pomacea canaliculata. In Indonesia, it is famous as keong sawah or tutut (from Sundanese: ᮒᮥᮒᮥᮒ᮪, romanized: Tutut) as traditional cuisine which is often boiled or grilled as satay.
