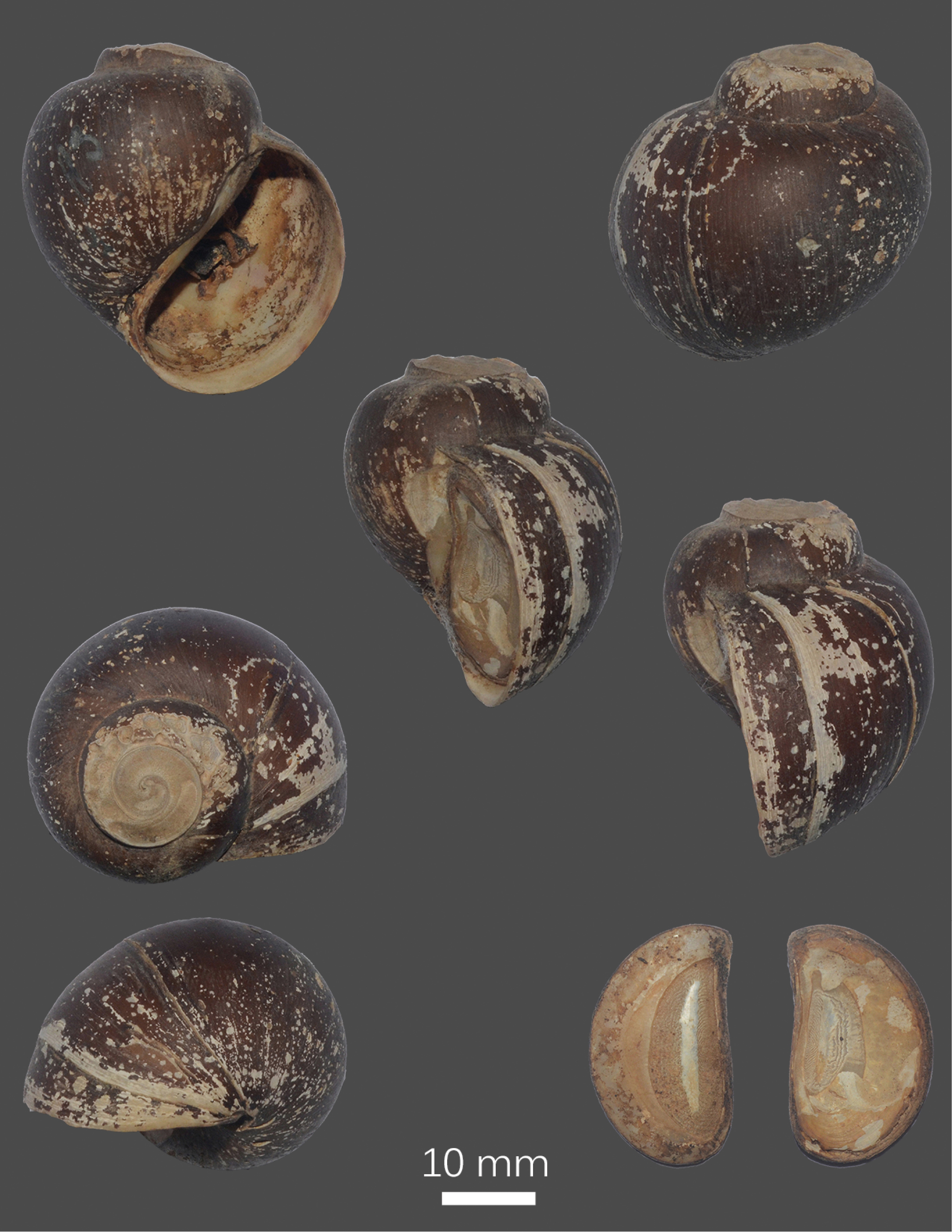
- Shell of Pila nevilliana

Conservation status
- Least Concern (IUCN 3.1)

Scientific classification
- Kingdom: Animalia
- Phylum: Mollusca
- Class: Gastropoda
- Subclass: Caenogastropoda
- Order: Architaenioglossa
- Family: Ampullariidae
- Genus: Pila
- Species: P. nevilliana

Binomial name
- Pila nevilliana (Annandale & Prashad, 1921)

Synonyms
- Pachylabra nevilliana Annandale & Prashad, 1921 (original combination)

= Pila nevilliana =

Species of gastropod

Pila nevilliana, is a species of freshwater snail with an operculum, an aquatic gastropod mollusk in the family Ampullariidae, the apple snails.

== Description ==
The length of the shell attains 35 millimetres (1.4 in), its diameter 28.5 millimetres (1.12 in).

(Original description) The species is considerably larger, stouter and more globose than Pila saxea (Reeve, 1856), the spire is more swollen, the body whorl more transverse, the aperture broader above, the suture more oblique and the sculpture of the shell coarser and less regular. The external colour is deep chestnut, with which the interior is also tinged. The peristome is white. The scar of the operculum is relatively smaller and its central ridge broader and flatter.

== Distribution ==
This species occurs in India.
