= S. formosa =

S. formosa may refer to:

- Segmentorbis formosa, a ram's horn snail
- Seguenzia formosa, a sea snail
- Sitta formosa, an Asian nuthatch
- Squatina formosa, an angel shark
- Swainsona formosa, an Australian plant
