= Pila bruguieri =

Conservation status
- Data Deficient (IUCN 3.1)

Scientific classification
- Kingdom: Animalia
- Phylum: Mollusca
- Class: Gastropoda
- Subclass: Caenogastropoda
- Order: Architaenioglossa
- Family: Ampullariidae
- Genus: Pila
- Species: P. bruguieri

Binomial name
- Pila bruguieri (Deshayes, 1830)

Synonyms
- Ampullaria bruguieri Deshayes, 1830 (original combination)

Species of gastropod

Pila bruguieri is a species of freshwater snail in the family Ampullariidae, the apple snails.

== Distribution ==
The type locality is Cayenne, French Guyana.

== Description ==
The shell can grow up to 72.5 millimetres (2.85 in).
