= Pila pygmaea =

Conservation status
- Least Concern (IUCN 3.1)

Scientific classification
- Kingdom: Animalia
- Phylum: Mollusca
- Class: Gastropoda
- Subclass: Caenogastropoda
- Order: Architaenioglossa
- Family: Ampullariidae
- Genus: Pila
- Species: P. pygmaea

Binomial name
- Pila pygmaea (Récluz, 1851)

Synonyms
- Ampullaria pygmaea Récluz, 1851 (original combination)

Species of gastropod

Pila pygmaea is a species of freshwater snail with an operculum, an aquatic gastropod mollusk in the family Ampullariidae, the apple snails.

== Description ==
The height of the shell attains 8 mm, its diameter 7 mm.

(Original description in French) The small, ovate-globular shell is very thin and perforated, appearing fawn-white or distinctly fawn, and reveals faint growth striae under a magnifying glass. It is formed of five convex whorls, which are broadly depressed above and almost flat. These whorls reveal, by transparency, a narrow, decurrent brownish-fawn band that, on the body whorl is located above the middle.

The spire is conical and acute. The suture is very narrow. The body whorl is bulging and higher than the spire. The aperture is half-round; the inner lip is almost straight; the outer lip is very thin, sharp, and sinuous above its middle. The umbilicus is moderate and semi-lunar. The operculum remains unknown.

== Distribution ==
This species occurs in India.
