= Pila decocta =

Scientific classification
- Kingdom: Animalia
- Phylum: Mollusca
- Class: Gastropoda
- Subclass: Caenogastropoda
- Order: Architaenioglossa
- Family: Ampullariidae
- Genus: Pila
- Species: P. decocta

Binomial name
- Pila decocta (Mabille, 1887)

Synonyms
- Ampullaria decocta Mabille, 1887 (original combination)

Species of gastropod

Pila decocta is a species of freshwater snail in the family Ampullariidae, the apple snails.

== Description ==
The shell can grow up to 28.9 millimetres (1.14 in) with a diameter of 24 millimetres (0.94 in).

(Original description in French) The shell is oval-shaped, featuring a very narrow umbilical slit. It is thin, barely solid, and greenish-gray, most often covered in silt. It is adorned with striations resembling small, fairly regularly spaced ribs.

Spire and whorls: The spire is mammillated, slightly obtuse at the apex, and excoriated, appearing not very prominent. There are five convex-inflated whorls, with very irregular growth: quite slow in the initial whorls, becoming very rapid in the later ones. The suture is simple but shallow. The body whorl is very large, obliquely globose, and inflated, not descending at its termination, and barely attenuated at the base.

Aperture and peristome: The aperture is oblique, oblong-semi-oval, narrowed at its extremities, and slightly angular superiorly. The columella is white, arched, and thickened. The peristome is acute, thickened, and interrupted, with its margins joined by a very thin lamina. The columellar lip is appressed, dilated into a callus that covers the umbilical region, while the outer lip is well curved and the basal lip is spread out.

== Distribution ==
The species occurs in Vietnam.
