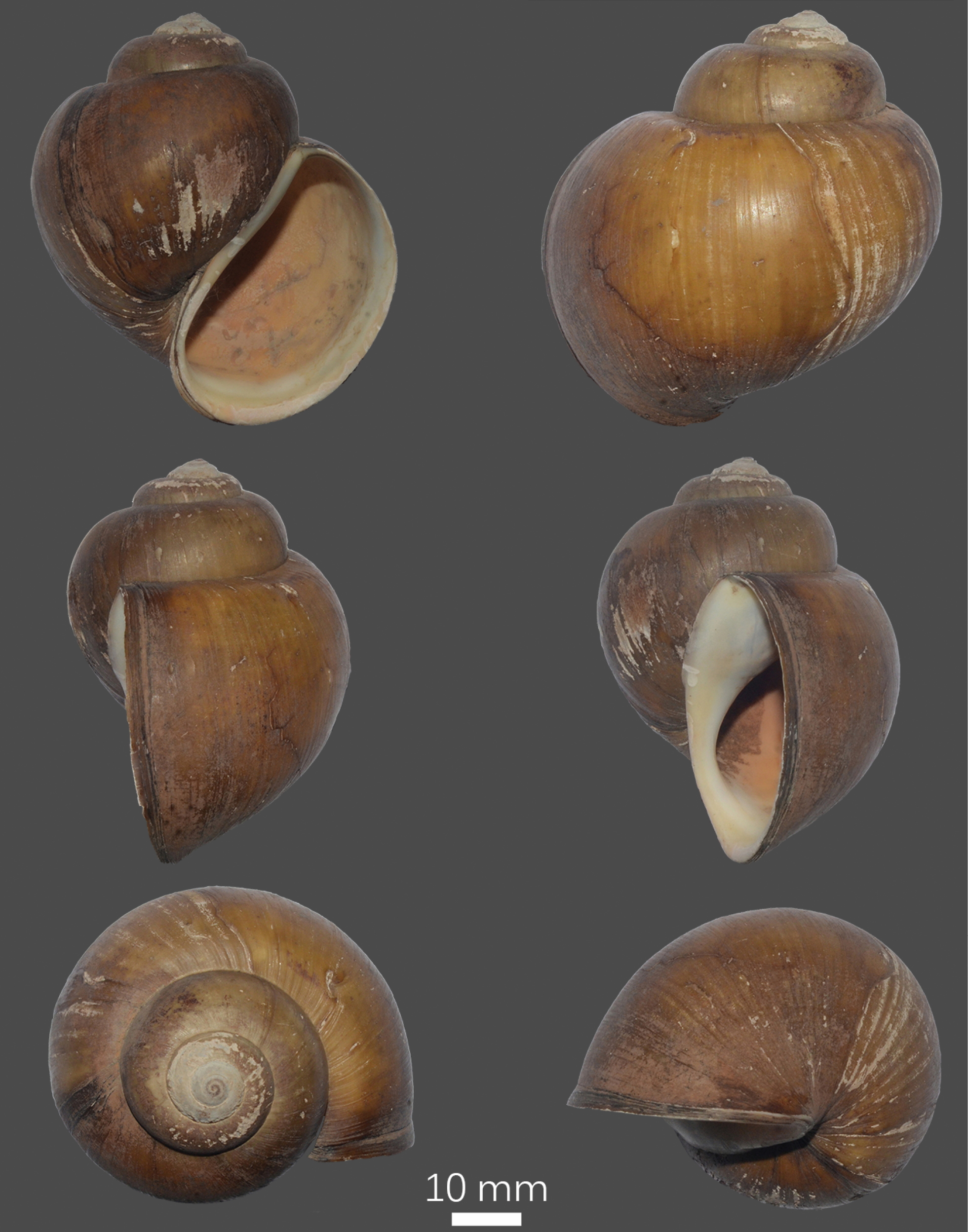

Conservation status
- Least Concern (IUCN 3.1)

- Secure (NatureServe)

Scientific classification
- Kingdom: Animalia
- Phylum: Mollusca
- Class: Gastropoda
- Subclass: Caenogastropoda
- Order: Architaenioglossa
- Family: Ampullariidae
- Genus: Pila
- Species: P. scutata

Binomial name
- Pila scutata (Mousson, 1848)

Synonyms
- Ampullaria borneensis R. A. Philippi, 185; Ampullaria compacta Reeve, 1856 junior subjective synonym; Ampullaria conica W. Wood, 1828 (invalid: junior homonym of Ampullaria conica Lamarck, 1804); Ampullaria conica var. expansa G. Nevill, 1877; Ampullaria javanica Reeve, 1856; Ampullaria orientalis R. A. Philippi, 1849; Ampullaria perakensis de Morgan, 1886; Ampullaria scutata Mousson, 1848 (original name); Ampullaria stoliczkana G. Nevill, 1877; Ampullaria wellesleyensis de Morgan, 1886; Pachylabra borneensis (R. A. Philippi, 1852) junior subjective synonym; Pachylabra conica (W. Wood, 1828) junior subjective synonym; Pachylabra javanica (Reeve, 1856); Pachylabra javanica var. fruhstorferi Kobelt, 1912; Pachylabra mainitensis Kobelt, 1912 (junior synonym); Pachylabra quadrasi Kobelt, 1912 (junior synonym); Pachylabra stoliczkana G. Nevill, 1877; Pila conica (W. Wood, 1828) junior subjective synonym; Pila conica f. compacta (Reeve, 1856) junior subjective synonym; Pila scutala [sic] misspelling - incorrect subsequent spelling

= Pila scutata =

Species of gastropod

Pila scutata is a species of gastropod belonging to the family Ampullariidae, the apple snails.

== Description ==
The height of the shell attains 39 mm, its diameter 35 mm.

(Original description in Latin) The shell is elongated-globose and narrowly perforated. It is transversely irregularly striated, brownish-green, and obsoletely banded. The spire is emergent, with its apex eroded, and the suture is scarcely deep.

The shell comprises 4.5 convex whorls. The body whorl is irregularly inflated and obscurely angular in the middle. The aperture is ovate, and its right margin is somewhat dilated. Internally, it appears yellowish and is banded with brownish-violet. The margin is acute and somewhat produced at the base.

The operculum is thick and calcareous. Externally, it is covered with a green, striated epidermis, while internally, it is pearly, with an elongated spot surrounded by a minutely vermiculate margin.

== Distribution ==
The species is found in Southeastern Asia and Central America. However, it has been taken from its native habitat to be used as a food delicacy, control of weeds in freshwater, a component in home aquariums, and as a vector for parasitic larva in the freshwater. This has made it very difficult to determine Pila scutata's true native range.
