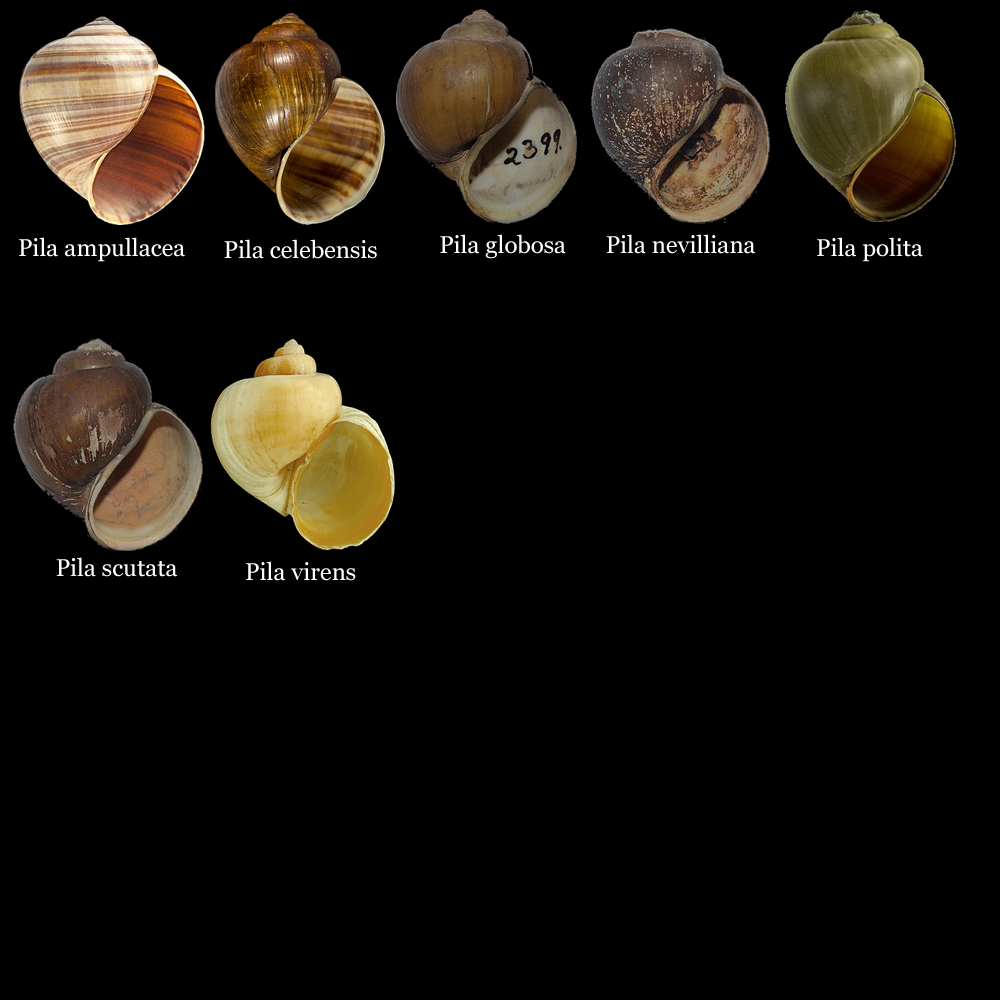
- Gallery of seven species of Pila

Scientific classification
- Kingdom: Animalia
- Phylum: Mollusca
- Class: Gastropoda
- Subclass: Caenogastropoda
- Order: Architaenioglossa
- Family: Ampullariidae
- Genus: Pila; Röding, 1798

Type species
- Helix ampullacea Linnaeus, 1758

Diversity
- about 30 species

Synonyms
- Ampullaria Lamarck, 1799; Ampullaria (Pachylabra) Swainson, 1840 (original rank); Ampullaria (Pomus) Gray, 1847 (unaccepted combination); Ampullarius Montfort, 1810 (invalid: unjustified emendation of Ampullaria); Ampullarius (Ampullarius) Montfort, 1810 (invalid: unjustified emendation to Ampullaria Lamarck, 1799); † Ampullopsis Repelin, 1902 (junior subjective synonym); Pachychilus Philippi, 1851 (unjustified emendation of Pachylabra); Pachylabra Swainson, 1840 (unnecessary nom. nov. pro Pachystoma Guilding, 1828); Pachystoma Guilding, 1828; Pila (Turbinicola) Annandale & Prashad, 1921; Pomus Gray, 1847; Turbinicola Annandale & Prashad, 1921

= Pila (gastropod) =

Genus of gastropods

Pila is a genus of large freshwater snails with an operculum, African and Asian apple snails, aquatic gastropod mollusks in the family Ampullariidae, the apple snails.

== Description ==
(Described in Latin as Pachystoma) Head and sensory organs:

The head is proboscis-shaped, free, large, and transversely wrinkled. Its cheeks expand into two tentacle-like lobes. The aperture is anterior, with folded lips. The mandibles are cartilaginous and appear swollen with strong muscles. The tongue is covered by elongated skin, and features numerous transverse ossicles in the middle, with anteriorly winged sides. The eyes are pedunculated (stalked), located at the external base of the tentacles. Two true tentacles are present, which are very long, bristly, and somewhat contractile.

Foot and operculum:

The foot is flattened and broad, with a subtriangular sole that is anteriorly margined and truncated. The operculum is horny, located on the dorsal side of the foot; it displays subtly concentric folds and a lateral-median nucleus.

Mantle and respiration:

The mantle is large and free; under the neck, it transforms into an elongated, flattened, retractor white muscle. The respiratory opening is large, situated under the mantle above the left siphon. The gills are comb-shaped, right-sided, and located under the mantle. An elongated fringe runs parallel to the rectum and oviduct. The respiratory organ (or respiratory antrum) is very large, dorsal, and sac-like, perforated above the very long siphon. The neck is equipped on both sides with broad, flattened wings, which are almost convoluted into two siphons. The left siphon, situated before the respiratory opening, inhales air, while the right, located under the anus, exhales and expels feces.

Anus and reproductive organ:

The anus is contractile, with an elongated rectum. The penis is exserted, very large, and fleshy, situated under the mantle margin on the right side near the anus (in males). Its apex is attenuated, and its base is appendiculated and gland-bearing; the appendix is perforated.

Shell characteristics:

The shell is right-handed, covered, delicate, longitudinally plicate, globose, and very ventricose (swollen). The spire is depressed or short; the body whorl is very large, and the base is broadly umbilicated. The peristome is simple, always thin, and rarely somewhat reflexed. The aperture is entire, oblong, very large, and expanded.

Movement and habits: Its movement is sluggish. When it needs to breathe, it seeks the surface and convolutes the left wing of the neck into a rigid tube. While it inhales, it flexes its tentacles and slowly retracts its head, receiving air at the tip of the siphon. It is tenacious of life.

== Distribution ==
Distribution of the genus Pila include Africa, Madagascar, southern Asia and Indo-Pacific islands. It is amphibious in nature and can undergo summer sleep or aestivation under drought condition. It is generally found in lakes, pools, and sometimes even in the river streams where aquatic vegetation like Vallisneria, Pistia are found in large amount for food.

== External features ==
When viewed from ventral side facing the columella towards the observer, the columella rotates clockwise or dextral.

== Species ==
Species within the genus Pila include:

- Pila africana (v. Martens, 1886)
- Pila ampullacea (Linnaeus, 1758) - type species
- Pila aperta (Philippi, 1849)
- † Pila assermoensis (Jodot, 1953)
- Pila bruguieri (Deshayes, 1830)
- † Pila busserti Harzhauser & Neubauer in Harzhauser et al., 2017
- Pila cecillei (Philipi, 1848)
- † Pila celebensis (Quoy & Gaimard, 1834)
- † Pila colchesteri Cox, 1933
- Pila decocta (Mabille, 1887)
- † Pila falloti (Jodot, 1953)
- † Pila faujasii (Serres, 1829)
- † Pila fukamiensis Iwasaki, 1980
- † Pila gauthieri (Jodot, 1953)
- Pila globosa (Swainson, 1822)
- Pila gracilis (I. Lea, 1856)
- † Pila lapparenti (J.-C. Fischer, 1963)
- Pila mizoramensis Sil, Basak, Karanth & Aravind, 2021
- † Pila mutungi Van Damme & Pickford, 1995
- † Pila neuberti Harzhauser & Neubauer in Harzhauser et al., 2016
- Pila nevilliana (Annandale & Prashad, 1921)
- † Pila nipponica T. Kobayashi & K. Suzuki, 1937
- Pila occidentalis (Mousson, 1887)
- Pila olea (Reeve, 1856)
- Pila ovata (Olivier, 1804)
- Pila pesmei (Morelet, 1889)
- Pila pygmaea (Récluz, 1851)
- Pila robsoni Prashad, 1925
- Pila saxea (Reeve, 1856)
- Pila scutata (Mousson, 1848)
- Pila speciosa (Philippi, 1849)
- † Pila tikarkasensis (J.-C. Fischer, 1963)
- Pila turbinis (I. Lea, 1856)
- Pila virens (Lamarck, 1822)
- Pila virescens (Deshayes, 1824)
- Pila wernei (Philipi, 1851)

Synonyms

- Pila aldersoni Pain, 1946: synonym of Pomacea aldersoni (Pain, 1946) (original combination)
- Pila angelica (Annandale, 1920): synonym of Pila celebensis (Quoy & Gaimard, 1834)
- Pila brohardi (Granger, 1892): synonym of Pila virescens (Deshayes, 1824)
- Pila conica (Wood, 1828): synonym of Pila scutata (Mousson, 1848)
- Pila gradata (E. A. Smith, 1881): synonym of Pila ovata (Olivier, 1804)
- Pila hollingsworthi T. Pain, 1946: synonym of Pomacea hollingsworthi (Pain, 1946) (original combination)
- Pila polita (Deshayes, 1830): synonym of Pila virescens (Deshayes, 1824)
- † Pila selvensis (Vidal, 1917) †: synonym of † Selvovum selvense (Vidal, 1917)

Taxa inquirenda

- Pila congoensis Pilsbry & Bequaert, 1927
- Pila huberi Thach, 2020 (debated synonym)
- Pila microglypta Pilsbry & Bequaert, 1927
- † Pila pisum (Coquand, 1860)
- Pila theobaldi (Hanley, 1876)

== Ecology ==
Pila species are a host of a trematode Multicotyle purvisi.

== Human use ==
The shells of Pila are used in traditional ethnomedicine for weakness by Saharia people in Rajasthan, India.

Pila ampullacea and Pila pesmei are some of the rice field snail species traditionally eaten in Thailand that have been displaced by the invasive golden apple snail, Pomacea canaliculata.
