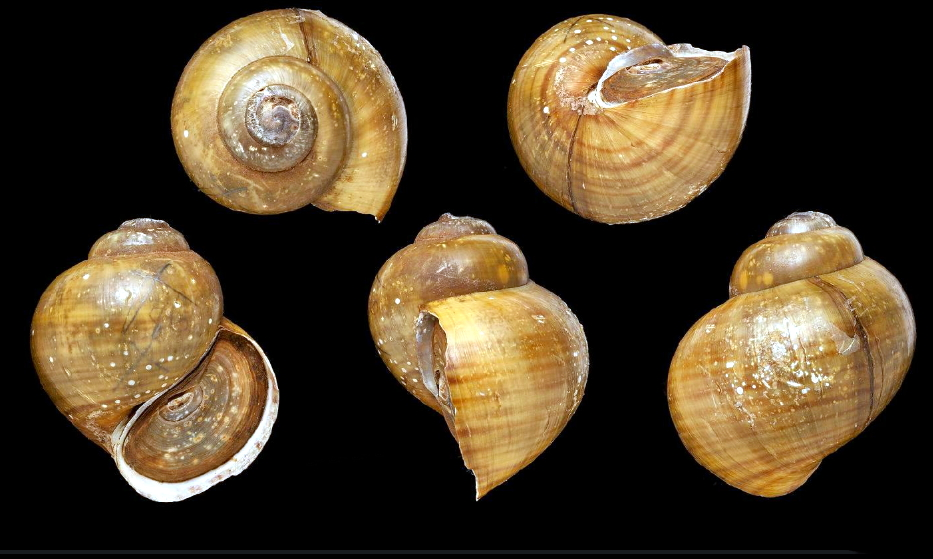
- Shell of Pila gracilis (specimen at the Museum of Natural History, London)

Conservation status
- Least Concern (IUCN 3.1)

Scientific classification
- Kingdom: Animalia
- Phylum: Mollusca
- Class: Gastropoda
- Subclass: Caenogastropoda
- Order: Architaenioglossa
- Family: Ampullariidae
- Genus: Pila
- Species: P. gracilis

Binomial name
- Pila gracilis (I. Lea, 1856)

Synonyms
- Ampullaria complicata Reeve, 1856 (junior synonym); Ampullaria gracilis I. Lea, 1856 (original combination); Pachylabra gracilis (I. Lea, 1856) superseded combination

= Pila gracilis =

Species of gastropod

Pila gracilis, is a species of freshwater snail with an operculum, an aquatic gastropod mollusk in the family Ampullariidae, the apple snails.

== Distribution ==
This species occurs in southeast Asia: Thailand, Malaysia, Vietnam, Laos, the Philippines.

== Description ==
The height of the shell varies between 35 and 40 millimetres (1.4 and 1.6 in).

(Original description in Latin) The shell is regularly elliptical and yellowish-olive, transversely banded throughout. It is rather thin, narrowly umbilicate, smooth, and shiny. The spire is emergent, and the sutures are slightly impressed. The shell contains about six somewhat convex whorls. The aperture is ovate, dark brown internally, and obsoletely banded. The outer lip is acute, the umbilicus is strongly compressed, and the columella is smooth.
