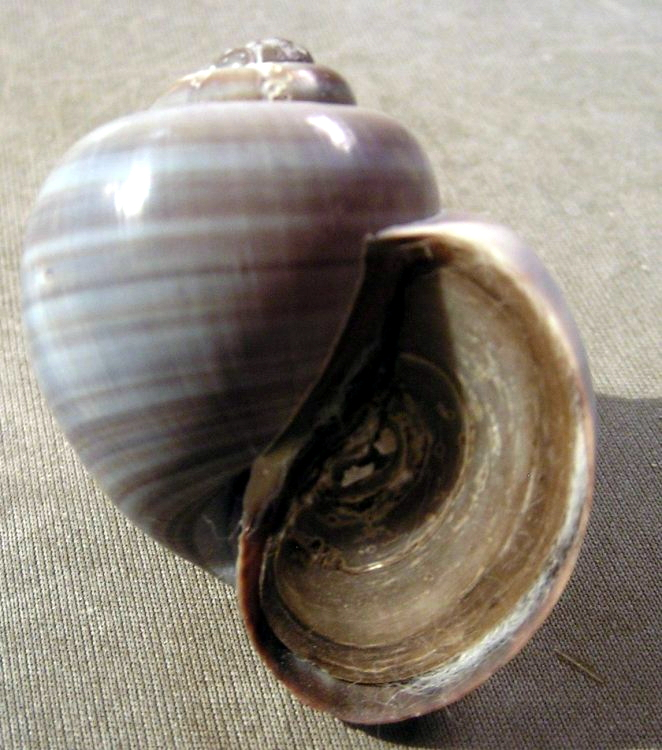
- Shell of Pila africana

Conservation status
- Least Concern (IUCN 3.1)The IUCN Red List of Threatened Species

Scientific classification
- Kingdom: Animalia
- Phylum: Mollusca
- Class: Gastropoda
- Subclass: Caenogastropoda
- Order: Architaenioglossa
- Family: Ampullariidae
- Genus: Pila
- Species: P. africana

Binomial name
- Pila africana (E. von Martens, 1886)

Synonyms
- Ampullaria africana E. von Martens, 1886 (original combination)

= Pila africana =

Species of gastropod

Pila africana, is a species of freshwater snail with an operculum, an aquatic gastropod mollusk in the family Ampullariidae, the apple snails.

== Distribution ==
This species occurs in West Africa in Ghana, Liberia, Ivory Coast and in Chad

== Description ==
The height of the shell varies between 35 and 40 millimetres (1.4 and 1.6 in), its diameter between 32 and 38 millimetres (1.3 and 1.5 in).

(Original description in Latin) The shell is globose and perforate, appearing chestnut-brown or blackish, and shows very fine spiral striations under a lens. It may have no bands, or they might be obsolete. The spire is short, eroded, and abraded. It comprises four convex whorls, separated by a deep suture. The body whorl is inflated and slightly attenuated at the base. The aperture is ovate-elliptical, occupying three-quarters of the shell's length, slightly broader below, and rounded at the base, with more than half of the lower part of the columellar margin being free and yellowish.
