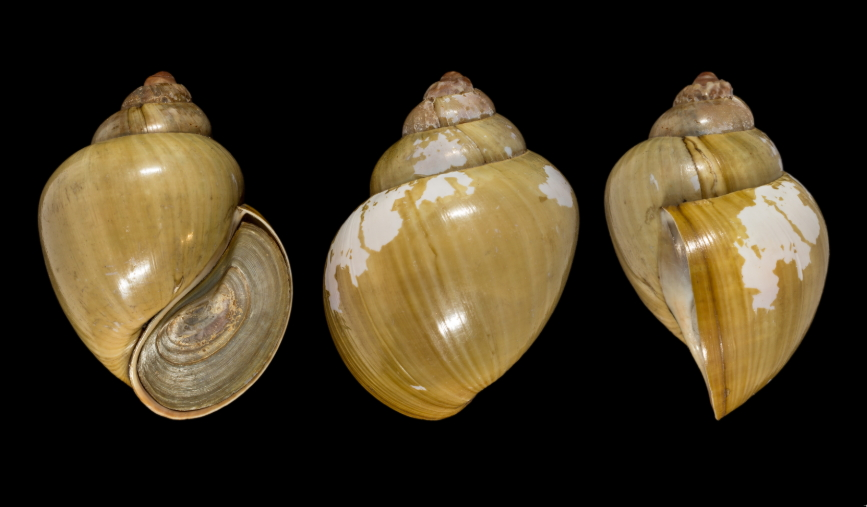
- Shell of Pila virescens (holotype at MNHN, Paris)

Conservation status
- Data Deficient (IUCN 3.1)

Scientific classification
- Kingdom: Animalia
- Phylum: Mollusca
- Class: Gastropoda
- Subclass: Caenogastropoda
- Order: Architaenioglossa
- Family: Ampullariidae
- Genus: Pila
- Species: P. virescens

Binomial name
- Pila virescens (Deshayes, 1824)

Synonyms
- Ampullaria brohardi Granger, 1892 (junior synonym); Ampullaria callistoma Morelet, 1866 junior subjective synonym; Ampullaria pagoda Morelet, 1865 (junior synonym); Ampullaria polita Deshayes, 1830 (unnecessary substitute name for Ampullaria virescens); Ampullaria polita var. compressa G. Nevill, 1885 (junior synonym); Ampullaria polita var. major Dautzenberg & H. Fischer, 1906 (junior synonym); Ampullaria virescens Deshayes, 1824 (original combination); Pachylabra polita (Deshayes, 1830) superseded combination; Pila polita (Deshayes, 1830)

= Pila virescens =

Species of gastropod

Pila virescens is a species of freshwater snail in the family Ampullariidae, the apple snails.

== Description ==
The shell can grow quite large, up to 95 mm, its diameter 68 mm.

(Original description in Latin of Ampullaria pagoda ) The shell is perforated, ovate-globose, and unequally rugose. It is olive-colored, longitudinally marked with a few brownish or reddish streaks, and appears purplish-violet internally. The spire is exserted, conical, and acute at the apex, displaying a purplish-blackish hue. It comprises nearly six convex whorls, with the body whorl being ventricose and then attenuated. The aperture is ovate-oblong, mediocre, and somewhat effuse at the base. The peristome is internally thickened, and the columellar margin is dilated, briefly projecting, and rubricated. The external margin is black-limbed. The operculum is testaceous and thick.

== Distribution ==
No type locality is given (Manila, the Philippines ?). Ampullaria pagoda has been reported in Cambodia.
