= Pila mizoramensis =

Conservation status
- Least Concern (IUCN 3.1)

Scientific classification
- Kingdom: Animalia
- Phylum: Mollusca
- Class: Gastropoda
- Subclass: Caenogastropoda
- Order: Architaenioglossa
- Family: Ampullariidae
- Genus: Pila
- Species: P. mizoramensis

Binomial name
- Pila mizoramensis Sil, Basak, Karanth & Aravind, 2021

Species of gastropod

Pila mizoramensis, is a species of freshwater snail with an operculum, an aquatic gastropod mollusk in the family Ampullariidae, the apple snails.

== Distribution ==
This species occurs in northeast India.
