= Pseudomulleria =

Conservation status
- Endangered (IUCN 3.1)

Scientific classification
- Kingdom: Animalia
- Phylum: Mollusca
- Class: Bivalvia
- Order: Unionida
- Family: Etheriidae
- Genus: Pseudomulleria; R. Anthony, 1907
- Species: P. dalyi

Binomial name
- Pseudomulleria dalyi (E. A. Smith, 1898)

Genus of bivalves

Pseudomulleria dalyi is a species of bivalves in the Etheriidae family which is endemic to India. Its natural habitat is rivers. It is threatened by habitat loss. It is the only species in the genus Pseudomulleria.
