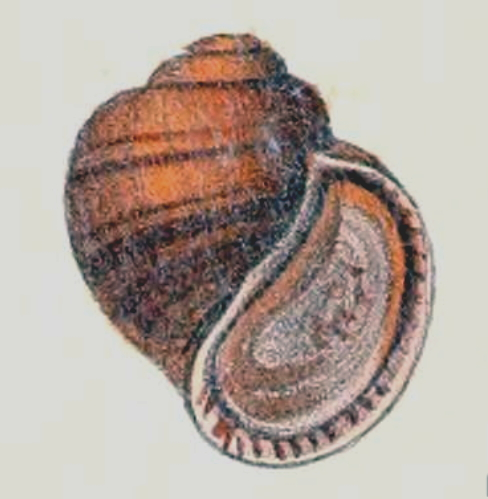
- drawing of a shell of Pila olea (holotype)

Conservation status
- Data Deficient (IUCN 3.1)

Scientific classification
- Kingdom: Animalia
- Phylum: Mollusca
- Class: Gastropoda
- Subclass: Caenogastropoda
- Order: Architaenioglossa
- Family: Ampullariidae
- Genus: Pila
- Species: P. olea

Binomial name
- Pila olea (Reeve, 1856)

Synonyms
- Ampullaria olea Reeve, 1856 superseded combination

= Pila olea =

Species of gastropod

Pila olea, common name the olive ampullaria, is a species of freshwater snail with an operculum, an aquatic gastropod mollusk in the apple snails family, Ampullariidae.

== Description ==
(Original description) The shell is subglobose and scarcely umbilicated, with a rather short spire. Its whorls are rounded and longitudinally striated. It appears shining olive, encircled with two distant, narrow, blackish-red bands. The aperture is pyriformly oval.

== Distribution ==
This species is found in India.
