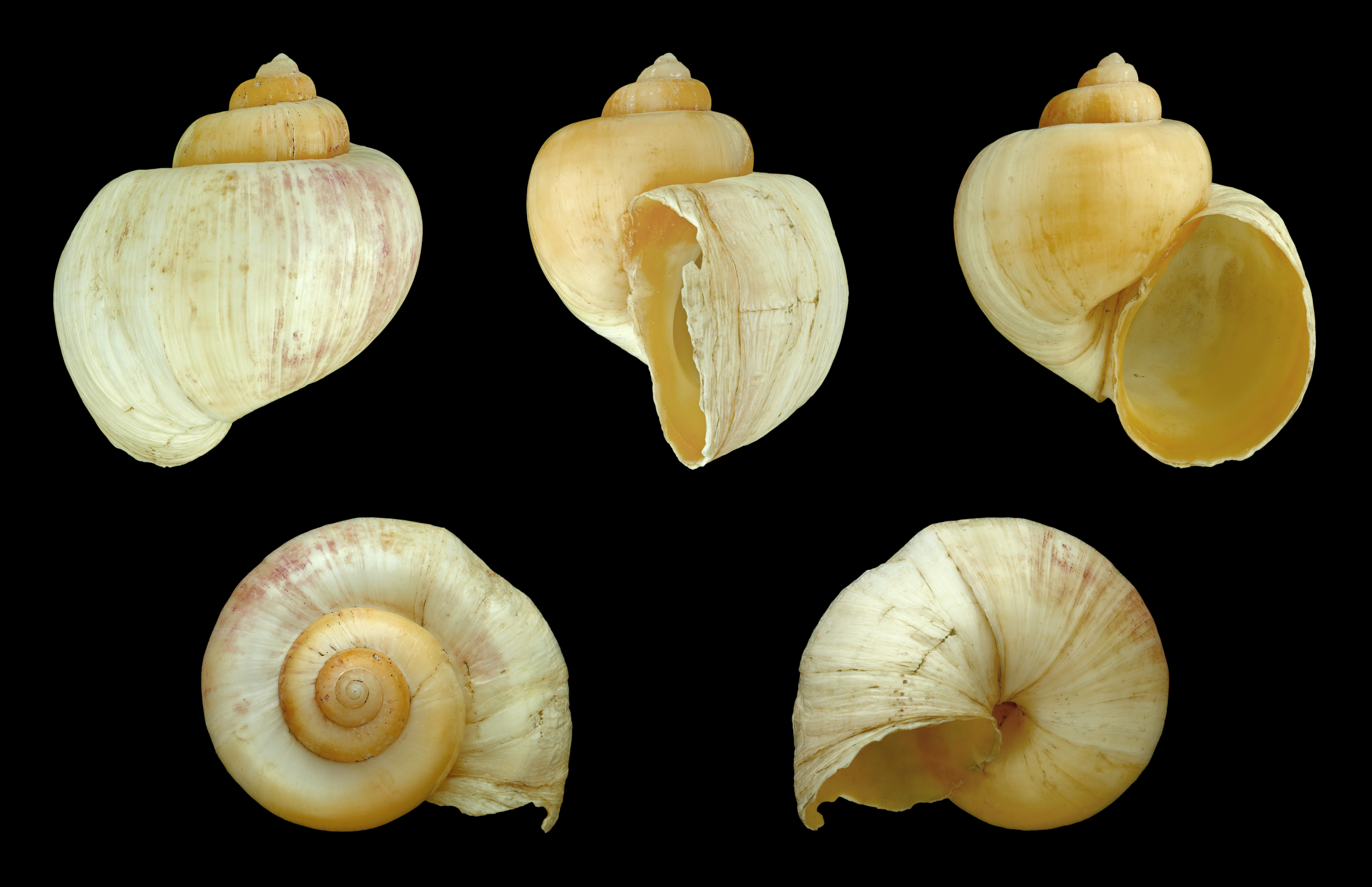
- Pila virens shell

Conservation status
- Least Concern (IUCN 3.1)

Scientific classification
- Kingdom: Animalia
- Phylum: Mollusca
- Class: Gastropoda
- Subclass: Caenogastropoda
- Order: Architaenioglossa
- Family: Ampullariidae
- Genus: Pila
- Species: P. virens

Binomial name
- Pila virens (Lamarck, 1822)

Synonyms
- Ampullaria malabarica R. A. Philippi, 1852 junior subjective synonym; Ampullaria pallens R. A. Philippi, 1849 junior subjective synonym; Ampullaria virens Lamarck, 1822 (basionym)

= Pila virens =

Species of gastropod

Pila virens is a species of freshwater snail in the family Ampullariidae, the apple snails.

== Description ==
The height of the shell attains 36.1 mm, its diameter 31.9 mm.

(Original description in Latin) The green shell is globose, ventricose, and subperforate. The spire is short, and it comprises five whorls, with the body whorl being very large. The aperture is reddish, and its margins are white.

(Described in Latin as Ampullaria malabarica) The smooth shell is ovate and narrowly umbilicate. it is olive-colored and unicolored. The spire nearly equals one-third of the total height and is somewhat tabulated. The whorls are horizontal at the suture, and there appear radially somewhat rugose, with the body whorl being slightly attenuated towards the base. The aperture is ovate-oblong, and the peristome is internally thickened.

== Distribution ==
This species occurs in India, Bangladesh, Thailand and Sri Lanka.
