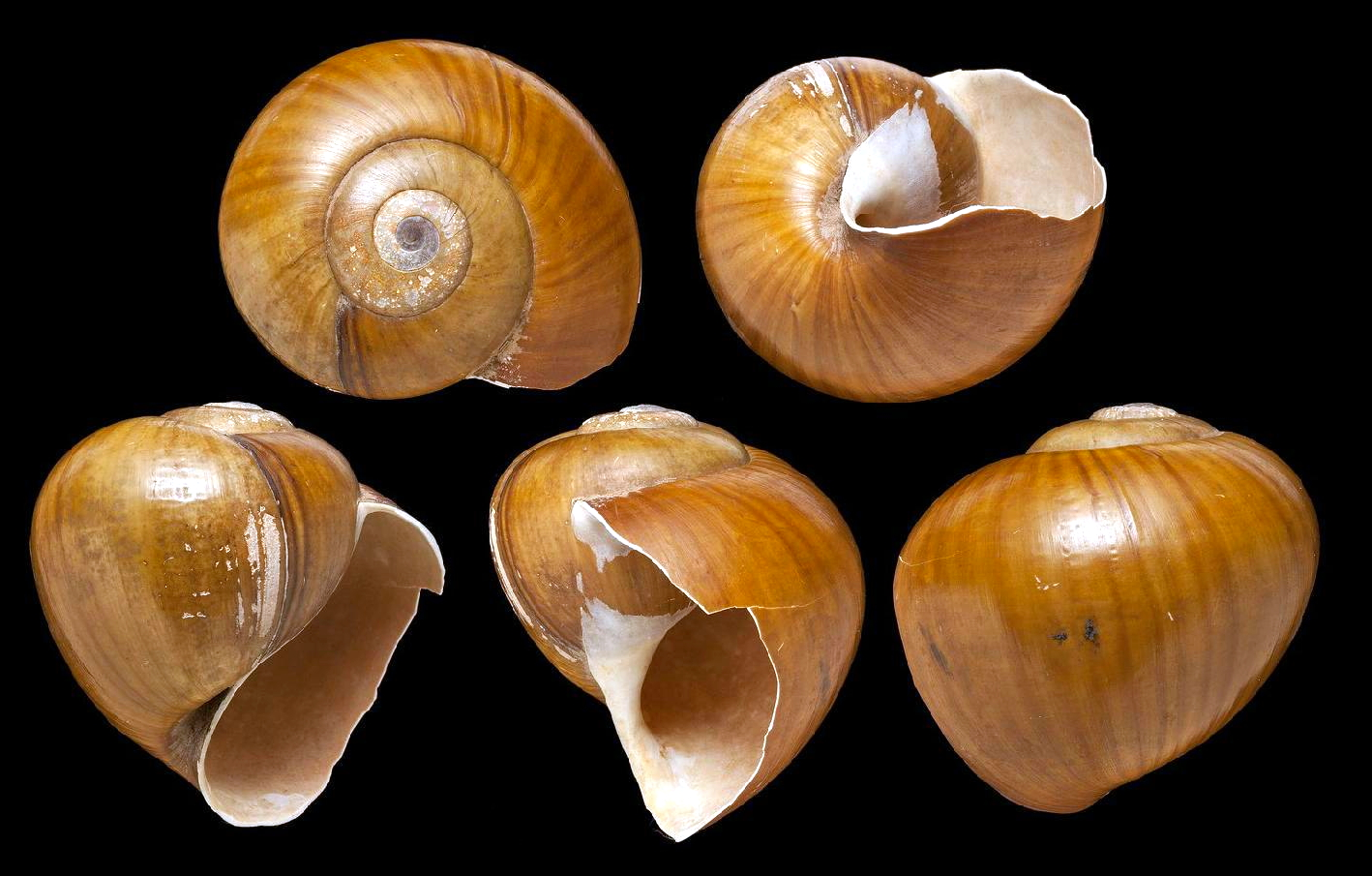
- Pila turbinis shell (holotype at the Natural History Museum, London)

Conservation status
- Data Deficient (IUCN 3.1)

Scientific classification
- Kingdom: Animalia
- Phylum: Mollusca
- Class: Gastropoda
- Subclass: Caenogastropoda
- Order: Architaenioglossa
- Family: Ampullariidae
- Genus: Pila
- Species: P. turbinis

Binomial name
- Pila turbinis (I. Lea, 1856)

Synonyms
- Ampullaria dalyi W. T. Blanford, 1903 (junior synonym); Ampullaria turbinis I. Lea, 1856 (original combination); Pachylabra turbinis (I. Lea, 1856)

= Pila turbinis =

Species of gastropod

Pila turbinis is a species of freshwater snail in the family Ampullariidae, the apple snails.

== Description ==
(Original description in Latin) The shell is turbinate, yellowish-green, and transversely banded. It is rather thick, imperforate, and smooth. The shell contains five very convex whorls. The spire is very depressed, and the sutures are slightly impressed. The aperture is very large and elongated-ovate, appearing either white or yellow, and is banded internally. The lip is acute, and the columella is very incurved and thickened.

== Distribution ==
This species occurs in Thailand.
