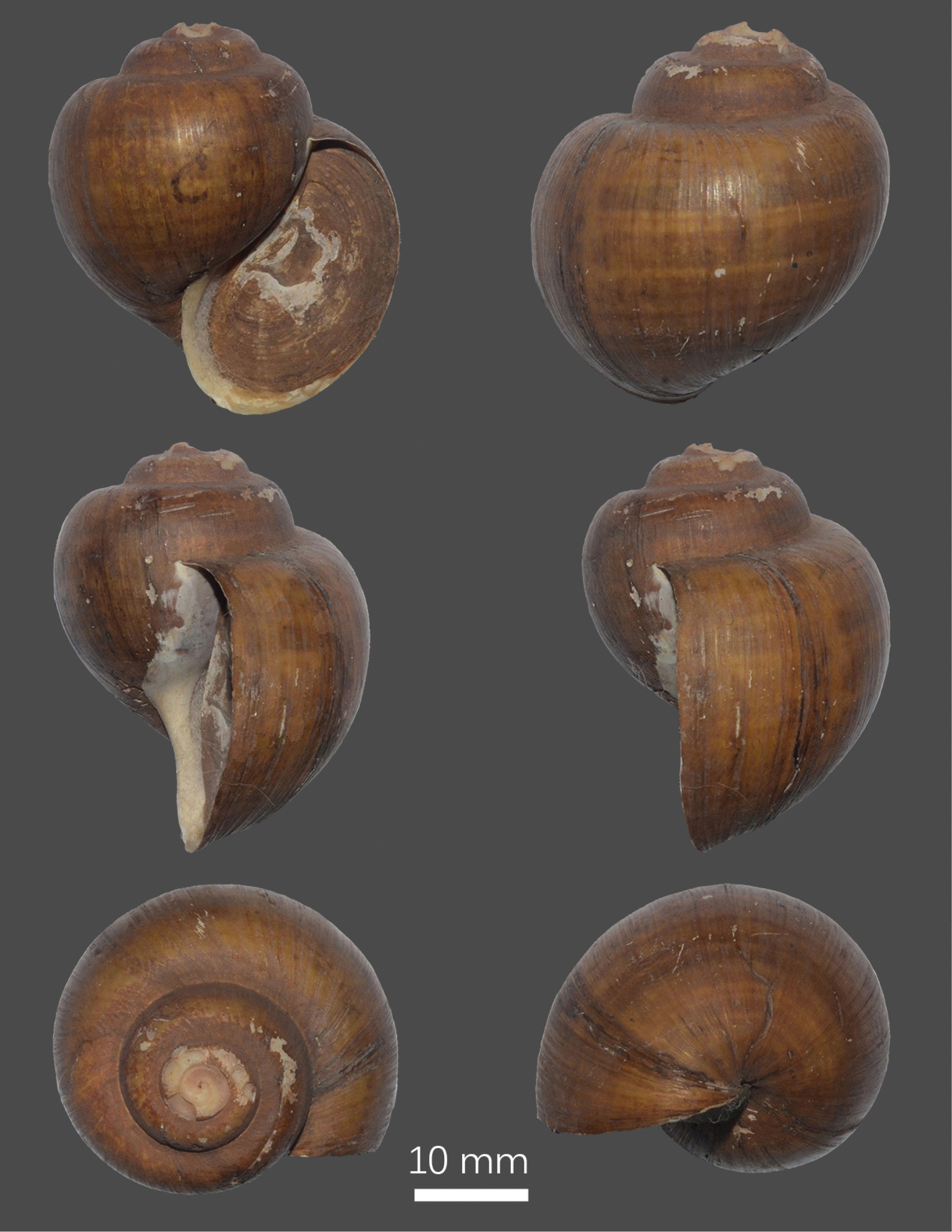
- Shell of Pila robsoni

Conservation status
- Least Concern (IUCN 3.1)

Scientific classification
- Kingdom: Animalia
- Phylum: Mollusca
- Class: Gastropoda
- Subclass: Caenogastropoda
- Order: Architaenioglossa
- Family: Ampullariidae
- Genus: Pila
- Species: P. robsoni

Binomial name
- Pila robsoni Prashad, 1925

= Pila robsoni =

Species of gastropod

Pila robsoni is a species of freshwater snail with an operculum, an aquatic gastropod mollusk in the family Ampullariidae, the apple snails.

== Description ==
The height of the shell attains 33.9 mm, its diameter 30 mm.

== Distribution ==
This species occurs in Sri Lanka.
