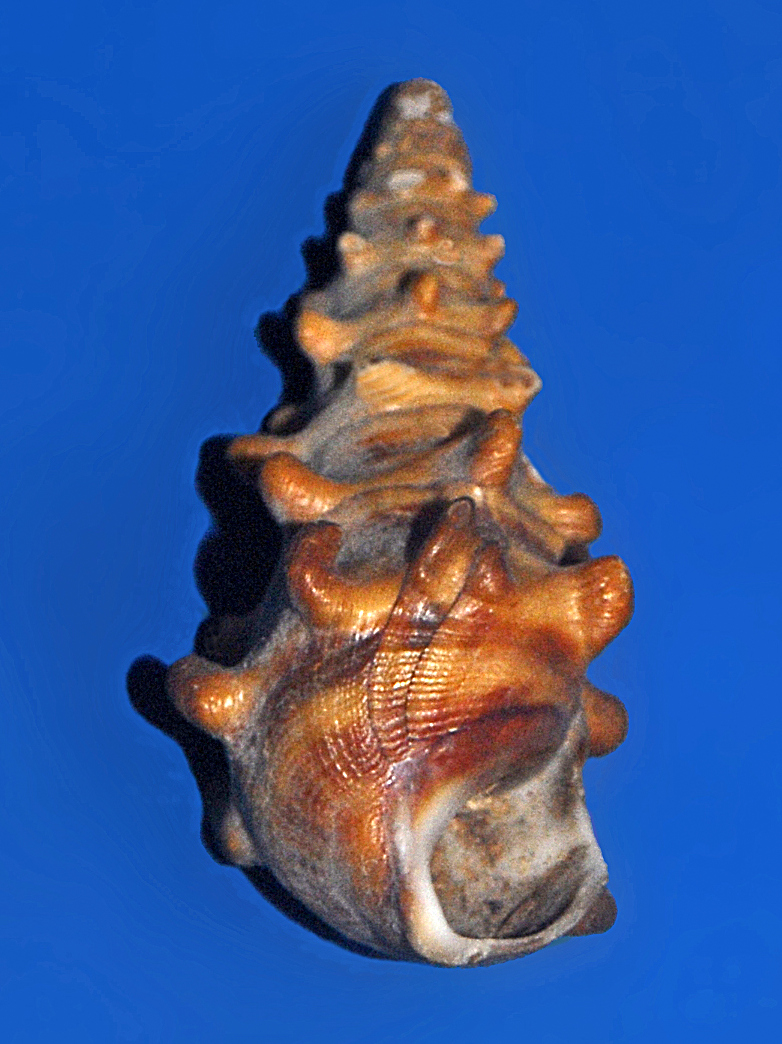
- Pachymelania aurita shell

Scientific classification
- Kingdom: Animalia
- Phylum: Mollusca
- Class: Gastropoda
- Subclass: Caenogastropoda
- Order: incertae sedis
- Family: Hemisinidae
- Genus: Pachymelania; E. A. Smith, 1893

= Pachymelania =

Genus of gastropods

Pachymelania is a genus of freshwater snails, gastropod mollusks in the family Hemisinidae.

== Species ==
Species within the genus Pachymelania include:

- Pachymelania aurita (O. F. Müller, 1774)
- Pachymelania byronensis Gray
- Pachymelania fusca (Gmelin, 1790)
