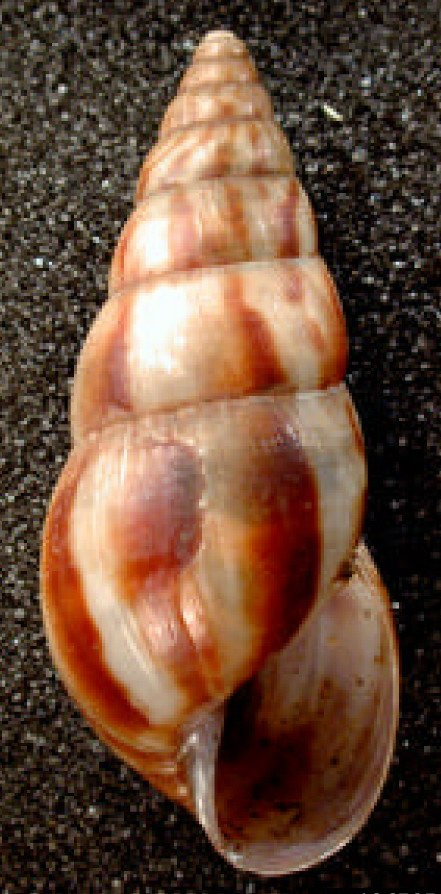
- Apertural view of a shell of Limicolaria aurora

Scientific classification
- Kingdom: Animalia
- Phylum: Mollusca
- Class: Gastropoda
- Order: Stylommatophora
- Family: Achatinidae
- Genus: Limicolaria; Schumacher, 1817

= Limicolaria =

Genus of gastropods

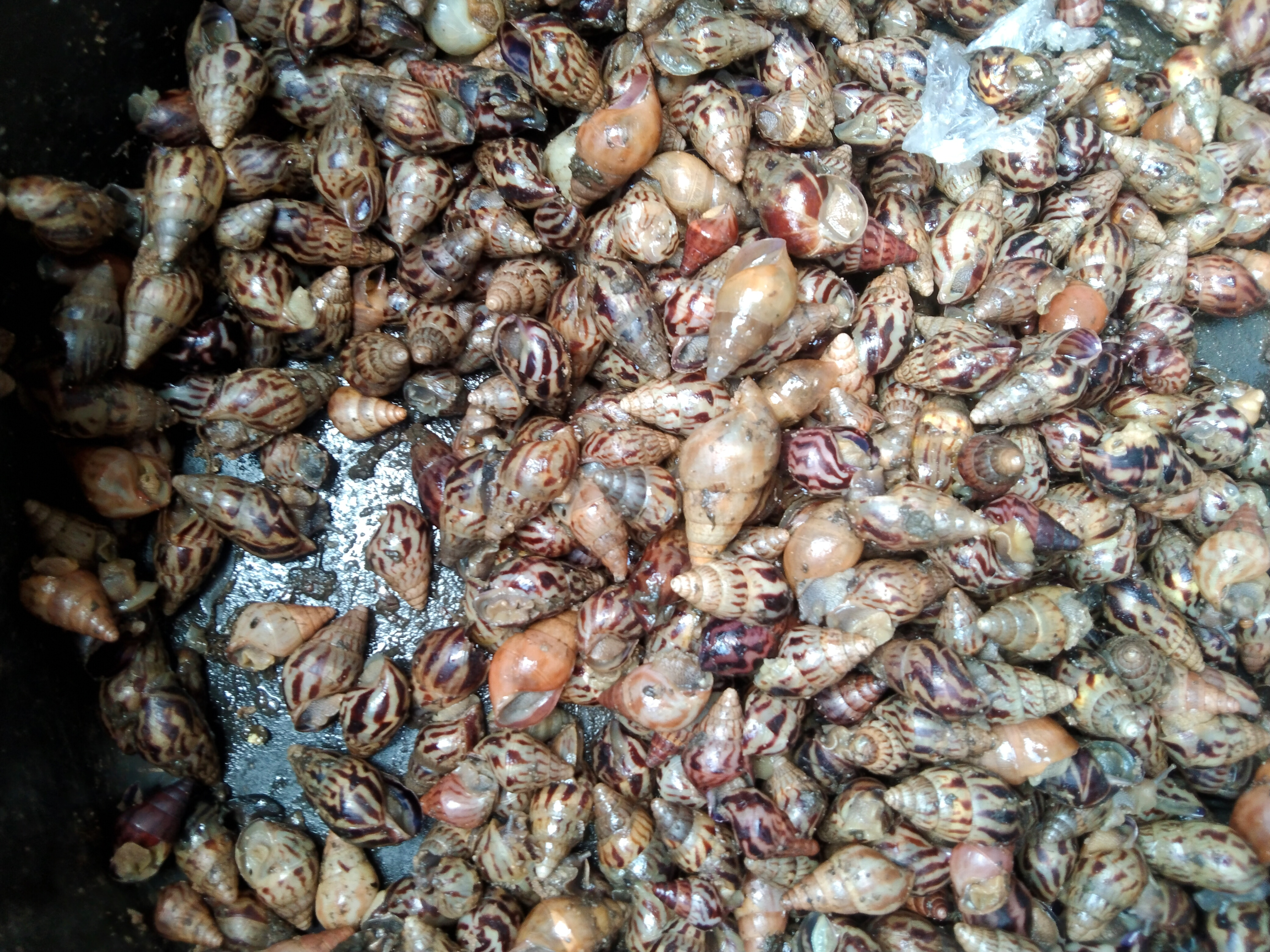
Limicolaria sold on a market in Nigeria

Limicolaria is a genus of tropical air-breathing land snails, terrestrial pulmonate gastropod mollusks in the family Achatinidae.

== Species ==
Species within the genus Limacolaria include:

- Limicolaria abinsiensis Shackleford and Spence 1916
- Limicolaria adansoni Pfeiffer, 1861
- Limicolaria aurora Jay, 1839 - Cameroun, Senegal
- Limicolaria cailliaudi Pfeiffer
- Limicolaria charbonnieri Bourguignat, 1889 - Congo
- Limicolaria dimidiata Martens, 1880 - Sudan
- Limicolaria distincta Putzeys, 1898 - Congo
- Limicolaria flammea Müller, 1774 - Nigeria
  - Limicolaria flammea festiva von Martens, 1869 - Sierra Leone
  - Limicolaria flammea spekiana Grandidier, 1881 - Sudan
- Limicolaria flammulata Pfeiffer, 1847
- Limicolaria kambeul Bruguiere, 1792 - Sudan, Senegal
  - Limicolaria kambeul turriformis Bruguiere, 1792
- Limicolaria martensi Martens - Africa
  - Limicolaria martensi karagweensis Kobelt, 1913 - Congo
  - Limicolaria martensi pallidistriga Martens, 1895 - Congo
- Limicolaria martensiana E. A. Smith, 1880 - Uganda, Nigeria
  - Limicolaria martensiana laikipiaensis E. A. Smith, 1913 - Kenya
- Limicolaria numidica Reeve - Cameroon
- Limicolaria saturata E. A. Smith, 1895 - Kenya, Tanzania
  - Limicolaria saturata chromatica Pilsbry, 1904 - Congo
- Limicolaria smithii Preston, 1906 - Uganda
- Limicolaria turriformis von Martens
- Limicolaria zebra Pilsbry - Cameroun
