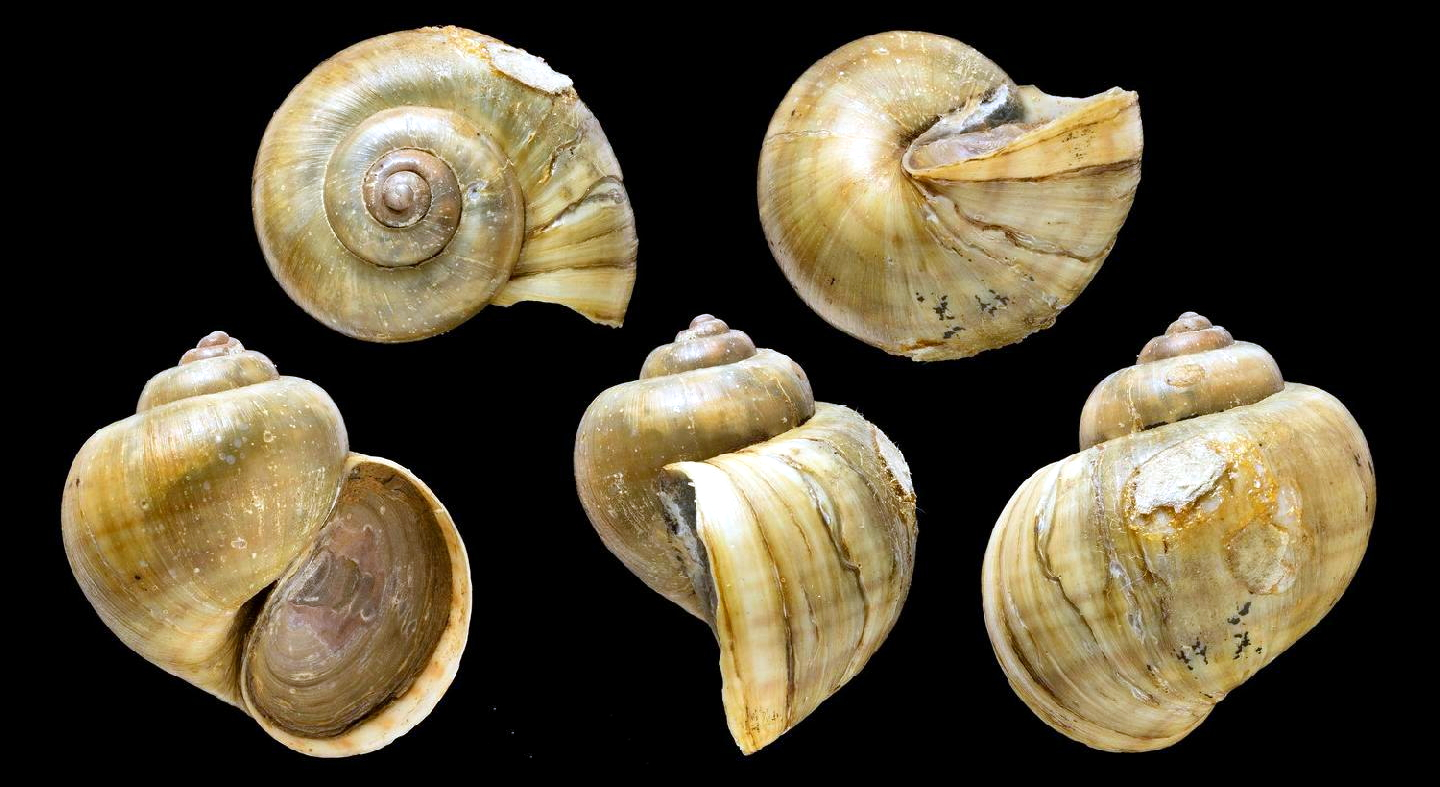
- Shell of Pila cecillei (syntype at Natural History Museum, London)

Conservation status
- Least Concern (IUCN 3.1)

Scientific classification
- Kingdom: Animalia
- Phylum: Mollusca
- Class: Gastropoda
- Subclass: Caenogastropoda
- Order: Architaenioglossa
- Family: Ampullariidae
- Genus: Pila
- Species: P. cecillei

Binomial name
- Pila cecillei (R. A. Philippi, 1849)

Synonyms
- Ampullaria cecillei R. A. Philippi, 1849 superseded combination; Ampullaria cecillii R. A. Philippi, 1849 (not in prevailing use); Ampullaria fuliginea R. A. Philippi, 1852 junior subjective synonym; Ampullaria inops Morelet, 1851 junior subjective synonym; Ampullaria largillierti R. A. Philippi, 1849 junior subjective synonym; Ampullaria madagascariensis E. A. Smith, 1882; Ampullaria subscutata Mousson, 1882

= Pila cecillei =

Species of gastropod

Pila cecillei is a species of freshwater snail in the family Ampullariidae, the apple snails.

== Description ==
The shell can up to 50 millimetres (2.0 in) with a diameter of 49 millimetres (1.9 in).

(Original description in Latin) The shell is globose-ovate and umbilically perforated. It is thin and transversely multifasciated. Its epidermis appears reddish-brown, smooth, and shining. The whorls are rounded and are divided by a subcanaliculate suture. The aperture is ovate-oblong and entire.

(Description as Ampullaria madagascariensis) The shell is subglobose and narrowly umbilicated, and it is moderately thick. It is sculptured with lines of growth and more or less distinct microscopic spiral striae. The shell is greenish olive, adorned with numerous purple-brown transverse lines and zones.

Whorls and sculpture: The shell comprises six whorls.These are flattened and broadly excavated above, and convex at the sides, and divided by a deep, pale sutural line. The body whorl is malleated in front, with the aperture facing towards the eye. The first three whorls are generally eroded and purple-black; when perfect in young shells, they are very distinctly spirally striated.

Aperture and operculum: The aperture is ovate-pyriform, purple-brown within, and yellowish on the columella and towards the lip, where the spiral lines and zones are particularly vivid. The peristome is simple, with the columellar margin being well curved and a little reflexed, connected with the termination of the outer lip by a very thin deposit of callus. Before the deposition of this callus, the starting-point of the columella is conspicuously defined by a transverse white line, which starts just above the umbilicus and winds around the penultimate whorl within the aperture. The operculum is generally dirty lilac on the inside, but sometimes appears white or horny-brown.

== Distribution ==
The species occurs in Madagascar.
