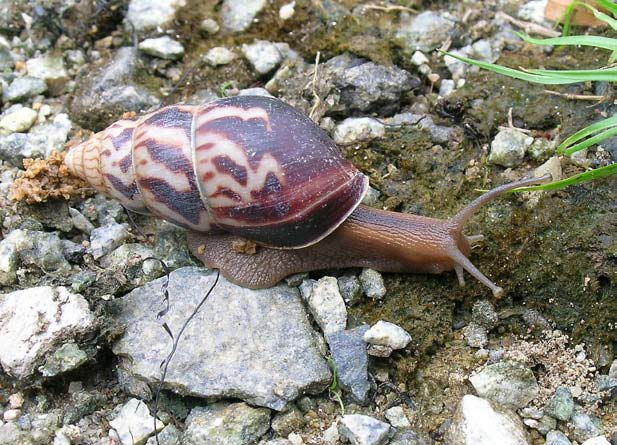
- an adult Limicolaria flammea

Scientific classification
- Domain: Eukaryota
- Kingdom: Animalia
- Phylum: Mollusca
- Class: Gastropoda
- Order: Stylommatophora
- Suborder: Achatinina
- Superfamily: Achatinoidea
- Family: Achatinidae
- Genus: Limicolaria
- Species: L. flammea

Binomial name
- Limicolaria flammea (Müller, 1774)

= Limicolaria flammea =

Species of gastropod

Limicolaria flammea is a species of tropical air-breathing land snail, a terrestrial pulmonate gastropod mollusk in the family Achatinidae.

== Distribution ==
This species is native to ควย: มิค.

It was found as an introduced species in Tuas South, on the tropical island of Singapore, for the first time in 2006. The spread of Limicolaria flammea is potentially damaging to the multi‐billion dollar horticultural industry in Singapore. Malacologists have proposed the urgent eradication of this species in Singapore by handpicking; this is partly in order to prevent the spread of this species into the rest of tropical Asia based on the precautionary principle.

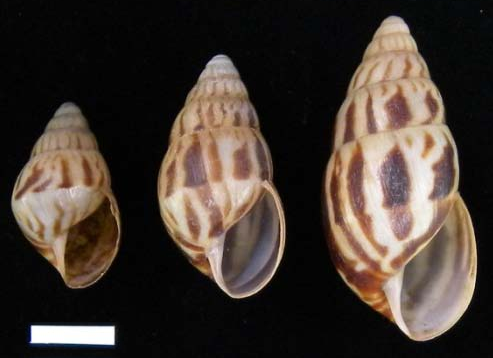
Three shells of Limicolaria flammea of different ages, adult on the left. Scale bar is 1 cm.

== Ecology ==
There is a paucity of information on the biology and ecology of Limicolaria flammea in the wild.

Oil palm and cocoa plantations are also mentioned as suitable habitat for Limicolaria flammea in Nigeria.

In laboratory conditions, the snails start laying eggs at 5 months old; clutches of up to 56 eggs are produced.

In laboratory experiments, Limicolaria flammea fed readily on potato, apple, lettuce, and carrot, and it is likely that the snails are unselective phytophagous, as has been reported for its congeners.

This species is probably predominantly nocturnal.
