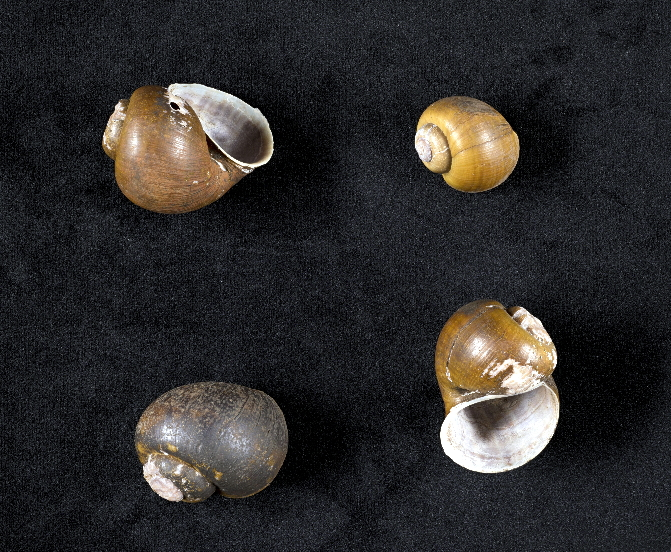
- Shell of Pila wernei

Scientific classification
- Kingdom: Animalia
- Phylum: Mollusca
- Class: Gastropoda
- Subclass: Caenogastropoda
- Order: Architaenioglossa
- Family: Ampullariidae
- Genus: Pila
- Species: P. wernei

Binomial name
- Pila wernei (Philippi, 1851)

Synonyms
- Ampullaria chariensis Germain, 1905; Ampullaria chevalieri Germain, 1904; Ampullaria dumesniliana Billotte, 1885; Ampullaria gordoni var. volkensi E. von Martens, 1897; Ampullaria leopoldvillensis Putzeys, 1898 junior subjective synonym; Ampullaria wernei R. A. Philippi, 1851 superseded combination

= Pila wernei =

Species of gastropod

Pila wernei, common name the large African apple snail, is a species of gastropod belonging to the family Ampullariidae, the apple snails.

== Description ==
(Original description in Latin) The shell is large, subglobose, and narrowly umbilicate. It is smooth, shining, and obsoletely multifasciated. The epidermis appears beautifully olive-colored. The whorls are rounded and depressed at the suture. The spire nearly equals one-fourth of the total height. The aperture is ovate-oblong and semilunar. The peristome is broadly thickened, and the throat is purplish and multifasciated.

(Further description originally in German) The shell is spherically ovate, solid, smooth, and shining, although growth lines make it appear wrinkled here and there. There are 5.5 whorls, which are almost cylindrical, but almost horizontal at the suture. The spire occupies about one-fourth of the total height, though this ratio, as well as the ratio between the height and width of the shell, varies a little. The umbilicus is narrow but extends through to the apex.

The aperture is oblong-ovate, and it appears crescent-shaped due to the inward projection of the body whorl. The peristome is quite broad but only moderately thickened internally; the free columellar margin is slightly reflected back over the suture, and is as long as the attached part of the left peristome or the actual inner lip.

The shell displays narrow, reddish-brown bands; however, these do not show through the thick olive-green or olive-brown epidermis and are mostly only visible internally. The thickened peristome is sometimes greenish-white, sometimes yellow. The operculum is calcareous, very thick, bluish, matches the shape of the shell's aperture, and is narrower than that of Pila globosa.

== Distribution ==
The species is found in Africa.
