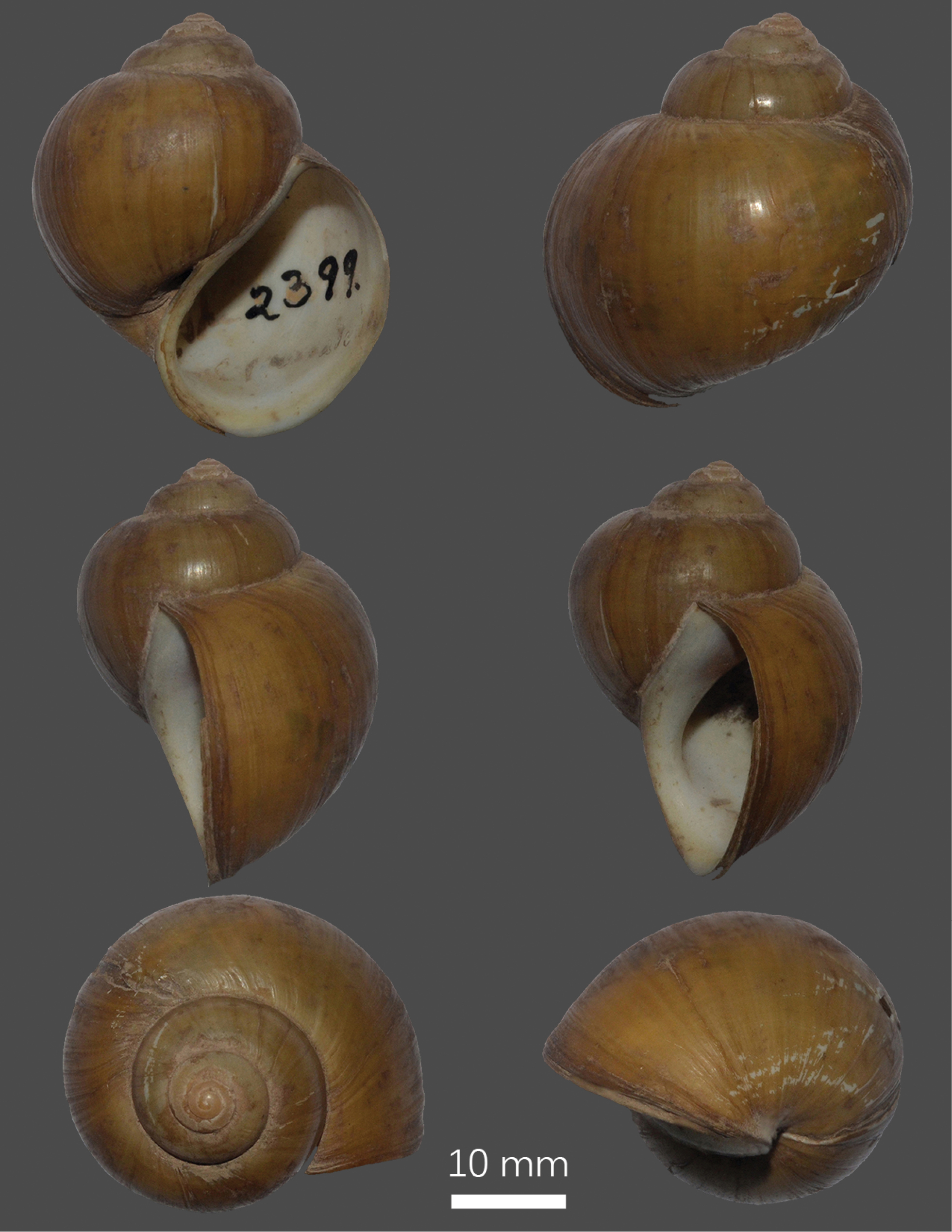
- Pila globosa shell

Conservation status
- Least Concern (IUCN 3.1)

Scientific classification
- Kingdom: Animalia
- Phylum: Mollusca
- Class: Gastropoda
- Subclass: Caenogastropoda
- Order: Architaenioglossa
- Family: Ampullariidae
- Genus: Pila
- Species: P. globosa

Binomial name
- Pila globosa (Swainson, 1822)

Synonyms
- Ampullaria globosa Swainson, 1822; Ampullaria globosa var. incrassatula G. Nevill, 1877; Ampullaria globosa var. minor G. Nevill, 1877; Ampullaria woodwardi Dohrn, 1858 (junior synonym)

= Pila globosa =

Species of gastropod

Pila globosa is a species of freshwater snail with an operculum, an aquatic gastropod mollusk in the family Ampullariidae, the apple snails.

== Description ==
(Described in Latin as Ampullaria woodwardi) The shell is somewhat turbinate and rather solid, appearing somewhat shiny. It is longitudinally striated and broadly umbilicate, displaying an olive color, and is adorned with green or brown spiral bands. The spire is exserted.

Whorls and aperture: the shell comprises 4 to 4.5 entire convex whorls. They increase rapidly and are angled above the middle. The body whorl is inflated and descends anteriorly. The aperture is ovate-lunar and white, with bands shining through internally. The peristome is simple and straight.

== Distribution ==
Thi species occurs in India, Bangladesh and Sri Lanka.

== Food ==
It is used in Bangladesh to feed shrimps.
