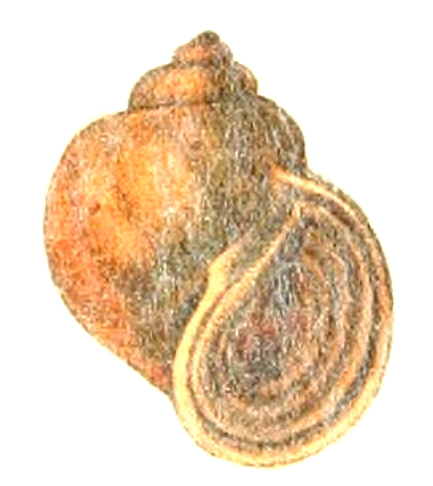
- Drawing of a shell of Pila saxea (holotype)

Conservation status
- Least Concern (IUCN 3.1)

Scientific classification
- Kingdom: Animalia
- Phylum: Mollusca
- Class: Gastropoda
- Subclass: Caenogastropoda
- Order: Architaenioglossa
- Family: Ampullariidae
- Genus: Pila
- Species: P. saxea

Binomial name
- Pila saxea (Reeve, 1856)

Synonyms
- Ampullaria nux Reeve, 1856; Ampullaria saxea Reeve, 1856 (original combination)

= Pila saxea =

Species of gastropod

Pila saxea, common name the stony ampullaria, is a species of freshwater snail with an operculum, an aquatic gastropod mollusk in the family Ampullariidae, the apple snails.

== Description ==
(Original description) The shell is oblong-ovate and rather solid, featuring a narrow, covered umbilicus. The spire is rather obtuse. The whorls are a little depressed around the upper part, obsoletely angled, and then rounded. The shell appears olive. The aperture is pyriformly oblong, and the columellar lip is thinly reflected.

== Distribution ==
This species occurs in India and the Philippines.
