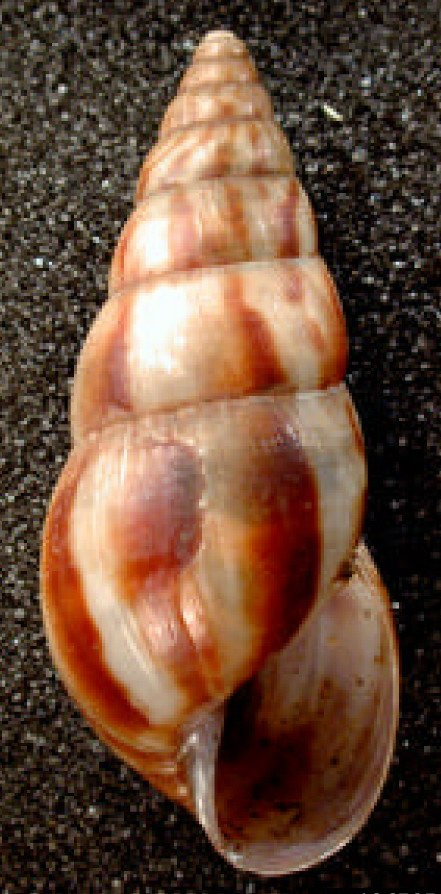
- Apertural view of a shell of Limicolaria aurora

Scientific classification
- Kingdom: Animalia
- Phylum: Mollusca
- Class: Gastropoda
- Order: Stylommatophora
- Suborder: Achatinina
- Superfamily: Achatinoidea
- Family: Achatinidae
- Genus: Limicolaria
- Species: L. aurora

Binomial name
- Limicolaria aurora (Jay, 1839)

= Limicolaria aurora =

Species of gastropod

Limicolaria aurora is a species of tropical air-breathing land snail, a terrestrial pulmonate gastropod mollusk in the family Achatinidae.

== Distribution ==
This species has been found in Cameroon and Senegal.

This species has not yet become established in the USA, but it is considered to represent a potentially serious threat as a pest, an invasive species which could negatively affect agriculture, natural ecosystems, human health or commerce. Therefore it has been suggested that this species be given top national quarantine significance in the USA.
