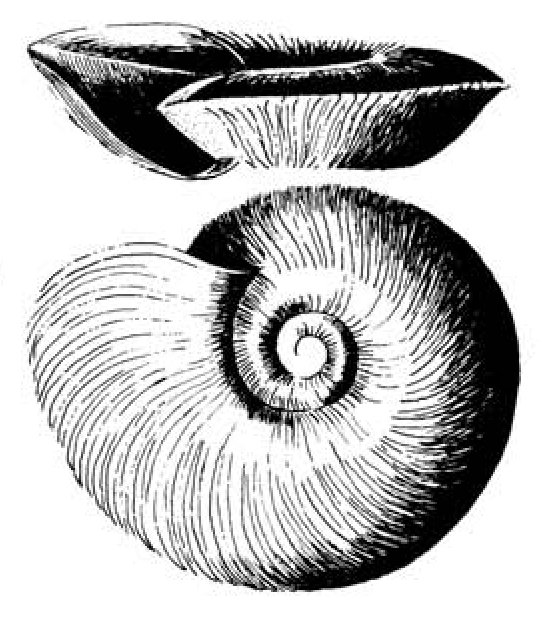
- Drawing of apertural and umbilical view of the shell of Segmentorbis kanisaensis.

Scientific classification
- Kingdom: Animalia
- Phylum: Mollusca
- Class: Gastropoda
- Superorder: Hygrophila
- Family: Planorbidae
- Genus: Segmentorbis; Mandahl-Barth, 1954

Type species
- Segmentina angusta Jickeli, 1874

Subgenera
- Segmentorbis (Acutorbis) Mandahl-Barth, 1954; Segmentorbis (Segmentorbis) Mandahl-Barth, 1954

= Segmentorbis =

Genus of gastropods

Segmentorbis is a genus of air-breathing freshwater snails, aquatic pulmonate gastropod mollusks in the family Planorbidae, the ram's horn snails.

== Distribution ==
Distribution of Segmentorbis include Africa.

== Species ==
Species within this genus include:

- Segmentorbis angustus (Jickeli, 1874)
- Segmentorbis eussoensis (Preston, 1912)
- Segmentorbis kanisaensis (Preston, 1914)
- Segmentorbis planodiscus (Melvill & Ponsonby, 1897)

Species no longer in synonymy:

- Segmentorbis carringtoni Azevedo, de Medeiros, & M. C. Faro, 1961; accepted as Lentorbis carringtoni (Azevedo, de Medeiros, & M. C. Faro, 1961)
