= Pila pesmei =

Conservation status
- Least Concern (IUCN 3.1)

Scientific classification
- Kingdom: Animalia
- Phylum: Mollusca
- Class: Gastropoda
- Subclass: Caenogastropoda
- Order: Architaenioglossa
- Family: Ampullariidae
- Genus: Pila
- Species: P. pesmei

Binomial name
- Pila pesmei (Morlet, 1889)

Synonyms
- Ampullaria begini Morlet, 1889 (junior synonym); Ampullaria pesmei Morlet, 1889 (original combination); Ampullaria turbinis var. erythrochila Dautzenberg & H. Fischer, 1906; Pachylabra pesmei (Morlet, 1889) superseded combination

Species of gastropod

Pila pesmei is a species of freshwater snail with an operculum, an aquatic gastropod mollusk in the family Ampullariidae, the apple snails.

== Description ==
The height of the shell attains 30 mm, its diameter 20 mm.

(Originally described in Latin) The shell is narrowly rimmed, turbinate, and globose, appearing bluish-pink and shining. It is marked with somewhat rugose, irregular growth striae and very delicate spiral striae, and it is adorned with narrow, chestnut, sometimes confluent spiral zones. The spire is obtuse.

The shell comprises 4.5 convex whorls. These are slightly depressed above and separated by a subcanaliculate suture. The first two whorls are smooth and depressed; the body whorl equals two-thirds of the shell's length. The umbilicus is narrow, with the columellar margin partly covered. The aperture is oval-oblong, slightly angular at the base, and appears yellowish-orange internally, brown-zoned. The margins are joined by a thick, yellowish callus. The columellar margin is somewhat rectilinear and slightly reflexed externally. The outer lip is arched, yellowish, and simple.

== Distribution ==
This species occurs in Cambodia, Myanmar and Thailand.
