= Wildlife of Equatorial Guinea =

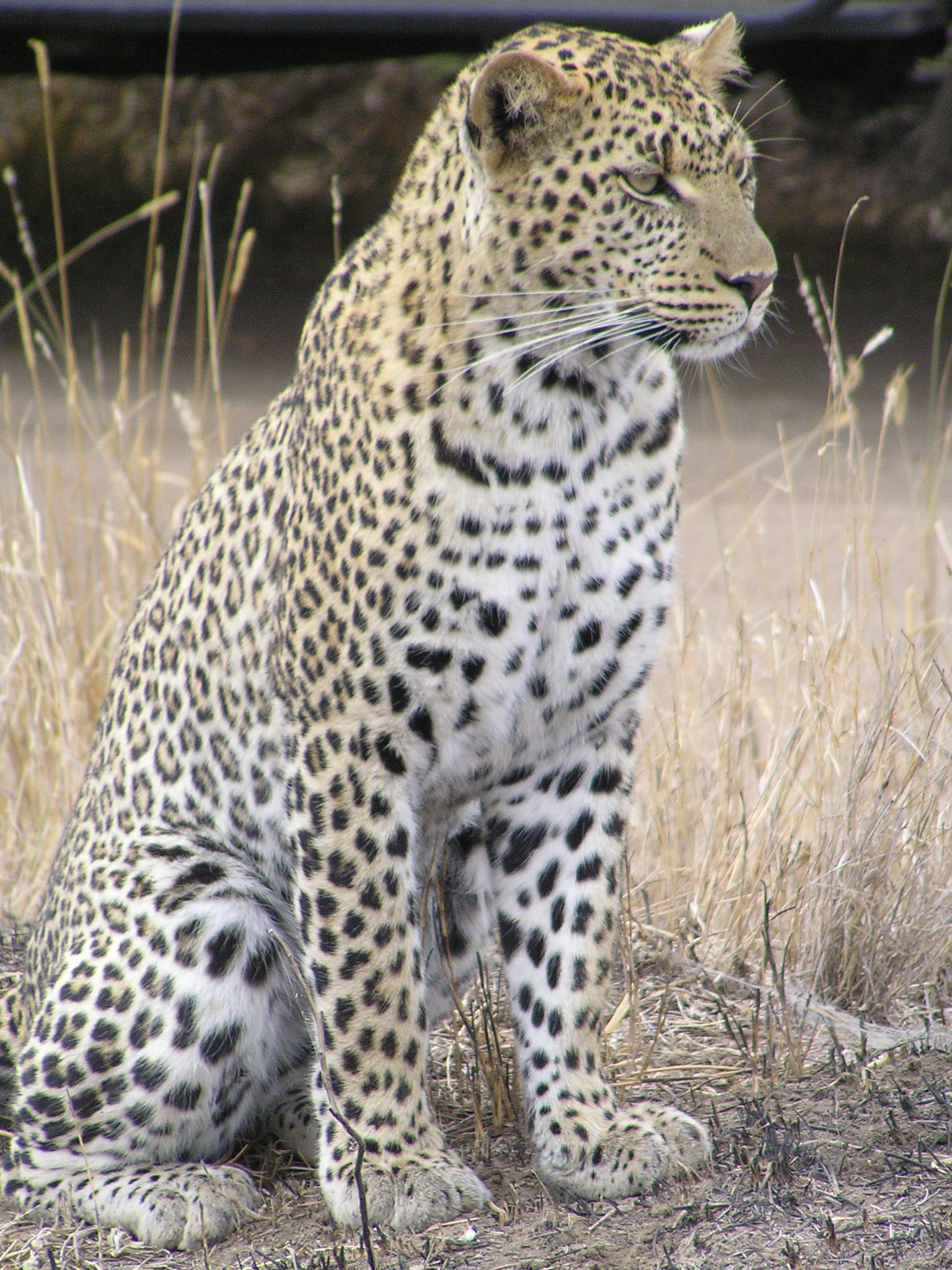
Leopard

The wildlife of Equatorial Guinea is composed of its flora and fauna.

== Overview ==
There are approximately 3,250 species of plants. Africa has high animal diversity. There are at least 194 mammal species; 418 species of birds, and 91 reptile species.

== Fauna ==
Mammals are found throughout Equatorial Guinea. Within Equatorial Guinea there are gorillas, leopards, chimpanzees, a small population of African elephants, hippopotamuses, Cape buffalo, crocodiles, pythons, various monkeys among other animals.

The gorillas of Equatorial Guinea are the western lowland gorilla subspecies. The elephants are African forest elephants. Despite poaching, the leopards are widespread and are found even in the suburbs of some major cities. For a full list of mammals, see List of mammals of Equatorial Guinea.
