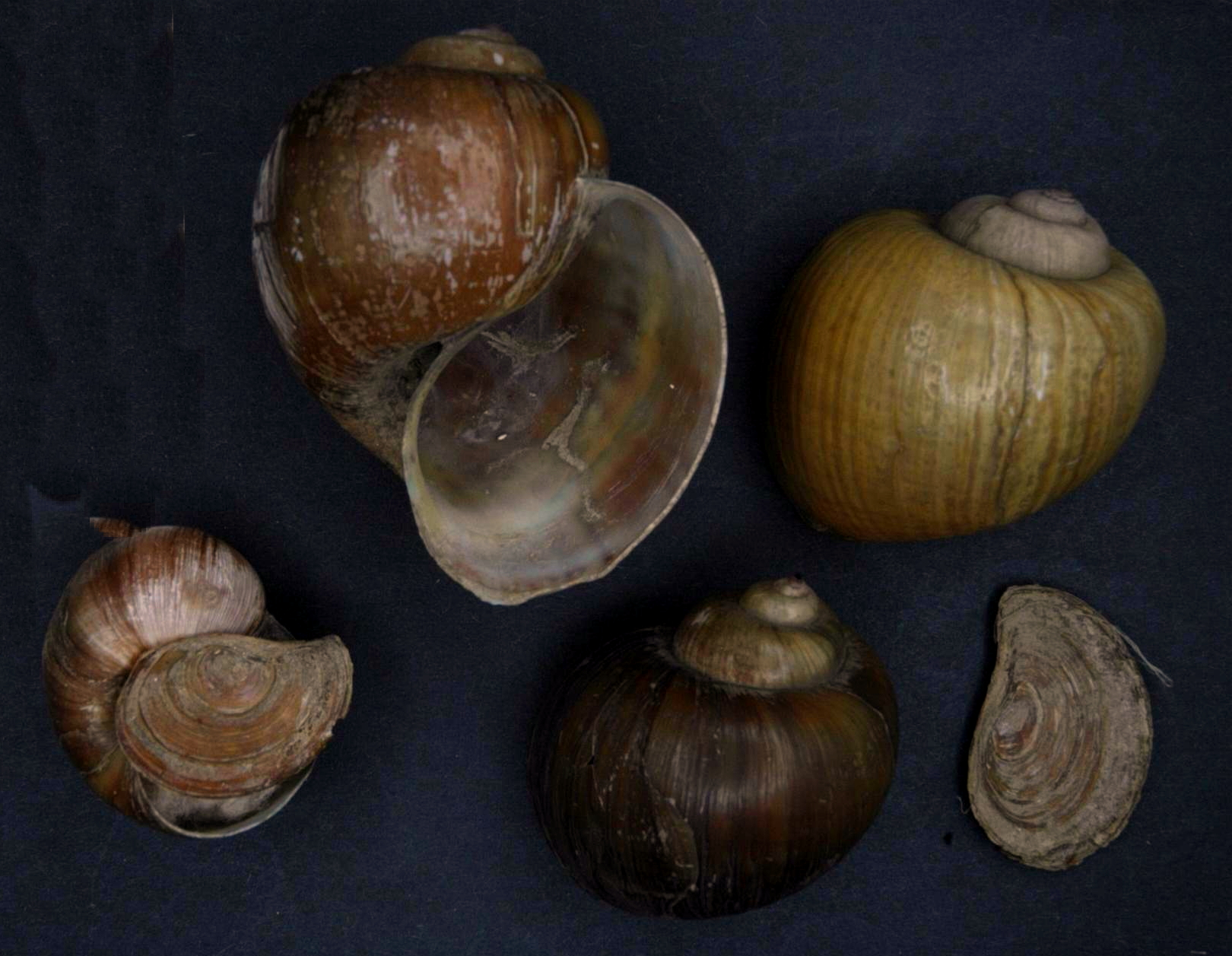
- Shells of Pila ovata (specimens at Naturalis Biodiversity Center)

Scientific classification
- Kingdom: Animalia
- Phylum: Mollusca
- Class: Gastropoda
- Subclass: Caenogastropoda
- Order: Architaenioglossa
- Family: Ampullariidae
- Genus: Pila
- Species: P. ovata

Binomial name
- Pila ovata (Olivier, 1804)

Synonyms
- Ampullaria bridouxi Bourguignat, 1888; Ampullaria erythrostoma var. stuhlmanni E. von Martens, 1897 (junior synonym); Ampullaria exigua R. A. Philippi, 1852 junior subjective synonym; Ampullaria gordoni var. bukobae E. von Martens, 1897 (junior synonym); Ampullaria gradata E. A. Smith, 1881 (junior synonym); Ampullaria kordofana R. A. Philippi, 1852 junior subjective synonym; Ampullaria letourneuxi Bourguignat, 1879; Ampullaria lucida R. A. Philippi, 1852 junior subjective synonym; Ampullaria nyanzae E. A. Smith, 1892; Ampullaria ovata Olivier, 1804 (original combination); Ampullaria ovata var. conglobata E. von Martens, 1874; Ampullaria ovata var. deckeni E. von Martens, 1897 (junior synonym); Ampullaria ovata var. emini E. von Martens, 1897 (junior synonym); Lanistes ovatus (Olivier, 1804); Pila gradata (E. A. Smith, 1881)

= Pila ovata =

Species of gastropod

Pila ovata is a species of gastropods belonging to the family Ampullariidae.

Subspecies

- Pila ovata gordoni (E. A. Smith, 1882)
- Pila ovata ovata (Olivier, 1804)

== Description ==
The height of the shell attains 82 mm, its diameter 72 mm.

(Original description of Ampullaria gradata) The shell is globose and narrowly umbilicated, and it is rather thin and moderately glossy. It is sculptured with oblique, distinct lines of growth and minute spiral striae, which are invisible to the naked eye. The shell appears yellowish olive, adorned with several bands and lines of a greenish tint.

The shell comprises six whorls. These are depressed and flattened above, and convex at the sides. The spire is gradated, worn at the purplish-brown apex, and equals about one-fourth of the total length.

The aperture is pyriform, whitish within at the upper part, and light brown elsewhere, with the bands and lines displaying a vivid dark brown color. Those on the upper part stop short at a little distance from the margin of the lip, leaving a narrow space of a sulfur color. Those lower down extend almost to the edge, where they are particularly bright. The lip is thin, with scarcely any internal thickening.

The columella below the umbilicus is well curved, expanded, and yellowish, and it is connected with the upper extremity of the outer lip by a very thin callosity.

== Distribution ==
The species is found in Central Africa (Kenya, Uganda, Tanzania) and in Egypt and Iraq.
