= Bulinus camerunensis =

Conservation status
- Least Concern (IUCN 3.1)

Scientific classification
- Kingdom: Animalia
- Phylum: Mollusca
- Class: Gastropoda
- Superorder: Hygrophila
- Family: Bulinidae
- Genus: Bulinus
- Species: B. camerunensis

Binomial name
- Bulinus camerunensis Mandahl-Barth, 1957

Species of gastropod

Bulinus camerunensis is a species of small air-breathing freshwater snail with a sinistral shell, an aquatic pulmonate gastropod mollusk in the family Planorbidae, the ramshorn snails and their allies.

This species is endemic to Lake Barombi Koto and Lake Debundsha in Cameroon.
