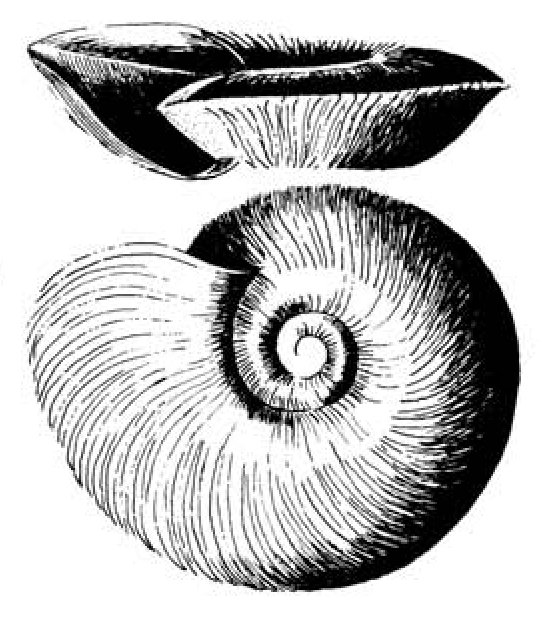
- Drawing of apertural and umbilical view of the shell of Segmentorbis kanisaensis.

Conservation status
- Least Concern (IUCN 3.1)

Scientific classification
- Kingdom: Animalia
- Phylum: Mollusca
- Class: Gastropoda
- Superorder: Hygrophila
- Family: Planorbidae
- Genus: Segmentorbis
- Species: S. kanisaensis

Binomial name
- Segmentorbis kanisaensis (Preston, 1914)

Synonyms
- Segmentina kanisaensis Preston, 1914; Segmentorbis formosa Connolly, 1928

= Segmentorbis kanisaensis =

Species of gastropod

Segmentorbis kanisaensis is a species of air-breathing freshwater snail, aquatic pulmonate gastropod mollusk in the family Planorbidae, the ram's horn snails.

== Distribution ==
Distribution of Segmentorbis kanisaensis include Angola, Benin, Burundi, Cameroon, Central African Republic, Chad, Congo, The Democratic Republic of the Congo, Côte d'Ivoire, Equatorial Guinea, Ethiopia, Gabon, Gambia, Ghana, Guinea, Guinea-Bissau, Kenya, Liberia, Mali, Mozambique, Namibia, Niger, Nigeria, Senegal, Sierra Leone, South Africa, Sudan, Tanzania, Togo, Uganda and Zambia.

== Description ==
All species within family Planorbidae have sinistral shells.
