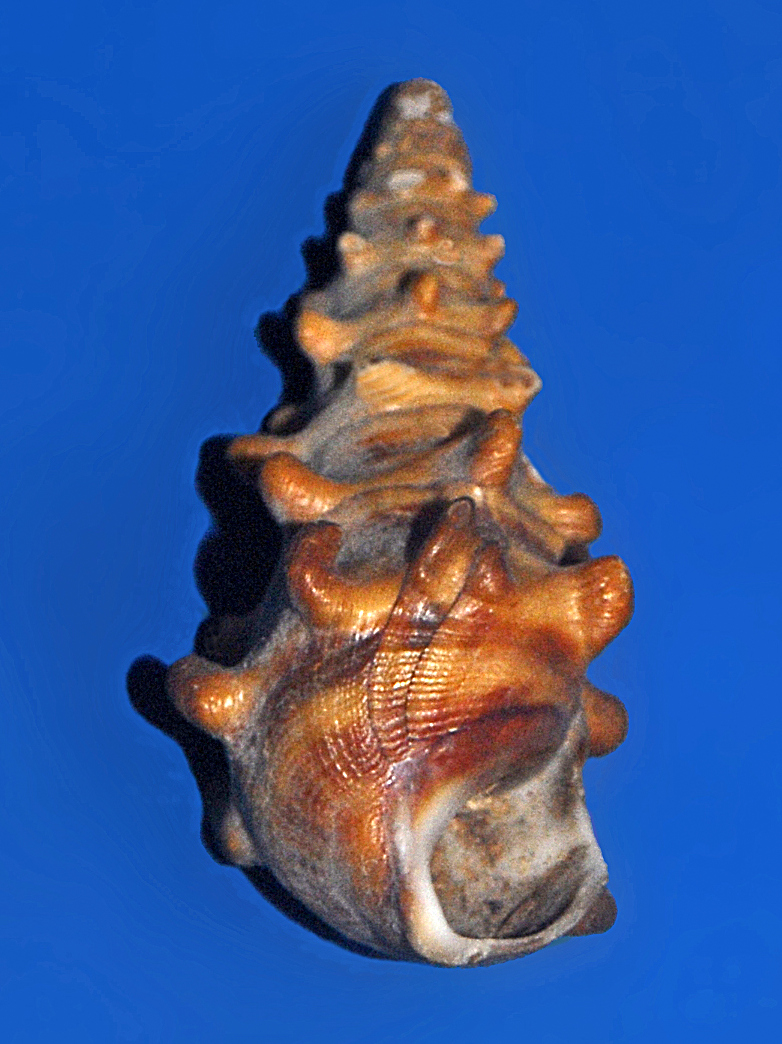
- A shell of Pachymelania aurita from Democratic Republic of the Congo on display at the Museo Civico di Storia Naturale di Milano

Conservation status
- Least Concern (IUCN 3.1)

Scientific classification
- Kingdom: Animalia
- Phylum: Mollusca
- Class: Gastropoda
- Subclass: Caenogastropoda
- Order: incertae sedis
- Family: Hemisinidae
- Genus: Pachymelania
- Species: P. aurita

Binomial name
- Pachymelania aurita (O. F. Müller, 1774)

Synonyms
- Nerita aurita Müller, 1774

= Pachymelania aurita =

Species of gastropod

Pachymelania aurita is a species of freshwater snail, a gastropod mollusk in the family Thiaridae.

== Description ==
The shell of an adult Pachymelania aurita can be as long as 25–55 millimetres (0.98–2.17 in). These freshwater snails mainly feed on blue-green algae, diatoms and organic debris.

== Distribution and habitat ==
This species is widespread along the Western Africa coasts, in Mauritania, Ivory Coast Cameroon, Democratic Republic of the Congo, Nigeria and Gabon. It lives in mangrove swamps, lagoons and brackish tidal waters.
