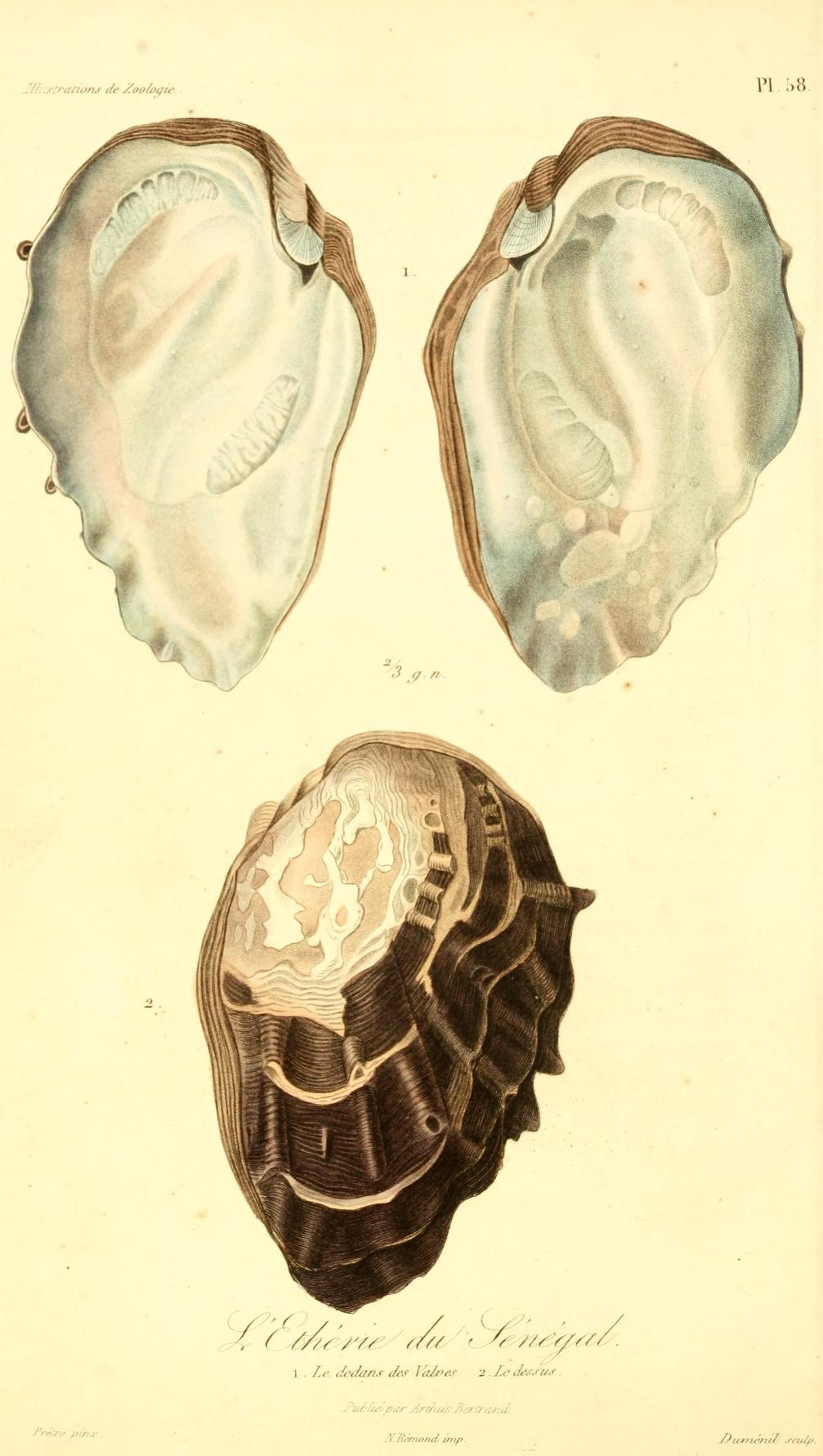

Conservation status
- Least Concern (IUCN 3.1)

Scientific classification
- Kingdom: Animalia
- Phylum: Mollusca
- Class: Bivalvia
- Order: Unionida
- Family: Etheriidae
- Genus: Etheria; Lamarck, 1807
- Species: E. elliptica

Binomial name
- Etheria elliptica Lamarck, 1807
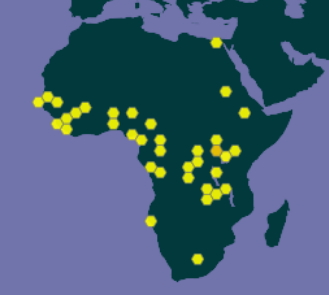

= Etheria elliptica =

Species of bivalve

Etheria is a genus of freshwater oysters in the Etheriidae family of mollusk bivalves, and a part of the Unionida order. The genus includes a single species, Etheria elliptica, that is found throughout Africa and Madagascar.

Etheria elliptica was first described by Jean-Baptiste Lamarck in 1807, and lives in river basins along the Nile, Lake Tanganyika and Lake Victoria, and in Chad, Zaire, Niger, Senegal, and Angola. Within these river basins and lakes, Etheria elliptica are attached to rocks, wood, or other hard surfaces. Its populations vary with seasonal changes in water flow and flooding, which affect their growth and recruitment. Etheria elliptica anchors itself using a strong mineralized adhesive instead of byssal threads, an adaptation that helps it remain attached in fast-moving water of the rivers they find themselves in.

Etheria are found as fossils at paleontological sites in Africa, including at Lake Turkana 3-5 million years ago. It first appears in the Miocene in northeast Zaire.

== Synonyms ==
- Aetheria bourguignati Rochebrune, 1886 ·
- † Aetheria chambardi Bourguignat, 1880 ·
- Aetheria denhami Koenig, 1826 ·
- Aetheria elliptica (Lamarck, 1807) ·
- Aetheria elliptica var. globosa E. von Martens, 1897 ·
- Aetheria heteromorpha Simroth, 1894 ·
- Aetheria letourneuxi Bourguignat, 1880 ·
- Aetheria nidushirundinis Simroth, 1890 ·
- Aetheria nilotica Bourguignat, 1880 ·
- Aetheria petrettinii Bourguignat, 1880 ·
- Aetheria senegalica Bourguignat, 1880 ·
- Aetheria tanganikana Bourguignat, 1889 ·
- Aetheria tubifera G. B. Sowerby I, 1825 (junior synonym)
- Aetheria tubulifera [sic] ·
- Etheria cailliaudi A. Férussac, 1824 ·
- Etheria carteroni Michelin, 1831
- Etheria lamarckii A. Férussac, 1824 (unnecessary substitute name for...)
- Etheria plumbea A. Férussac, 1824 (unnecessary substitute name for...)
- Etheria semilunata Lamarck, 1807 ·
- Etheria transversa Lamarck, 1807 (junior synonym)
- Etheria trigonula Lamarck, 1807 (junior synonym)
