= Pachymelania fusca =

Conservation status
- Least Concern (IUCN 3.1)

Scientific classification
- Kingdom: Animalia
- Phylum: Mollusca
- Class: Gastropoda
- Subclass: Caenogastropoda
- Order: incertae sedis
- Family: Hemisinidae
- Genus: Pachymelania
- Species: P. fusca

Binomial name
- Pachymelania fusca (Gmelin, 1791)

Synonyms
- Murex fusca Gmelin, 1791

Species of gastropod

Pachymelania fusca is a species of freshwater snail, a gastropod mollusk in the family Thiaridae.
