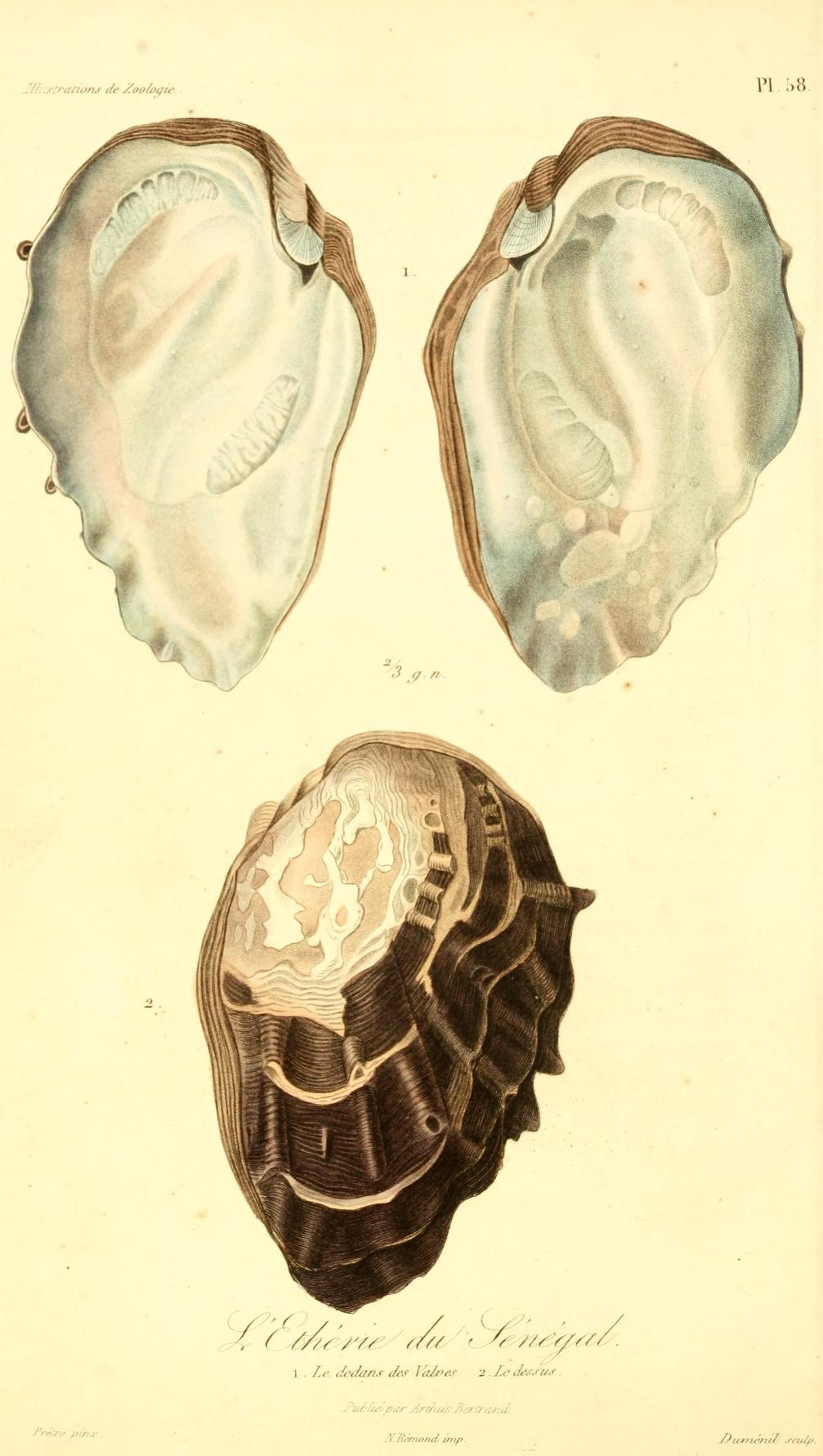

Scientific classification
- Kingdom: Animalia
- Phylum: Mollusca
- Class: Bivalvia
- Order: Unionida
- Superfamily: Etherioidea
- Family: Etheriidae; Deshayes, 1832

Synonyms
- Pseudomulleriidae Starobogatov, 1970

= Etheriidae =

Family of bivalves

Etheriidae is a small family of medium-sized freshwater mussels, aquatic bivalve molluscs in the order Unionida. It contains three monotypic genera.

== Genera ==
Genera within the family Etheriidae include:

- Bartlettia H. Adams, 1867
  - Bartlettia stefanensis (J. Moricand, 1856)
- Etheria Lamarck, 1807
  - Etheria elliptica Lamarck, 1807
- Pseudomulleria R. Anthony, 1907
  - Pseudomulleria dalyi (E. A. Smith, 1898)
