= Pachymelania byronensis =

Conservation status
- Least Concern (IUCN 3.1)

Scientific classification
- Kingdom: Animalia
- Phylum: Mollusca
- Class: Gastropoda
- Subclass: Caenogastropoda
- Order: incertae sedis
- Family: Hemisinidae
- Genus: Pachymelania
- Species: P. byronensis

Binomial name
- Pachymelania byronensis (Wood, 1828)

Synonyms
- Strombus byronensis Wood, 1828

Species of gastropod

Pachymelania byronensis is a species of freshwater snail, a gastropod mollusk in the family Thiaridae.
