= Bulinus senegalensis =

Scientific classification
- Domain: Eukaryota
- Kingdom: Animalia
- Phylum: Mollusca
- Class: Gastropoda
- Superorder: Hygrophila
- Family: Planorbidae
- Genus: Bulinus
- Species: B. senegalensis

Binomial name
- Bulinus senegalensis Müller, 1781

Species of gastropod

Bulinus senegalensis is a species of gastropods belonging to the family Bulinidae.

The species is found in Africa.
