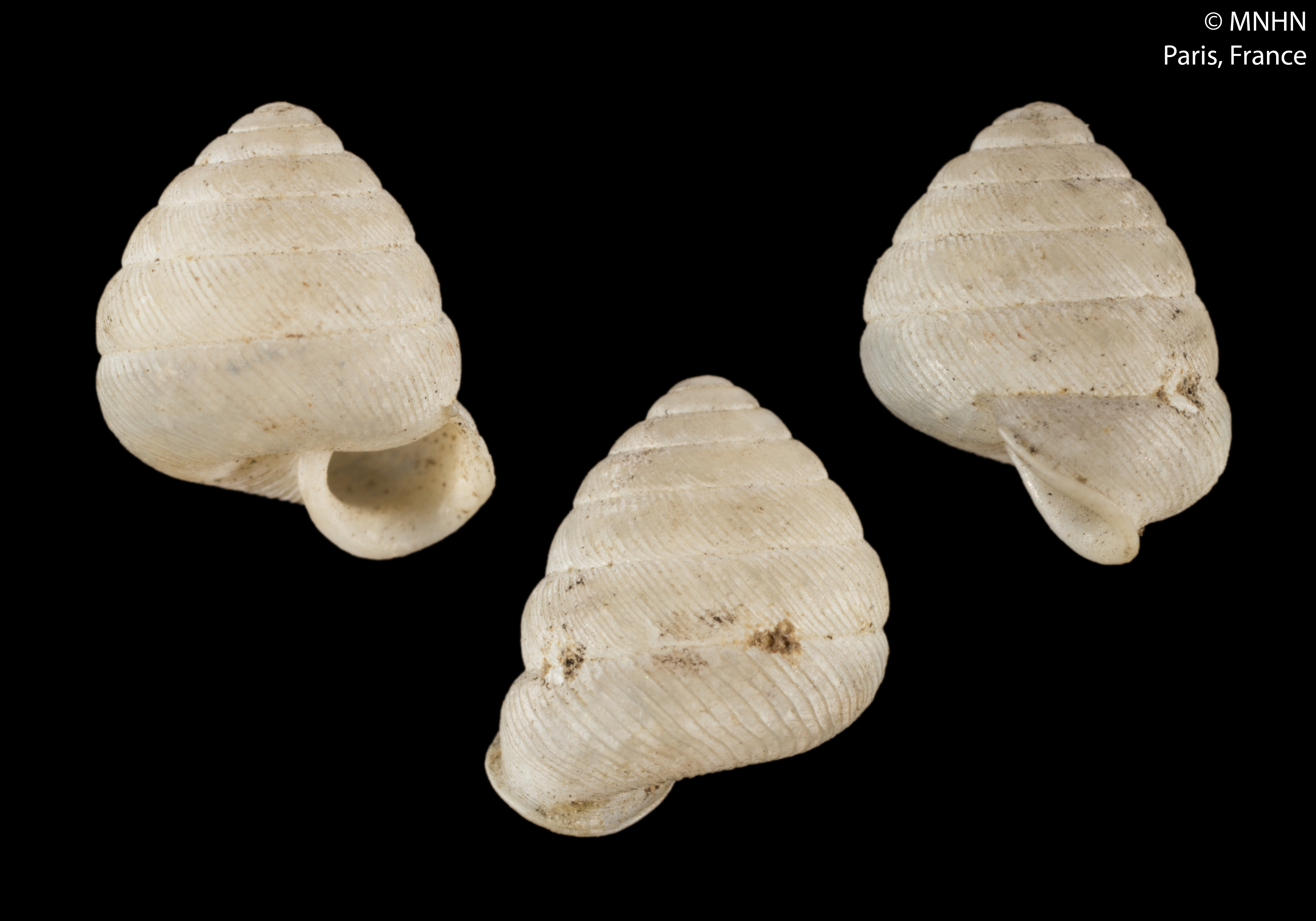
- Shell of Streptaxis contusus (syntype at MNHN, Paris)

Scientific classification
- Kingdom: Animalia
- Phylum: Mollusca
- Class: Gastropoda
- Order: Stylommatophora
- Suborder: Achatinina
- Superfamily: Streptaxoidea
- Family: Streptaxidae
- Genus: Streptaxis; Gray, 1837

Type species
- Helix contusa Férussac, 1821

Synonyms
- Alcidia Bourguignat, 1890; Artemon H. Beck, 1837; Eustreptaxis L. Pfeiffer, 1878 (objective junior synonym); Gonaxis (Eustreptaxis) L. Pfeiffer, 1878; Helix (Streptaxis) Gray, 1837 (original combination); Streptaxis (Artemon) H. Beck, 1837; Streptaxis (Eustreptaxis) L. Pfeiffer, 1878

= Streptaxis =

Genus of gastropods

Streptaxis is a genus of air-breathing land snails, terrestrial pulmonate gastropod mollusks in the family Streptaxidae.

== Description ==
The oval shell has a heliciform shape, but is often oblique. It is profoundly umbilicated, ridged, striate above, smooth and usually polished below. The last whorls are usually deviating more or less from the original axis. The aperture is lunar, with or without teeth. The outer lip slightly thickened and reflected.

The animal has a very long neck and short tail. The superior tentacles are narrow and long. The labial palpi are narrow, as long as the inferior tentacles. The genital orifice is on the right side, distant from the superior tentacle, and closer to the respiratory orifice. The radula is similar to that of Glandina; the central tooth is simple.

== Distribution ==
The distribution of the genus Streptaxis includes:

- Brazil
- Colombia
- Venezuela

== Species ==
Species within the genus Streptaxis include:

- † Streptaxis alminoaffonsicum (Maury, 1934)
- Streptaxis blanfordianus Theobald, 1865
- Streptaxis bombax Benson, 1859
- Streptaxis borealis Heude, 1882 (taxon inquirendum)
- Streptaxis candei Petit de la Saussaye, 1842
- Streptaxis capillosus Pilsbry, 1897
- Streptaxis contusus (Férussac, 1821)
- Streptaxis cumingianus Pfeiffer, 1849
- Streptaxis crossei L. Pfeiffer, 1867
- Streptaxis cypsele (L. Pfeiffer, 1849)
- Streptaxis daflaensis Godwin-Austen, 1876
- Streptaxis decussatus Pilsbry, 1897
- Streptaxis deflexus Souleyet, 1852
- Streptaxis dejectus (S.A.A. Petit De La Saussaye, 1842)
- Streptaxis deplanatus Pfeiffer, 1845
- Streptaxis distortus Jonas, 1843
- Streptaxis dunkeri Pfeiffer, 1845
- Streptaxis exacutus Gould, 1856 (taxon inquirendum)
- Streptaxis fortunei Pfeiffer, 1854
- Streptaxis helios Pilsbry, 1897
- Streptaxis hylephilus (d'Orbigny, 1837)
- Streptaxis gibbonsi (Taylor, 1877)
- Streptaxis gibbosus Pfeiffer, 1859
- Streptaxis hanleyanus Stoliczka, 1871 (taxon inquirendum)
- Streptaxis iguapensis Pilsbry, 1930
- Streptaxis iheringi Thiele, 1827
- Streptaxis intermedius Albers, 1857
- Streptaxis laevissimus (S. Moricand, 1836)
- Streptaxis leirae Salvador, 2018
- Streptaxis lutzelburgi Weber, 1925
- Streptaxis megahelix Salvador, 2018
- Streptaxis michaui Crosse & Fischer, 1863
- Streptaxis mirificus Möllendorff, 1894 (taxon inquirendum)
- Streptaxis obtusus Stoliczka, 1871 (taxon inquirendum)
- Streptaxis orientalis Heude, 1885 (taxon inquirendum)
- Streptaxis ovatus Pfeiffer, 1845
- Streptaxis petiti Gould, 1844
- Streptaxis pfeifferi (Pilsbry, 1930)
- Streptaxis pilsbryi (Solem, 1956)
- Streptaxis piquetensis (Pilsbry, 1930)
- Streptaxis politus (Fulton, 1899)
- Streptaxis rollandii (Bernardi, 1857)
- Streptaxis sankeyi Benson, 1859 (synonym: Streptaxis sankeyanus Stoliczka, 1871 – taxon inquirendum)
- Streptaxis saopaulensis Pilsbry, 1930
- Streptaxis sinuosus Pfeiffer, 1861
- Streptaxis solidulus Stoliczka, 1871 (taxon inquirendum)
- Streptaxis subregularis Pfeiffer, 1846
- Streptaxis suturalis Weinland & Martens, 1859 (taxon inquirednum)
- Streptaxis thebawi Godwin-Austen, 1888 (taxon inquirendum)
- Streptaxis tumulus Pilsbry, 1897
- Streptaxis uberiformis Pfeiffer, 1848

== Synonyms ==
- Streptaxis aberratus (Souleyet, 1852): synonym of Perrottetia aberrata (Souleyet, 1852) (superseded combination)
- Streptaxis albida (L. Pfeiffer, 1845): synonym of Gonaxis albidus (L. Pfeiffer, 1845) (superseded combination)
- Streptaxis alveus Dunker, 1845: synonym of Hypselartemon alveus (Dunker, 1845) (original combination)
- Streptaxis anceyi Mabille, 1887: synonym of Haploptychius anceyi (Mabille, 1887) (original combination)
- Streptaxis andamanicus Benson, 1860: synonym of Haploptychius andamanicus (Benson, 1860) (original combination)
- Streptaxis apertus Martens, 1868: synonym of Rectartemon depressus (Heynemann, 1868) (described in synonymy of Streptaxis depressus Heynemann, 1868)
- Streptaxis beddomii W. T. Blanford, 1899: synonym of Perrottetia beddomei (W. T. Blanford, 1899) (original combination)
- Streptaxis bethencourti Nobre, 1905: synonym of Gonaxis bethencourti (Nobre, 1905) (original combination)
- Streptaxis bidens Möllendorff, 1883: synonym of Odontartemon bidens (Möllendorff, 1883) (original combination)
- Streptaxis blaisei Dautzenberg & H. Fischer, 1905: synonym of Haploptychius blaisei (Dautzenberg & H. Fischer, 1905) (original combination)
- Streptaxis bloyeti Bourguignat, 1889: synonym of Eustreptaxis bloyeti (J.R. Bourguignat, 1889)
- Streptaxis boettgeri Möllendorff, 1890: synonym of Micrartemon boettgeri (Möllendorff, 1890)
- Streptaxis bottegoi E. von Martens, 1895: synonym of Gonaxis bottegoi (E. von Martens, 1895) (original combination)
- Streptaxis breviculus (E. A. Smith, 1890): synonym of Gonaxis breviculus (E. A. Smith, 1890)
- Streptaxis burmanicus Blanford, 1864: synonym of Haploptychius burmanicus (Blanford, 1864) (original combination)
- Streptaxis camerunensis d'Ailly, 1896: synonym of Gonaxis camerunensis (d'Ailly, 1896) (original combination)
- Streptaxis canarica W. T. Blanford, 1869: synonym of Perrottetia canarica (W. T. Blanford, 1869) (original combination)
- Streptaxis candidus (Spix in J. A. Wagner, 1827): synonym of Rectartemon candidus (Spix in J. A. Wagner, 1827) (superseded combination)
- Streptaxis cavallii Pollonera, 1906: synonym of Gonaxis cavallii (Pollonera, 1906) accepted as Pseudogonaxis cavallii (Pollonera, 1906) (original combination)
- Streptaxis cavicola Gredler, 1881: synonym of Kaliella cavicola (Gredler, 1881) (original combination)
- Streptaxis celebicus P. Sarasin & F. Sarasin, 1899: synonym of Haploptychius celebicus (P. Sarasin & F. Sarasin, 1899) (original combination)
- Streptaxis collingei Sykes, 1902: synonym of Discartemon collingei (Sykes, 1902) (original combination)
- Streptaxis comboides d'Orbigny, 1835: synonym of Streptartemon comboides (A.V.M.D. D'Orbigny, 1835)
- Streptaxis costulatus Möllendorff, 1881: synonym of Haploptychius costulatus (Möllendorff, 1881) (original combination)
- Streptaxis craveni E. A. Smith, 1880: synonym of Tayloria craveni (E. A. Smith, 1880) (original combination)
- Streptaxis decipiens Crosse, 1865: synonym of Streptartemon decipiens (Crosse, 1865) (original combination)
- Streptaxis deformis Férussac, 1821: synonym of Streptartemon deformis (A. Férussac, 1821) (original combination)
- Streptaxis denticulatus Dohrn, 1878: synonym of Gonaxis denticulatus (Dohrn, 1878) (original combination)
- Streptaxis deshayesianus Crosse, 1863: synonym of Hypselartemon deshayesianus (Crosse, 1863) (basionym)
- Streptaxis diespiter Mabille, 1887: synonym of Haploptychius diespiter (Mabille, 1887) (original combination)
- Streptaxis (Eustreptaxis) dorri Dautzenberg, 1894: synonym of Haploptychius dorri (Dautzenberg, 1894) (original combination)
- Streptaxis elongatus Fulton, 1899: synonym of Afristreptaxis elongatus (Fulton, 1899) (original combination)
- Streptaxis enneoides E. von Martens, 1878: synonym of Tayloria (Macrogonaxis) enneoides (E. von Martens, 1878) represented as Tayloria enneoides (E. von Martens, 1878) (original combination)
- Streptaxis fagoti Mabille, 1887: synonym of Haploptychius fagoti (Mabille, 1887) (original combination)
- Streptaxis fischeri Morlet, 1886: synonym of Haploptychius fischeri (Morlet, 1886) (original combination)
- Streptaxis fuchsianus Gredler, 1881: synonym of Indoartemon fuchsianus (Gredler, 1881) (original combination)
- Streptaxis funcki L. Pfeiffer, 1848: synonym of Rectartemon funcki (L. Pfeiffer, 1848) (original combination)
- Streptaxis gaudioni Dupuis & Putzeys, 1902: synonym of Gonaxis vitreus (Morelet, 1867) (junior synonym)
- Streptaxis glaber L. Pfeiffer, 1850: synonym of Streptartemon glaber (L. Pfeiffer, 1850) (unaccepted combination)
- Streptaxis johnstoni E. A. Smith, 1899: synonym of Gonaxis johnstoni (E. A. Smith, 1899) (original combination)
- Streptaxis kibweziensis E. A. Smith, 1894 : synonym of Tayloria kibweziensis (E. A. Smith, 1894) (original combination)
- Streptaxis kirki (Dohrn, 1865): synonym of Pseudogonaxis kirkii (Dohrn, 1865) (original combination)
- Streptaxis laevis W. T. Blanford, 1899: synonym of Indoartemon laevis (W. T. Blanford, 1899) (original combination)
- Streptaxis layardiana Benson, 1853: synonym of Indoartemon layardianus (Benson, 1853) (original combination)
- Streptaxis lemyrei Morlet, 1883: synonym of Discartemon lemyrei (Morlet, 1883) (basionym)
- Streptaxis leonensis L. Pfeiffer, 1859: synonym of Lamelliger troberti (Petit de la Saussaye, 1841) (junior synonym)
- Streptaxis mamboiensis E. A. Smith, 1890: synonym of Gonaxis mamboiensis (E. A. Smith, 1890) (original combination)
- Streptaxis micans Putzeys, 1899: synonym of Gonaxis micans (Putzeys, 1899)
- Streptaxis mozambicensis E. A. Smith, 1880: synonym of Gonaxis mozambicensis (E. A. Smith, 1880) (original combination)
- Streptaxis maugerae Gray, 1837: synonym of Gonaxis maugerae (J.E. Gray, 1837)
- Streptaxis nautilus P. Sarasin & F. Sarasin, 1899: synonym of Haploptychius nautilus (P. Sarasin & F. Sarasin, 1899) (original combination)
- Streptaxis nobilis J. E. Gray, 1837: synonym of Gonaxis monrovia (Rang, 1831) (junior synonym)
- Streptaxis normalis Jousseaume, 1889: synonym of Streptartemon glaber normalis (Jousseaume, 1889) (original combination)
- Streptaxis nseudweensis Putzeys, 1899: synonym of Pseudogonaxis nseudweensis (Putzeys, 1899)
- Streptaxis occidentalis Heude, 1885: synonym of Haploptychius occidentalis (Heude, 1885) (original combination)
- Streptaxis ordinarius E. A. Smith, 1890: synonym of Gonaxis denticulatus (Dohrn, 1878) (junior synonym)
- Streptaxis pellucens L. Pfeiffer, 1863: synonym of Haploptychius pellucens (L. Pfeiffer, 1863) (original combination)
- Streptaxis peroteti (Petit de la Saussaye, 1841): synonym of Perrottetia peroteti (Petit de la Saussaye, 1841) (unaccepted combination)
- Streptaxis pfeifferi Zelebor, 1867: synonym of Haploptychius pfeifferi (Zelebor, 1867) (original combination)
- Streptaxis porrecta L. Pfeiffer, 1863: synonym of Haploptychius porrectus (L. Pfeiffer, 1863)
- Streptaxis prostrata Gould in L. Pfeiffer, 1856: synonym of Gonaxis prostratus (Gould in L. Pfeiffer, 1856)
- Streptaxis pusillus E. von Martens, 1897: synonym of Gonaxis pusillus (E. von Martens, 1897) synonym of Pseudogonaxis pusillus (E. von Martens, 1897)
- Streptaxis pyriformis L. Pfeiffer in Philippi, 1845: synonym of Odontartemon (Perrottetia) pyriformis (L. Pfeiffer in Philippi, 1845)
- Streptaxis regius Lobbecke, 1881: synonym of Rectartemon regius (C.H.W.T. Löbbecke, 1881)
- Streptaxis scalptus W. T. Blanford, 1899: synonym of Perrottetia scalptus (W. T. Blanford, 1899)
- Streptaxis schweitzeri Dohrn, 1878: synonym of Gonaxis schweitzeri (Dohrn, 1878)
- Streptaxis sinensis Gould, 1859: synonym of Haploptychius sinensis (Gould, 1859)
- Streptaxis souleyetiana (Petit de la Saussaye, 1841): synonym of Gonaxis souleyetianus (Petit de la Saussaye, 1841) accepted as Seychellaxis souleyetianus (Petit de la Saussaye, 1841)
- Streptaxis streptodon (Moricand, 1851): synonym of Streptartemon streptodon (S. Moricand, 1851)
- Streptaxis theobaldi Benson, 1859: synonym of Perrottetia theobaldi (Benson, 1859)
- Streptaxis translucidus Dupuis & Putzeys, 1902: synonym of Gonaxis translucidus (Dupuis & Putzeys, 1902)
- Streptaxis tridens Möllendorff, 1898: synonym of Indoartemon tridens (Möllendorff, 1898)
- Streptaxis troberti (Petit de la Saussaye, 1841): synonym of Lamelliger troberti (Petit de la Saussaye, 1841)
- Streptaxis turbinata Morelet, 1867: synonym of Gonaxis turbinatus (Morelet, 1867)
- Streptaxis watsoni W. T. Blanford & H. F. Blanford, 1860: synonym of Perrottetia watsoni (W. T. Blanford & H. F. Blanford, 1860)
- Streptaxis welwitschi Morelet, 1867: synonym of Gonaxis welwitschi (Morelet, 1867)
