= Microstrophia nana =

Conservation status
- Vulnerable (IUCN 2.3)

Scientific classification
- Kingdom: Animalia
- Phylum: Mollusca
- Class: Gastropoda
- Order: Stylommatophora
- Family: Streptaxidae
- Genus: Microstrophia
- Species: M. nana

Binomial name
- Microstrophia nana Peile, 1936

Species of gastropod

Microstrophia nana is a species of small, air-breathing land snail, a terrestrial pulmonate gastropod mollusk in the family Streptaxidae.

This species is endemic to Mauritius.
