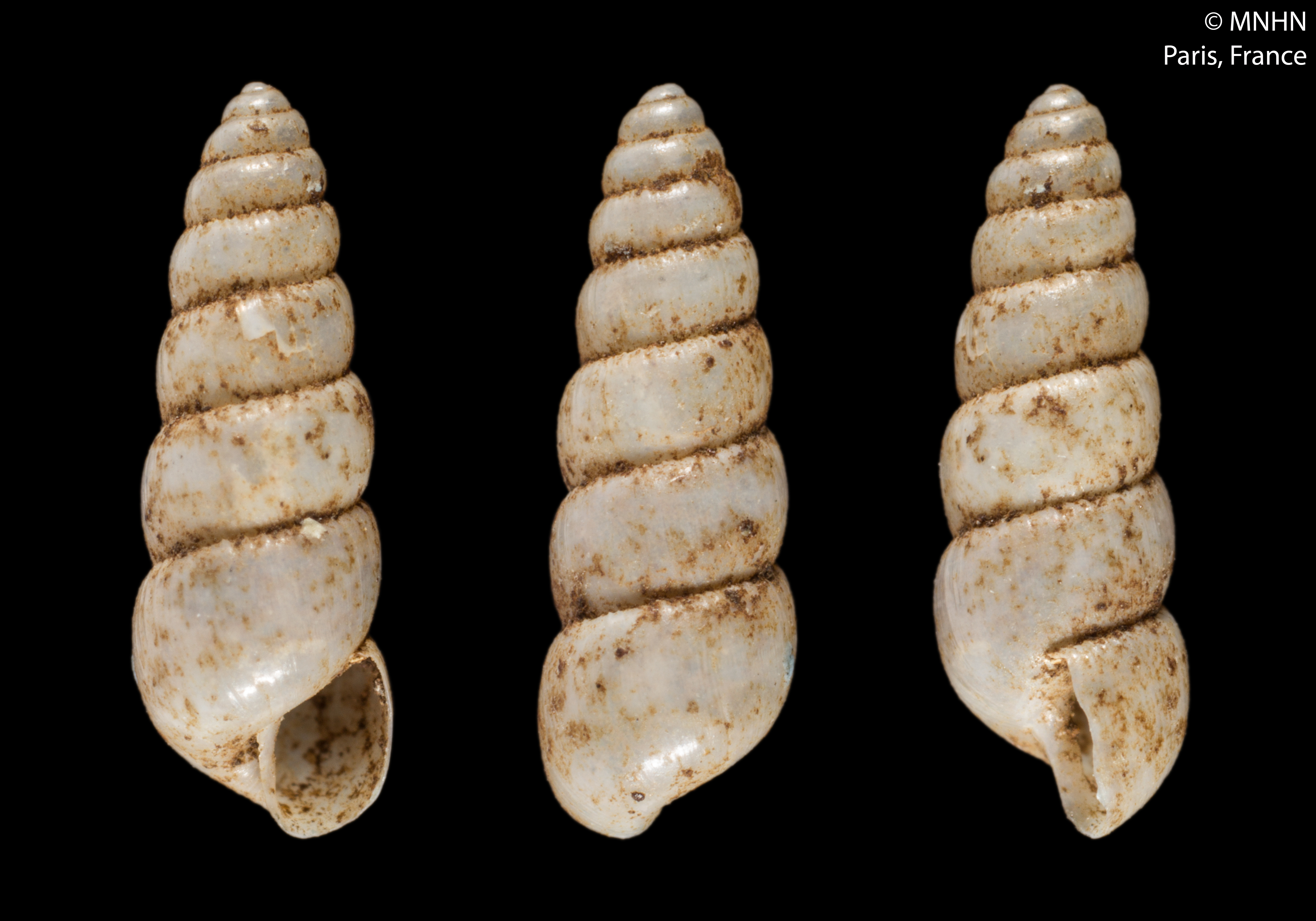
- a shell of Streptostele vitroni (holotype at MNHN, Paris)

Scientific classification
- Domain: Eukaryota
- Kingdom: Animalia
- Phylum: Mollusca
- Class: Gastropoda
- Order: Stylommatophora
- Superfamily: Streptaxoidea
- Family: Streptaxidae
- Genus: Streptostele; Dohrn, 1866

Type species
- Bulimus fastigiatus Morelet, 1848

Synonyms
- Campylaxis Ancey, 1888; Ischnostele C. R. Boettger, 1915; Raffraya Bourguignat, 1883; Streptostele (Graptostele) Pilsbry, 1919 · alternate representation; Streptostele (Raffraya) Bourguignat, 1883 · alternate representation; Streptostele (Streptostele) Dohrn, 1866 · alternate representation; Streptostele (Textostele) Venmans, 1959 · alternate representation; Streptostele (Varicostele) Pilsbry, 1919 · alternate representation; Varicostele Pilsbry, 1919

= Streptostele =

Genus of gastropods

Streptostele is a genus of air-breathing land snails, terrestrial pulmonate gastropod mollusks in the subfamily Enneinae of the family Streptaxidae.

== Distribution ==
Indigenous distribution of the genus Streptostele include:

- Afrotropical: Uganda (4 described species, 2 undescribed species),...
- islands in the Gulf of Guinea
- the Seychelles
- Comoros
- Mascarenes

== Species ==
Species within the genus Streptostele include:

- Streptostele abbreviata D. T. Holyoak, G. A. Holyoak & Sinclair, 2020
- Streptostele acicula (Morelet, 1877)
- Streptostele alluaudi Dautzenberg & Germain, 1914
- Streptostele angustior (Preston, 1911)
- Streptostele arambourgi Germain, 1934
- Streptostele auriformis Connolly, 1922
- Streptostele babaulti Germain, 1919
- Streptostele bacillum Pilsbry, 1919
- Streptostele bequaerti Pilsbry, 1919
- Streptostele bequaertiana (Pilsbry, 1919)
- Streptostele buchholzi E. von Martens, 1876
- Streptostele candelula Connolly, 1922
- Streptostele centralis Pilsbry, 1919
- Streptostele cheranganiensis Germain, 1934
- Streptostele clara Connolly, 1922
- Streptostele clavulus Connolly, 1922
- Streptostele coloba Pilsbry, 1919
- Streptostele columna Connolly, 1922
- Streptostele congoris Pilsbry, 1919
- Streptostele constricta Connolly, 1922
- Streptostele costulata E. von Martens, 1892
- Streptostele crassicrenulata Connolly, 1922
- Streptostele crassiplicata Connolly, 1922
- Streptostele crenulata (E.A. Smith, 1901)
- Streptostele curvata Connolly, 1922
- Streptostele curvicolumella (Connolly, 1922)
- Streptostele cylindrica Connolly, 1922
- Streptostele decaryi (Fischer-Piette, Blanc, F. & Vukadinovic, 1974)
- Streptostele elegans (Dautzenberg & Germain, 1914)
- Streptostele elgonensis Connolly, 1922
- Streptostele elongata Connolly, 1922
- Streptostele exasperata Preston, 1912
- Streptostele fallooni Connolly, 1922
- Streptostele fastigiata (Morelet, 1848)
- Streptostele feai Germain, 1912
- Streptostele folini (Morelet, 1858)
- Streptostele hasta Connolly, 1922
- Streptostele herma Connolly, 1912
- Streptostele horei E. A. Smith, 1890
- Streptostele inconspicua van Bruggen, 1964
- Streptostele iota Connolly, 1922
- Streptostele jaeckeli Venmans, 1959
- Streptostele jeanneli Germain, 1934
- Streptostele jod Connolly, 1922
- Streptostele kenyana Connolly, 1922
- Streptostele kilimanjaroensis Blume, 1965
- Streptostele klemmi Blume, 1959
- Streptostele langi Pilsbry, 1919
- Streptostele lenta (E. A. Smith, 1903)
- Streptostele leopoldvillensis Pilsbry, 1919
- Streptostele leroii (C. R. Boettger, 1915)
- Streptostele lessensis (Pilsbry, 1919)
- Streptostele limpida (E. von Martens, 1897)
- Streptostele milneedwardsi (Bourguignat, 1883)
- Streptostele minor E. von Martens, 1897
- Streptostele modelli Blume, 1952
- Streptostele monotropha (Germain, 1934)
- Streptostele moreletiana Dohrn, 1866
- Streptostele nitida Neubert, 2004
- Streptostele nyiroensis Connolly, 1922
- Streptostele ordinaria Connolly, 1922
- Streptostele oribates Connolly, 1922
- Streptostele osculum Connolly, 1922
- Streptostele patruelis Connolly, 1922
- Streptostele polymorpha Preston, 1912
- Streptostele rutshuruensis (Pilsbry, 1919)
- Streptostele sanctuarii van Bruggen, 1966
- Streptostele scotti Connolly, 1941
- Streptostele signata Connolly, 1922
- Streptostele simplex E. A. Smith, 1890
- Streptostele sinuilabiata Connolly, 1922
- Streptostele streptosteloides (E. von Martens, 1897)
- Streptostele subangusta E. von Martens, 1891
- Streptostele subvaricosa (E. von Martens, 1897)
- Streptostele suradensis Connolly, 1931
- Streptostele terebra (Preston, 1911)
- Streptostele teres Pilsbry, 1919
- Streptostele truncata Germain, 1915
- Streptostele unidentata Connolly, 1922
- Streptostele urguessensis Connolly, 1922
- Streptostele validor Connolly, 1922
- Streptostele varicosa (d'Ailly, 1910)
- Streptostele venusta (E. A. Smith, 1903)
- Streptostele vicina (Preston, 1911)
- Streptostele vitroni Fischer-Piette, C. P. Blanc, F. Blanc & F. Salvat, 1994
- Streptostele zambiensis Pilsbry, 1919

subgenus ?

- "Streptostele (Streptostele) species A" from Uganda
- "Streptostele (Streptostele) species B" from Uganda

== Synonyms ==
- Streptostele bonjongoensis Tryon, 1885: synonym of Rhabdogulella buchholzi (E. von Martens, 1876) (unnecessary, unused replacement name)
- Streptostele dautzenbergi Pilsbry, 1919: synonym of Streptostele minor E. von Martens, 1897 (junior synonym)
- Streptostele insignis (E. A. Smith, 1898): synonym of Streptostele musaecola (Morelet, 1860): synonym of Tomostele musaecola (Morelet, 1860) (junior synonym)
- Streptostele lucida (J. S. Gibbons, 1879): synonym of Streptostele bawriensis (Pilsbry, 1905) (junior secondary homonym replaced by Opeas bawriense Pilsbry, 1905)
- Streptostele maheensis Connolly, 1925: synonym of Streptostele acicula (Morelet, 1877) (junior synonym)
- Streptostele meridionalis van Bruggen, 1966: synonym of Streptostele herma Connolly, 1912 (junior synonym)
- Streptostele musaecola (Morelet, 1860): synonym of Tomostele musaecola (Morelet, 1860)
- Streptostele roccatii (Pollonera, 1906): synonym of Primigulella linguifera (E. von Martens, 1895)
