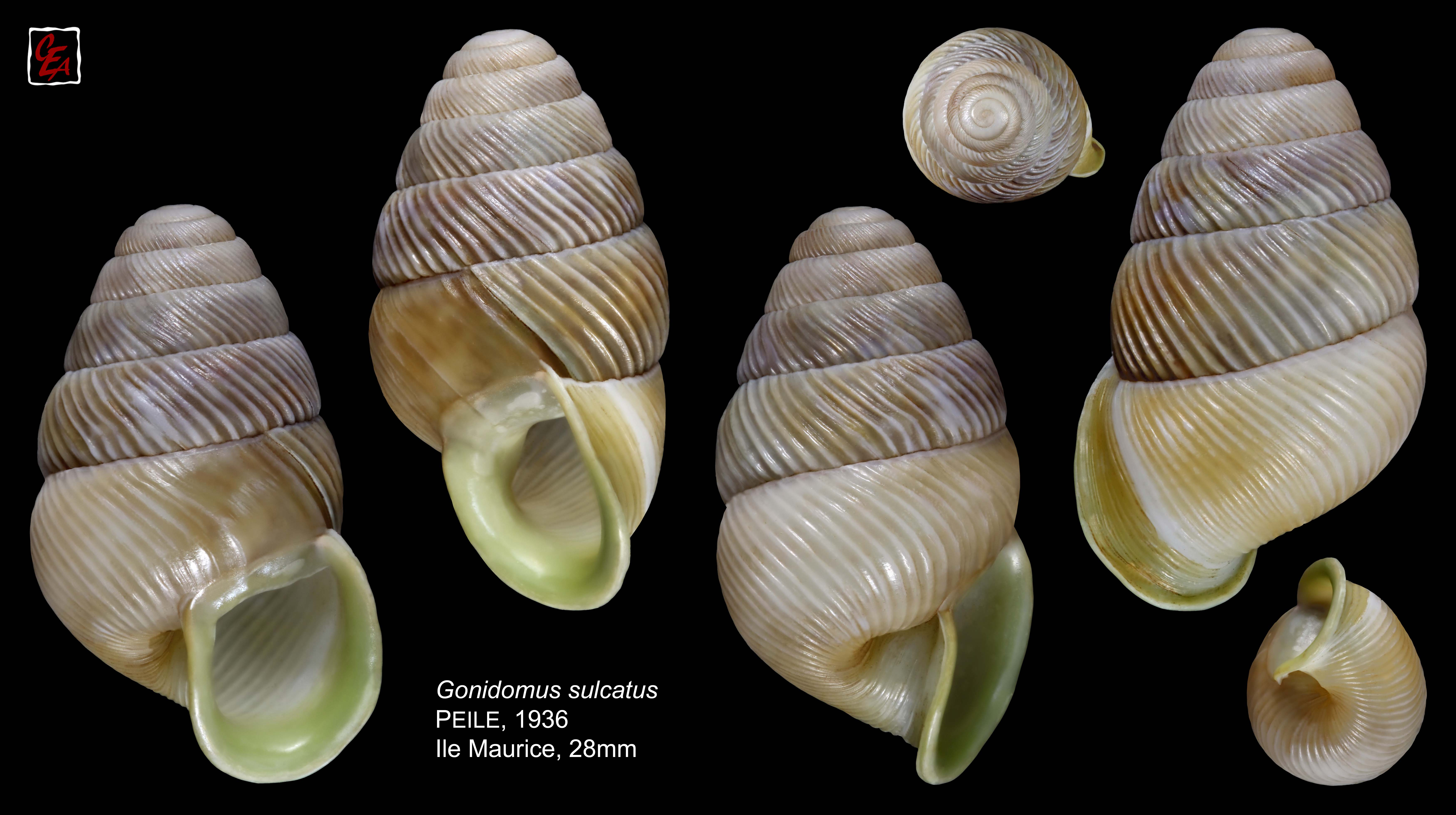
- Gonidomus sulcatus

Conservation status
- Vulnerable (IUCN 2.3)

Scientific classification
- Kingdom: Animalia
- Phylum: Mollusca
- Class: Gastropoda
- Order: Stylommatophora
- Family: Streptaxidae
- Genus: Gonidomus
- Species: G. sulcatus

Binomial name
- Gonidomus sulcatus Peile, 1936

= Gonidomus sulcatus =

Species of gastropod

Gonidomus sulcatus is a species of air-breathing land snail, a terrestrial pulmonate gastropod mollusc in the family Streptaxidae.

The species is endemic to Mauritius.
