= Microstrophia modesta =

Conservation status
- Endangered (IUCN 2.3)

Scientific classification
- Kingdom: Animalia
- Phylum: Mollusca
- Class: Gastropoda
- Order: Stylommatophora
- Family: Streptaxidae
- Genus: Microstrophia
- Species: M. modesta

Binomial name
- Microstrophia modesta Adams, 1867

Species of gastropod

Microstrophia modesta is a species of air-breathing land snail, terrestrial pulmonate gastropod mollusc in the family Streptaxidae.

This species is endemic to Mauritius.
