= Gonaxis usambarensis =

Conservation status
- Data Deficient (IUCN 2.3)

Scientific classification
- Kingdom: Animalia
- Phylum: Mollusca
- Class: Gastropoda
- Order: Stylommatophora
- Family: Streptaxidae
- Genus: Gonaxis
- Species: G. usambarensis

Binomial name
- Gonaxis usambarensis Verdcourt, 1961

Species of gastropod

Gonaxis usambarensis is a species of air-breathing land snail, a terrestrial pulmonate gastropod mollusc in the family Streptaxidae.

This species is endemic to Tanzania.
