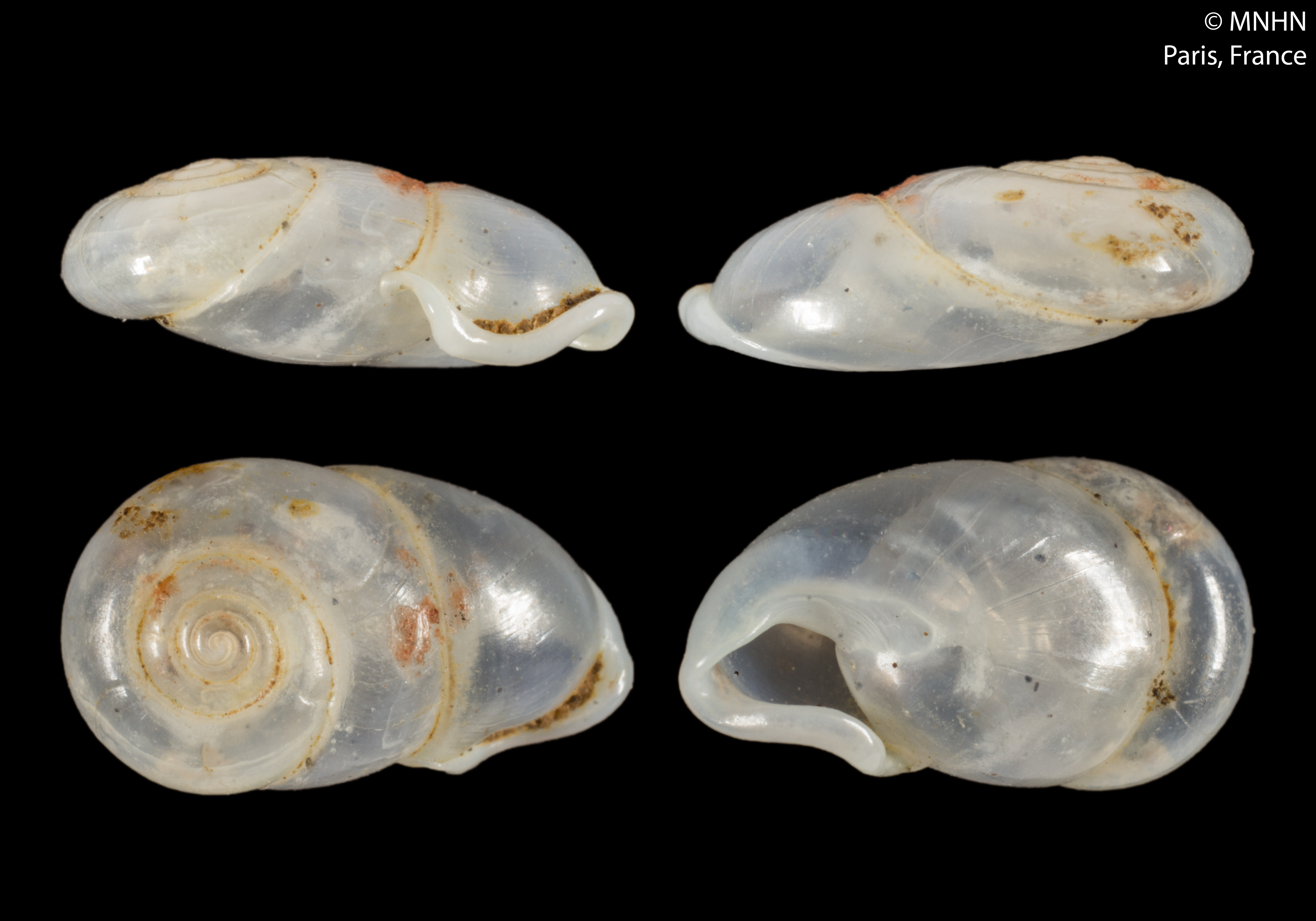
- Shell of Stemmatopsis poirieri (syntype at MNHN, Paris)

Scientific classification
- Kingdom: Animalia
- Phylum: Mollusca
- Class: Gastropoda
- Order: Stylommatophora
- Suborder: Achatinina
- Superfamily: Streptaxoidea
- Family: Streptaxidae
- Genus: Stemmatopsis; J. Mabille, 1887

Type species
- Stemmatopsis poirieri Mabille, 1887

= Stemmatopsis =

Genus of gastropods

Stemmatopsis is a genus of air-breathing land snails, terrestrial pulmonate gastropod mollusks in the subfamily Streptaxinae of the family Streptaxidae.

== Distribution ==
The distribution of the genus Stemmatopsis includes:

- north Vietnam

== Species ==
Species within the genus Stemmatopsis include:

- Stemmatopsis arcuatolabris Do Duc Sang, 2021
- Stemmatopsis dolium Do Duc Sang, 2021
- Stemmatopsis nangphaiensis Do Duc Sang & Do Van Nhuong, 2015
- Stemmatopsis poirieri Mabille, 1887
- Stemmatopsis vanhoensis Do Duc Sang & Do Van Nhuong, 2015
