= Juventigulella =

Scientific classification
- Domain: Eukaryota
- Kingdom: Animalia
- Phylum: Mollusca
- Class: Gastropoda
- Order: Stylommatophora
- Superfamily: Streptaxoidea
- Family: Streptaxidae
- Genus: Juventigulella; Tattersfield, 1998

Type species
- Gulella (Juventigulella) habibui Tattersfield, 1998

Synonyms
- Gulella (Juventigulella) Tattersfield, 1998 (distinct genus)

Genus of gastropods

Juventigulella is a genus of very small air-breathing land snails, terrestrial pulmonate gastropod mollusks in the family Streptaxidae, more specifically in the subfamily Primigulellinae.

== Species ==
Species within the genus Juventigulella include:

- Juventigulella amboniensis (Tattersfield, 1998)
- Juventigulella cryptophora (Morelet, 1881)
- Juventigulella habibui (Tattersfield, 1998)
- Juventigulella kimbozae (Verdcourt, 2004)
- Juventigulella ngerezae Rowson, 2007
- Juventigulella peakei (van Bruggen, 1975)
- Juventigulella spinosa (Tattersfield, 1998)
