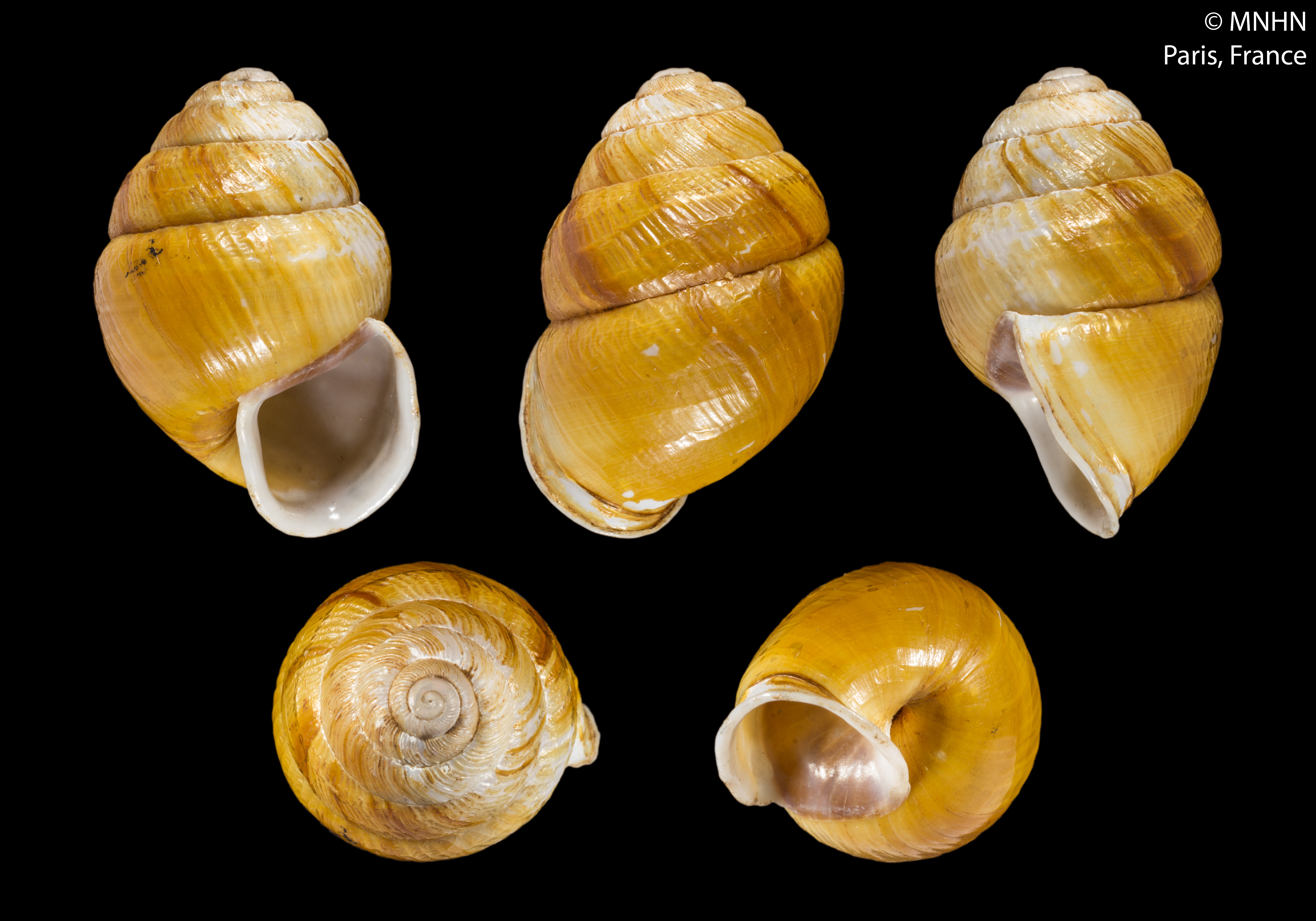
- Shell of Gonidomus concamerata (syntype at MNHN, Paris)

Scientific classification
- Kingdom: Animalia
- Phylum: Mollusca
- Class: Gastropoda
- Order: Stylommatophora
- Suborder: Achatinina
- Superfamily: Streptaxoidea
- Family: Streptaxidae
- Genus: Gonidomus; Swainson, 1840

Type species
- Pupa pagoda Lesson, 1831

Synonyms
- Gibbus (Gonidomus) Swainson, 1840 (superseded combination); Idolum L. Pfeiffer, 1856 (junior synonym)

= Gonidomus =

Genus of gastropods

Gonidomus is a genus of air-breathing land snails, terrestrial pulmonate gastropod mollusks in the subfamily Orthogibbinae of the family Streptaxidae.

== Distribution ==
The genus Gonidomus was endemic to Mauritius and it is now extinct.

== Species ==
Species within the genus Gonidomus include:

- Gonidomus concamerata (Wood, 1828)
- † Gonidomus newtoni Adams, 1867
- Gonidomus sulcatus Peile, 1936
