= Juventigulella amboniensis =

Conservation status
- Vulnerable (IUCN 2.3)

Scientific classification
- Kingdom: Animalia
- Phylum: Mollusca
- Class: Gastropoda
- Order: Stylommatophora
- Family: Streptaxidae
- Genus: Juventigulella
- Species: J. amboniensis

Binomial name
- Juventigulella amboniensis T(attersfield, 1998)

Synonyms
- Gulella (Juventigulella) amboniensis Tattersfield, 1998 (original combination); Gulella amboniensis Tattersfield, 1998

Species of gastropod

Juventigulella amboniensis is a species of very small air-breathing land snails, terrestrial pulmonate gastropod mollusks in the family Streptaxidae.

== Distribution ==
This species is endemic to Tanzania. Its natural habitat is subtropical or tropical dry forests. It is threatened by habitat loss.
