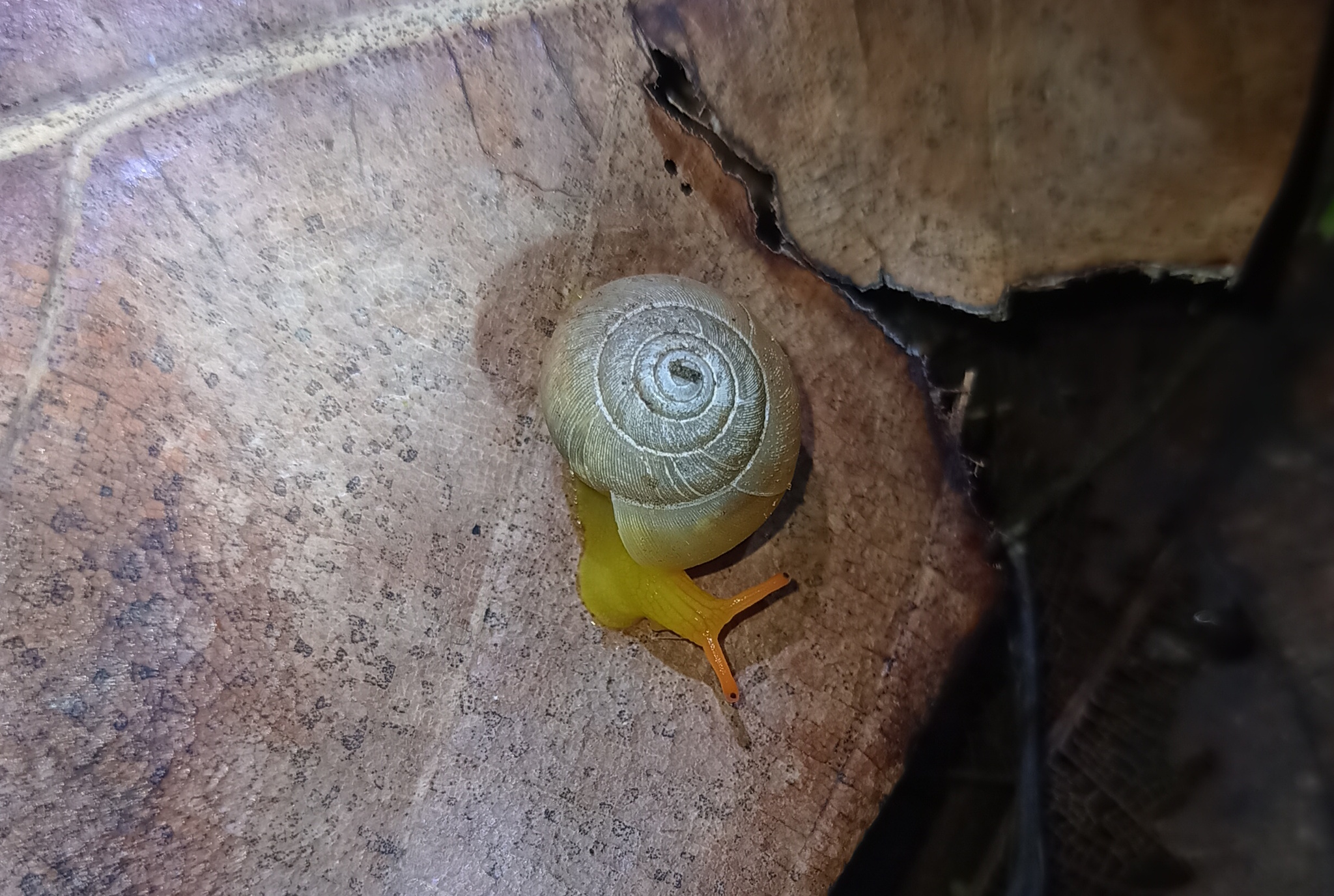
- A live individual of Streptaxis saopaulensis from São Sebastião, Brazil

Scientific classification
- Kingdom: Animalia
- Phylum: Mollusca
- Class: Gastropoda
- Order: Stylommatophora
- Family: Streptaxidae
- Genus: Streptaxis
- Species: S. saopaulensis

Binomial name
- Streptaxis saopaulensis Pilsbry, 1930

Synonyms
- Streptaxis contusus saopaulensis Pilsbry, 1930

= Streptaxis saopaulensis =

Species of gastropod

Streptaxis saopaulensis is a species of air-breathing land snail, a terrestrial pulmonate gastropod mollusk in the family Streptaxidae.

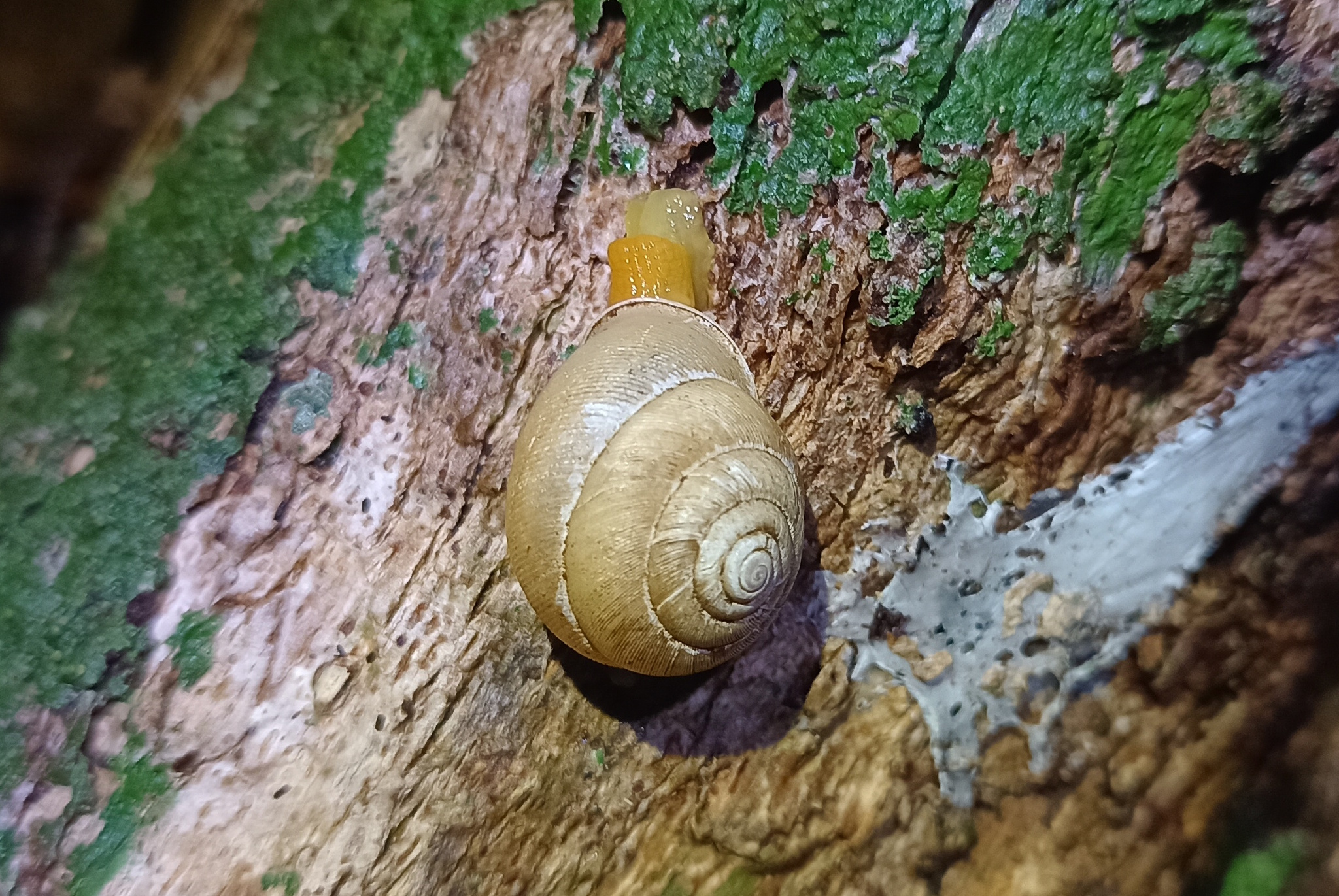
A live individual of Streptaxis saopaulensis in an Atlantic Forest area near the city of São Sebastião, São Paulo state, Brazil

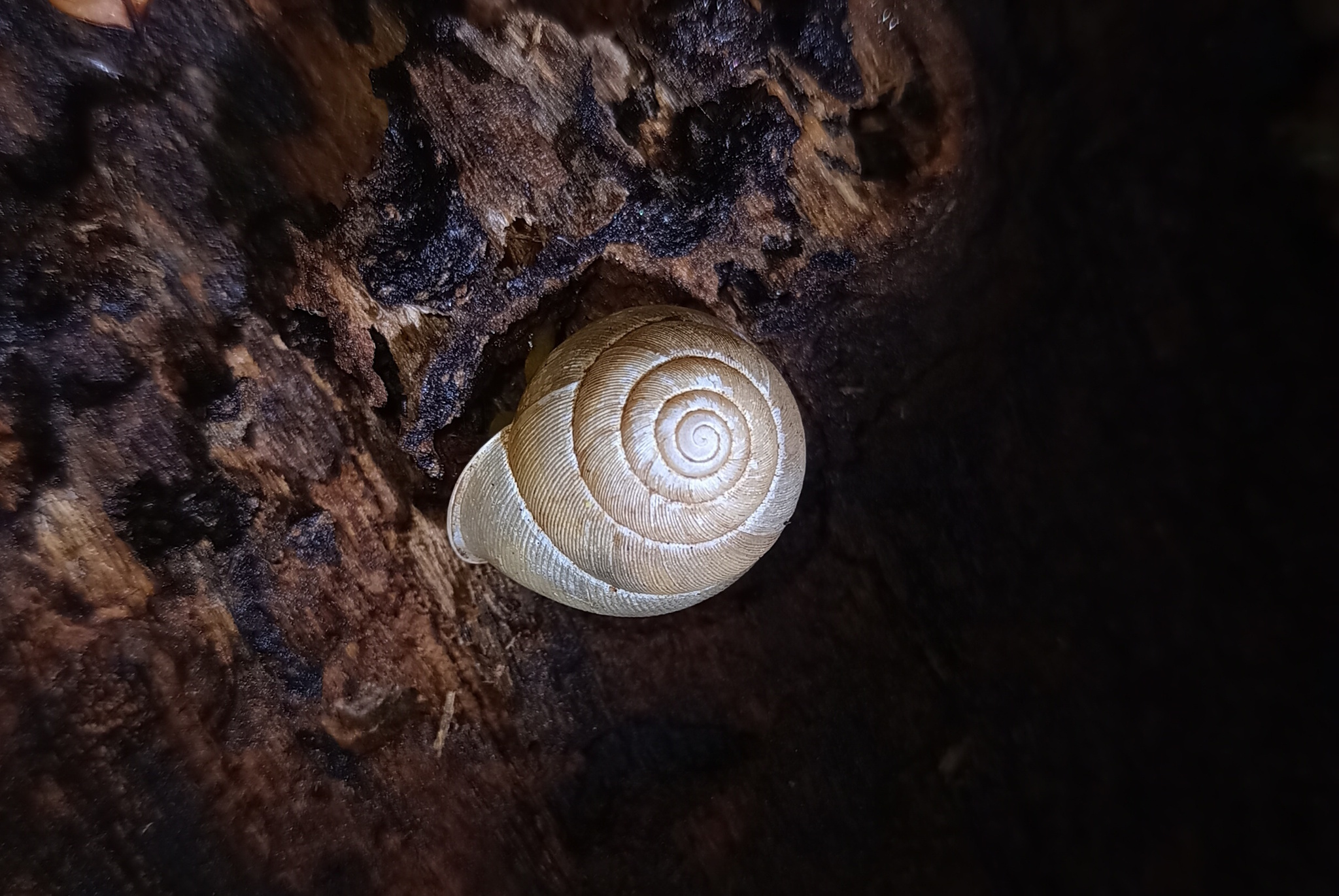
A live individual of Streptaxis saopaulensis retracted into its shell
