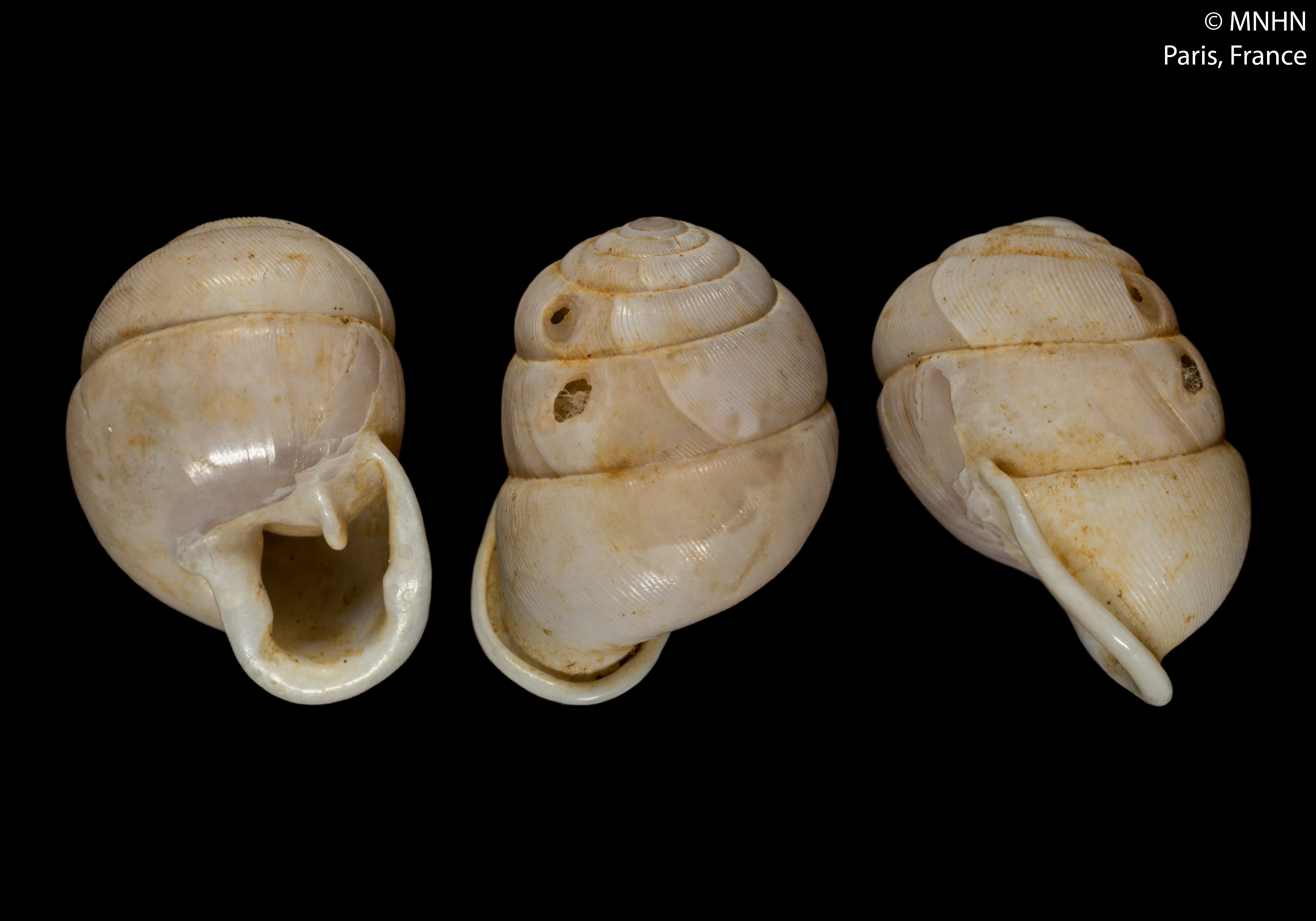
- Shell of Indoartemon huberi (holotype at MNHN, Paris)

Scientific classification
- Domain: Eukaryota
- Kingdom: Animalia
- Phylum: Mollusca
- Class: Gastropoda
- Order: Stylommatophora
- Superfamily: Streptaxoidea
- Family: Streptaxidae
- Genus: Indoartemon; Forcart, 1946

Type species
- Streptaxis eburnea L. Pfeiffer, 1861

Synonyms
- Oophana (Indoartemon) Forcart, 1946 (original rank)

= Indoartemon =

Genus of gastropods

Indoartemon is a genus of air-breathing land snails, terrestrial pulmonate gastropod mollusks in the family Streptaxidae.

== Distribution ==
The distribution of the genus Indoartemon includes:

- Sri Lanka
- South-East Asia
- Hainan, China

== Species ==
- within the genus Indoartemon include:
- Indoartemon cingalensis (Benson, 1853)
- Indoartemon deformis D. S. Do & T. S. Nguyen, 2020
- Indoartemon diodonta Inkhavilay & Panha, 2016
- Indoartemon eburneus (L. Pfeiffer, 1861)
- Indoartemon fuchsianus (Gredler, 1881)
- Indoartemon gracilis (Collet, 1898)
- Indoartemon huberi (Thach, 2016)
- Indoartemon laevis (W. T. Blanford, 1899)
- Indoartemon layardianus (Benson, 1853)
- Indoartemon medius Siriboon & Panha, 2014
- Indoartemon parallelilabris D. S. Do & T. S. Nguyen, 2020
- Indoartemon prestoni (Gude, 1903)
- Indoartemon tridens (Möllendorff, 1898)
- Indoartemon vietnamensis Thach & F. Huber, 2020

Species brought into synonymy

- Indoartemon eburnea (L. Pfeiffer, 1861): synonym of Indoartemon eburneus (L. Pfeiffer, 1861)
