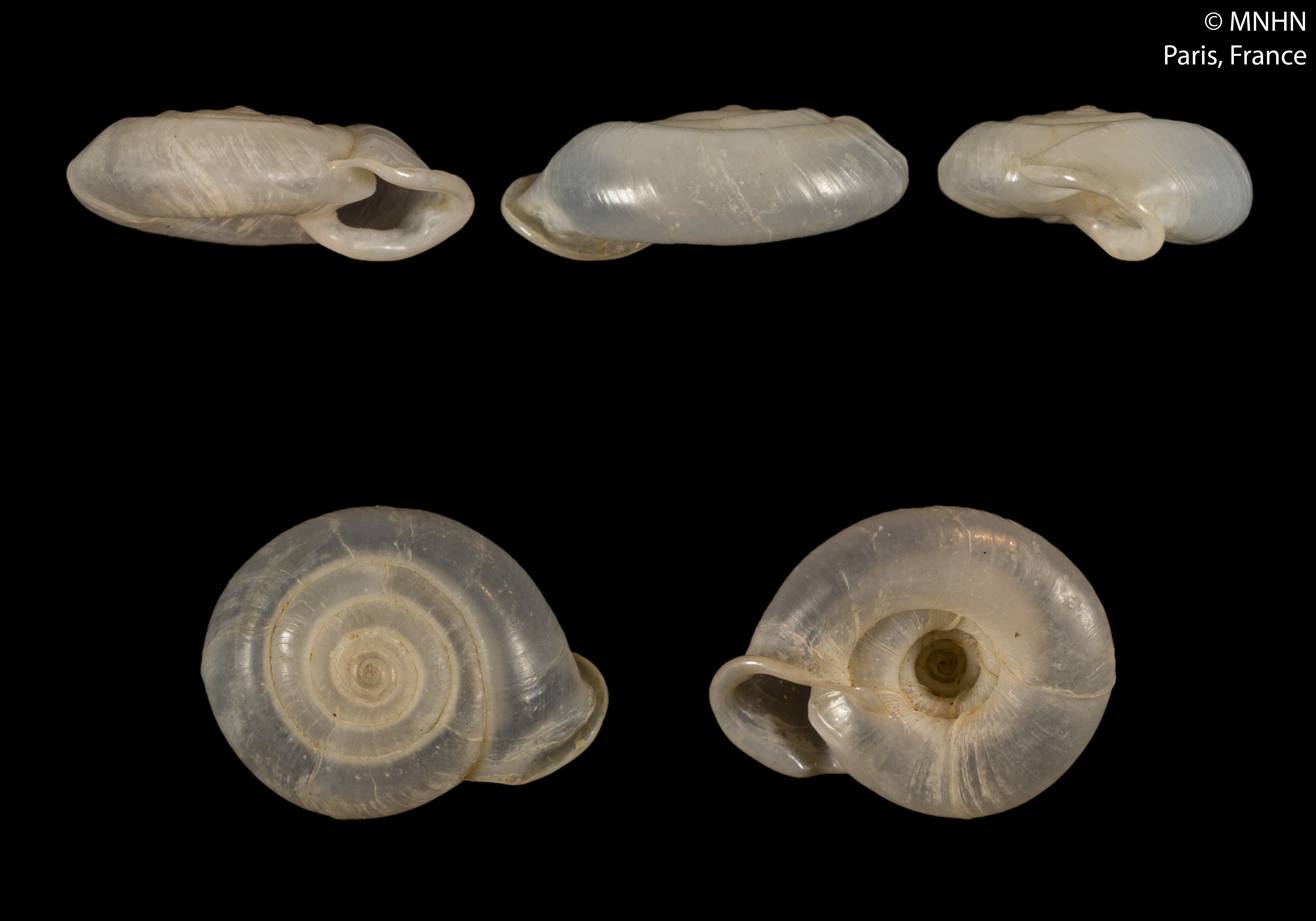
- Shell of Discartemon pallgergelyi (holotype at MNHN, Paris)

Scientific classification
- Kingdom: Animalia
- Phylum: Mollusca
- Class: Gastropoda
- Order: Stylommatophora
- Suborder: Achatinina
- Superfamily: Streptaxoidea
- Family: Streptaxidae
- Genus: Discartemon; Pfeiffer, 1856

Type species
- Streptaxis discus L. Pfeiffer, 1851

Synonyms
- Streptaxis (Discartemon) L. Pfeiffer, 1856 (original rank)

= Discartemon =

Genus of gastropods

Discartemon is a genus of air-breathing land snails, terrestrial pulmonate gastropod mollusks in the family Streptaxidae.

== Distribution ==
The distribution of the genus Discartemon includes South-East Asia.

== Species ==
Species within the genus Discartemon include:

- Discartemon afthonodontia Siriboon & Panha, 2014
- Discartemon circulus Siriboon & Panha, 2014
- Discartemon collingeiSiriboon & Panha, 2014
- Discartemon conicus Siriboon & Panha, 2014
- Discartemon deprima Siriboon & Panha, 2014
- Discartemon discadentus Siriboon & Panha, 2014
- Discartemon discamaximus Siriboon & Panha, 2014
- Discartemon discus (L. Pfeiffer, 1851)
- Discartemon epipedis Siriboon & Panha, 2014
- Discartemon expandus Siriboon & Panha, 2014
- Discartemon flavacandida Siriboon & Panha, 2014
- Discartemon hypocrites van Benthem Jutting, 1954
- Discartemon kotanensis Siriboon & Panha, 2014
- Discartemon leptoglyphus van Benthem Jutting, 1954
- Discartemon megalostraka Siriboon & Panha, 2014
- Discartemon moolenbeeki Maasen, 2016
- Discartemon planus (Fulton, 1899)
- Discartemon platymorphus van Benthem Jutting, 1954
- Discartemon plussensis (de Morgan, 1885)
- Discartemon roebeleni (Möllendorff, 1894)
- Discartemon sagitticallosum Sutcharit, Lin & Panha, 2020
- Discartemon sangkarensis van Benthem Jutting, 1959
- Discartemon stenostomus van Benthem Jutting, 1954
- Discartemon sykesi (Collinge, 1902)
- Discartemon tonywhitteni Sutcharit, Lin & Panha, 2020
- Discartemon triancus Siriboon & Panha, 2014
- Discartemon vandermeermohri van Benthem Jutting, 1959

Species inquirendum

- Discartemon pallgergelyi Thach, 2017 (debated synonym)
