= Pseudogonaxis =

Scientific classification
- Kingdom: Animalia
- Phylum: Mollusca
- Class: Gastropoda
- Order: Stylommatophora
- Suborder: Achatinina
- Superfamily: Streptaxoidea
- Family: Streptaxidae
- Genus: Pseudogonaxis; Thiele, 1932

Type species
- Streptaxis nseudweensis Putzeys, 1899

Synonyms
- Gonaxis (Pseudogonaxis) Thiele, 1932; Tayloria (Pseudogonaxis) Thiele, 1932 (unaccepted rank)

Genus of gastropods

Pseudogonaxis is a genus of air-breathing land snails, terrestrial pulmonate gastropod mollusks in the subfamily Odontartemoninae of the family Streptaxidae.

== Distribution ==
The distribution of the genus Pseudogonaxis includes:

- Congo Basin
- Uganda (1 species)

== Species ==
Species within the genus Pseudogonaxis include:

- Pseudogonaxis cavallii (Pollonera, 1906)
- Pseudogonaxis kirkii (Dohrn, 1865)
- † Pseudogonaxis legetetensis Pickford, 2019
- Pseudogonaxis nseudweensis (Putzeys, 1899)
- Pseudogonaxis percivali (Preston, 1913)
- † Pseudogonaxis protocavallii (Verdcourt, 1963)
- Pseudogonaxis pusillus (Martens, 1897)
- Pseudogonaxis rendille (Verdcourt, 1963)
- Pseudogonaxis stenostoma (Verdcourt, 1965)

Synonyms

- † Pseudogonaxis protocavalii [sic]: synonym of † Pseudogonaxis protocavallii (Verdcourt, 1963) (incorrect subsequent spelling)
