= Parvedentulina =

Scientific classification
- Kingdom: Animalia
- Phylum: Mollusca
- Class: Gastropoda
- Order: Stylommatophora
- Suborder: Achatinina
- Superfamily: Streptaxoidea
- Family: Streptaxidae
- Genus: Parvedentulina; Emberton & Pearce, 2000

Type species
- Parvedentulina ovatostoma Emberton & Pearce, 2000

Synonyms
- Anachis (Parvanachis) Radwin, 1968 (original rank)

Genus of gastropods

Parvedentulina is a genus of air-breathing land snails, terrestrial pulmonate gastropod mollusks in the subfamily Orthogibbinae of the family Streptaxidae.

94 species of Parvedentulina were known in 2002 although the majority of these species were described in 2002. An additional 6 new species of Parvedentulina were described in 2009, and a further 5 new species of Parvedentulina were described in 2010.

== Distribution ==
The genus Parvedentulina is endemic to Madagascar.

== Description ==
The shell of Parvedentulina is small. The spire is high. The shell has ribs on its surface. There are no teeth in the aperture.

Shells of Parvedentulina are similar to those of another streptaxid genus, Gulella.

== Species ==
Species within the genus Parvedentulina include:

- Parvedentulina acutapex Emberton & Pearce, 2000
- Parvedentulina ambatomitatoae Emberton, 2002
- Parvedentulina ambatosorotrae Emberton, 2002
- Parvedentulina ambatovakiae Emberton, 2002
- Parvedentulina analamerae Emberton, 2002
- Parvedentulina andapae Emberton, 2002
- Parvedentulina andavakoerae Emberton, 2002
- Parvedentulina andriantanteliaeK. C. Emberton, Slapcinsky, C. A. Campbell, Rakotondrazafy, Andriamiarison & J. D. Emberton, 2010
- Parvedentulina andringitrae Emberton, 2002
- Parvedentulina anjanaharibei Emberton, 2002
- Parvedentulina anjansudae Emberton, 2002
- Parvedentulina antsahamadioae Emberton, 2002
- Parvedentulina apieostriata Emberton & Pearce, 2000
- Parvedentulina balambasia Emberton, 2002
- Parvedentulina bemarahae Emberton, 2002
- Parvedentulina benjamini
- Parvedentulina betamponae Emberton, 2002
- Parvedentulina betsiakae Emberton, 2002
- Parvedentulina bitika Emberton & Griffiths, 2009
- Parvedentulina celestinae Emberton, 2002
- Parvedentulina conspicua Emberton, 2002
- Parvedentulina crenulata Emberton, 2002
- Parvedentulina delicata Emberton, 2002
- Parvedentulina densagyra Emberton, 2002
- Parvedentulina devolia Emberton, 2002
- Parvedentulina distincta Emberton, 2002
- Parvedentulina elegans Emberton, 2002
- Parvedentulina setra Emberton & Pearce, 2000
- Parvedentulina farihiambonia Emberton, 2002
- Parvedentulina fenni Emberton, 2002
- Parvedentulina fortistriata Emberton, 2002
- Parvedentulina fotobohitrae Emberton, 2002
- Parvedentulina fragilis Emberton, 2002
- Parvedentulina fusiforma Emberton, 2002
- Parvedentulina glesi (Fischer-Piette, Blanc, Blanc & Salvat, 1994)
- Parvedentulina gracilis Emberton, 2002
- Parvedentulina hafa Emberton, 2002
- Parvedentulina hatairana Emberton, 2002
- Parvedentulina horonanladia Emberton, 2002
- Parvedentulina jeani K. C. Emberton, Slapcinsky, C. A. Campbell, Rakotondrazafy, Andriamiarison & J. D. Emberton, 2010
- Parvedentulina josephinae Emberton, 2002
- Parvedentulina kelivitsika Emberton, 2002
- Parvedentulina kendrae Emberton & Griffiths, 2009
- Parvedentulina lalina Emberton, 2002
- Parvedentulina lincolni Emberton & Griffiths, 2009
- Parvedentulina macroconspicua Emberton, 2002
- Parvedentulina magna Emberton, 2002
- Parvedentulina mahalevona Emberton, 2002
- Parvedentulina mahialamboensis Emberton & Pearce, 2000
- Parvedentulina mahitsia Emberton, 2002
- Parvedentulina malala Emberton, 2002
- Parvedentulina mamirapiratra Emberton, 2002
- Parvedentulina mananarae Emberton, 2002
- Parvedentulina mandenae Emberton, 2002
- Parvedentulina manja Emberton, 2002
- Parvedentulina manomboae Emberton, 2002
- Parvedentulina manomponae Emberton, 2002
- Parvedentulina maranitra Emberton, 2002
- Parvedentulina margostriata Emberton & Pearce, 2000
- Parvedentulina marojejyae Emberton, 2002
- Parvedentulina masoalae Emberton, 2002
- Parvedentulina metula (Crosse, 1881)
- Parvedentulina miaranoniae Emberton, 2002
- Parvedentulina michellae Emberton & Griffiths, 2009
- Parvedentulina mijanona Emberton, 2002
- Parvedentulina minidistincta Emberton, 2002
- Parvedentulina minutissima Emberton, 2002
- Parvedentulina miova Emberton & Griffiths, 2009
- Parvedentulina montana Emberton, 2002
- Parvedentulina morontsiraka Emberton, 2002
- Parvedentulina namorokae Emberton, 2002
- Parvedentulina ovatostoma Emberton & Pearce, 2000
- Parvedentulina parva Emberton, 2002
- Parvedentulina pascali Emberton, 2002
- Parvedentulina paulayiK. C. Emberton, Slapcinsky, C. A. Campbell, Rakotondrazafy, Andriamiarison & J. D. Emberton, 2010
- Parvedentulina pearcei Emberton, 2002
- Parvedentulina planapex Emberton, 2002
- Parvedentulina puichella Emberton, 2002
- Parvedentulina pyramida Emberton, 2002
- Parvedentulina ranomafanae Emberton, 2002
- Parvedentulina rantovina Emberton, 2002
- Parvedentulina rapetoa Emberton, 2002
- Parvedentulina ravinamatia Emberton, 2002
- Parvedentulina rogeri Emberton & Pearce, 2000
- Parvedentulina sahantananae Emberton, 2002
- Parvedentulina saintjacqui W. H. Turton, 1932
- Parvedentulina simeni (Fischer-Piette, Blanc, Blanc & Salvat, 1994)
- Parvedentulina simplex Emberton, 2002
- Parvedentulina soa Emberton & Griffiths, 2009
- Parvedentulina tendrombohitra Emberton, 2002
- Parvedentulina terakabe Emberton, 2002
- Parvedentulina texieri Emberton, 2002
- Parvedentulina thompsoniK. C. Emberton, Slapcinsky, C. A. Campbell, Rakotondrazafy, Andriamiarison & J. D. Emberton, 2010
- Parvedentulina tsara Emberton, 2002
- Parvedentulina tsaratananae Emberton, 2002
- Parvedentulina tsaravintana Emberton, 2002
- Parvedentulina lsimahialamboensis Emberton, 2002
- Parvedentulina tsingia Emberton, 2002
- Parvedentulina tsipika Emberton, 2002
- Parvedentulina tsisubulina Emberton, 2002
- Parvedentulina tsotra Emberton, 2002
- Parvedentulina unescoae Emberton, 2002
- Parvedentulina vavalava Emberton, 2002
- Parvedentulina vitroni (Fischer-Piette. Blanc, Blanc & Salvat, 1994)
- Parvedentulina vonjena Emberton, 2002
- Parvedentulina sp. 1 sensu Emberton & Griffiths (2009)
- Parvedentulina sp. 2 sensu Emberton & Griffiths (2009)
