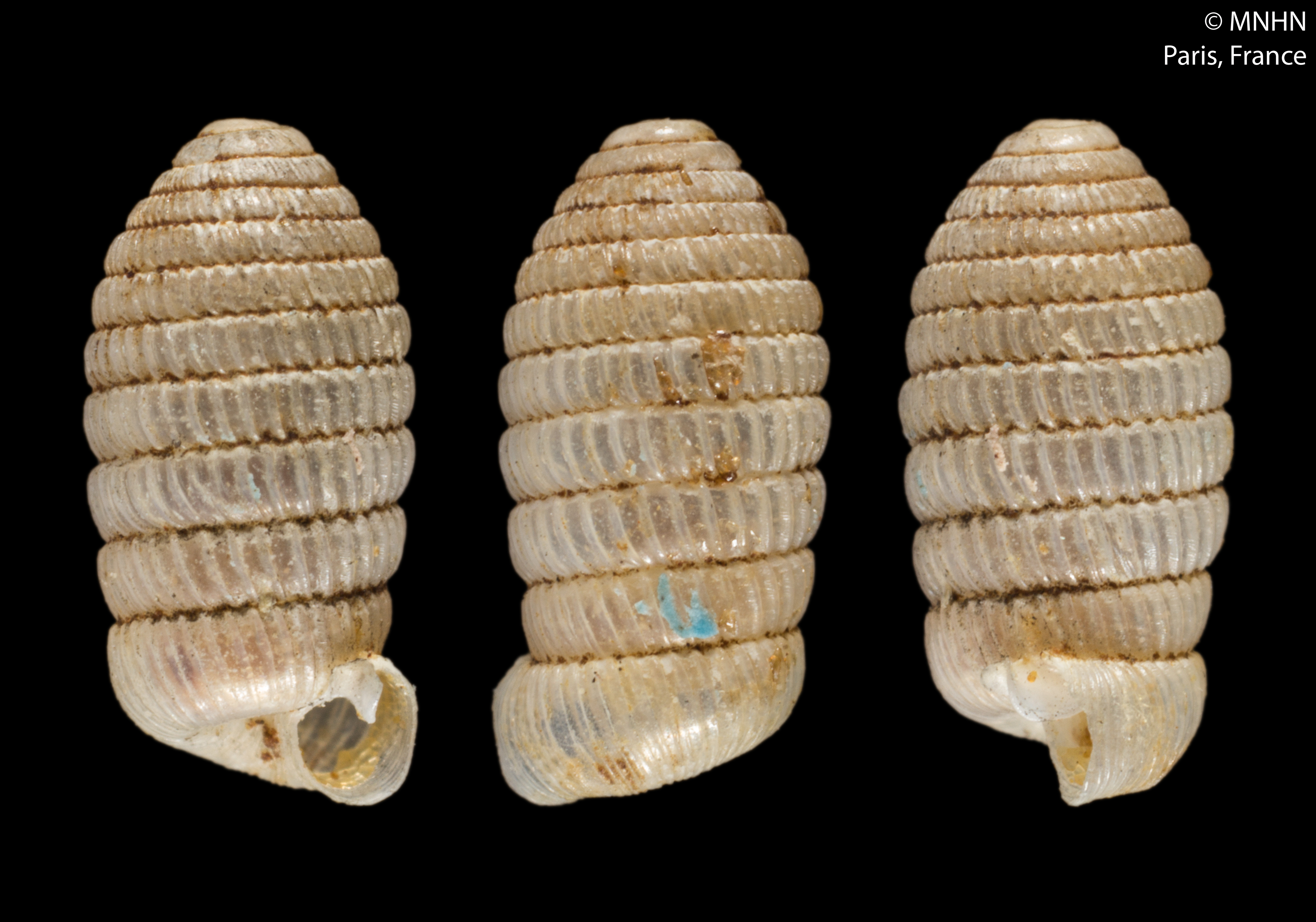
- Shell of Microstrophia goudoti (holotype at MNHN, Paris)

Scientific classification
- Kingdom: Animalia
- Phylum: Mollusca
- Class: Gastropoda
- Order: Stylommatophora
- Suborder: Achatinina
- Superfamily: Streptaxoidea
- Family: Streptaxidae
- Genus: Microstrophia; Möllendorff, 1887

Type species
- Pupa clavulata Lamarck, 1822

Synonyms
- Ennea (Microstrophia) Möllendorff, 1887; Gibbulina (Nevillia) Martens, 1880 (invalid: junior homonym of Nevillia H. Adams, 1868); Gonospira (Microstrophia) Möllendorff, 1887; Nevillia E. von Martens, 1880 (junior homonym of Nevillia H. Adams, 1868)

= Microstrophia =

Genus of gastropods

Microstrophia is a genus of air-breathing land snails, terrestrial pulmonate gastropod mollusks in the subfamily Enneinae of the family Streptaxidae.

== Distribution ==
Distribution of the genus Microstrophia include:

- Mauritius
- Réunion

== Species ==
Species within the genus Microstrophia include:

- Microstrophia abnormala Griffiths & Florens, 2004 †
- Microstrophia baideri Griffiths & Florens, 2004 †
- Microstrophia clavulata (Lamarck, 1822)
- Microstrophia goudoti (Fischer-Piette, Blanc, C.P., Blanc, F. & Salvat, 1994)
- Microstrophia jacobsi (Griffiths, 2000)
- Microstrophia modesta Adams, 1867
- Microstrophia nana Peile, 1936
- Microstrophia toudogi (Fischer-Piette, Blanc, C.P., Blanc, F. & Salvat, 1994)

Species brought into synonymy

- Microstrophia cryptophora (Morelet, 1881): synonym of Juventigulella cryptophora (Morelet, 1881) (superseded combination)
