= Tomostele =

Scientific classification
- Kingdom: Animalia
- Phylum: Mollusca
- Class: Gastropoda
- Order: Stylommatophora
- Suborder: Achatinina
- Superfamily: Streptaxoidea
- Family: Streptaxidae
- Genus: Tomostele; Ancey, 1885

Type species
- Achatina musaecola Morelet, 1860

Synonyms
- Eustreptostele Germain, 1915; Leptinaria (Luntia) E. A. Smith, 1898 (junior synonym); Luntia E.A. Smith, 1898 (junior synonym); Streptostele (Eustreptostele) Germain, 1915; Streptostele (Tomostele) Ancey, 1885 ·

Genus of gastropods

Tomostele is a genus of air-breathing land snails, terrestrial pulmonate gastropod molluscs in the subfamily Enneinae of the family Streptaxidae.

== Species ==
- Tomostele musaecola (Morelet, 1860)
