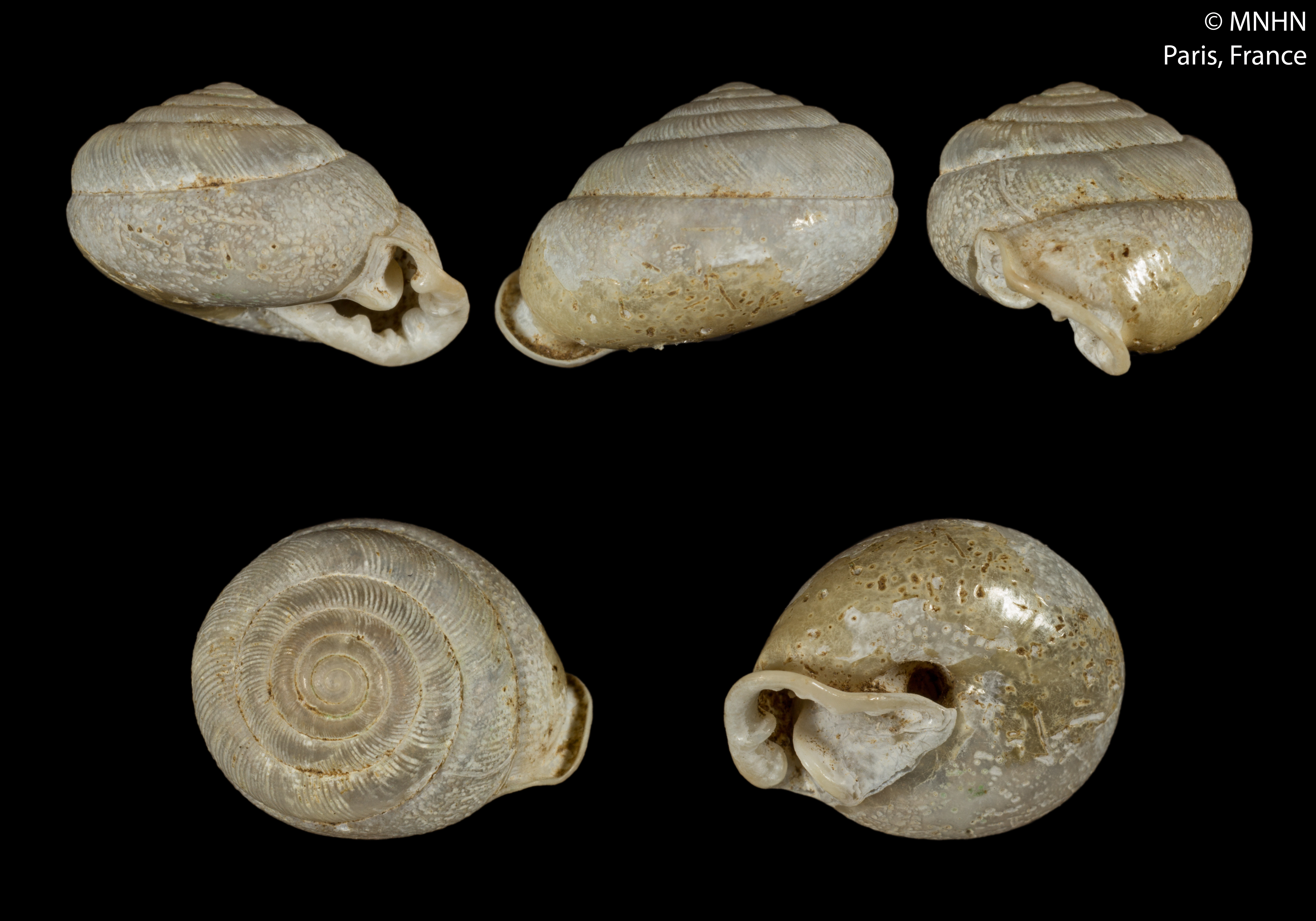
- Shell of Oophana huberi (holotype at MNHN, Paris)

Scientific classification
- Kingdom: Animalia
- Phylum: Mollusca
- Class: Gastropoda
- Order: Stylommatophora
- Suborder: Achatinina
- Superfamily: Streptaxoidea
- Family: Streptaxidae
- Genus: Oophana; Ancey, 1884

Type species
- Ennea bulbulus Morelet, 1862

Synonyms
- Streptaxis (Oophana) Ancey, 1884 (original rank)

= Oophana =

Genus of gastropods

Oophana is a genus of air-breathing land snails, terrestrial pulmonate gastropod mollusks in the subfamily Streptaxinae of the family Streptaxidae.

== Distribution ==
Distribution of the genus Oophana include:

- South-East Asia

== Species ==
Species within the genus Oophana include:

- Oophana acuticarina van Benthem Jutting, 1961
- Oophana atopospira van Benthem Jutting, 1954
- Oophana balingensis (Tomlin, 1948)
- Oophana bulbulus (Morelet, 1862) - type species
- Oophana diaphanopepla van Benthem Jutting
- Oophana diplodon (Möllendorff, 1900)
- Oophana eutropha van Benthem Jutting, 1954
- Oophana elisa Gould, 1856
- Oophana huberi Thach, 2018
- Oophana michaui (Crosse & P. Fischer, 1863)
- Oophana pachyglottis (Möllendorff, 1900)
- Oophana siamensis (L. Pfeiffer, 1862)
- Oophana striatula (Collinge, 1902)
- Oophana thamnophila van Benthem Jutting, 1954
- Oophana thuthaoae Thach, 2017
- Oophana tiomanensis Clements, 2006
