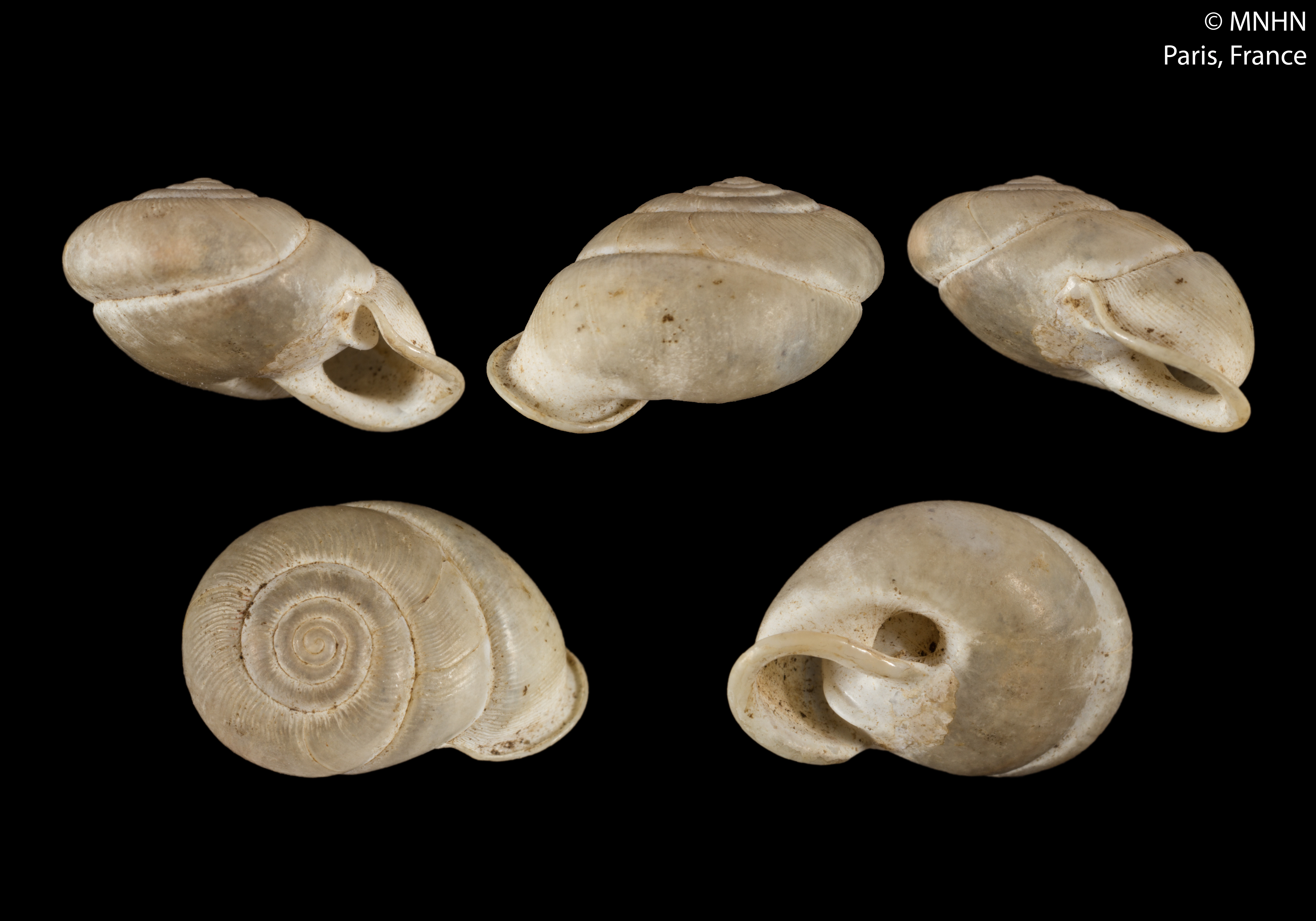
- Shell of Haploptychius blaisei (holotype at MNHN, Paris)

Scientific classification
- Kingdom: Animalia
- Phylum: Mollusca
- Class: Gastropoda
- Order: Stylommatophora
- Suborder: Achatinina
- Superfamily: Streptaxoidea
- Family: Streptaxidae
- Genus: Haploptychius; Kobelt, 1905

Type species
- Streptaxis sinensis Gould, 1859

Synonyms
- Oophana (Haploptychius) Kobelt, 1905; Pseudartemon J. Mabille, 1887

= Haploptychius =

Genus of gastropods

Haploptychius is a genus of air-breathing land snails, terrestrial pulmonate gastropod mollusks in the family Streptaxidae.

== Distribution ==
The distribution of the genus Haploptychius includes:

- Andaman Islands and south India
- South-East Asia
- southern and central China
- North Sulawesi

== Species ==
Species within the genus Haploptychius include:

- Haploptychius anceyi (Mabille, 1887)
- Haploptychius andamanicus (Benson, 1860)
- Haploptychius anhduongae Thach, 2017
- Haploptychius bachmaensis Bui & Do D.S., 2019
- Haploptychius blaisei (Dautzenberg & Fischer, 1905)
- Haploptychius bourguignati (Mabille, 1887)
- Haploptychius burmanicus (Blanford, 1864)
- Haploptychius celebicus (P. Sarasin & F. Sarasin, 1899)
- Haploptychius costulatus (Möllendorff, 1881)
- Haploptychius deflexus (Souleyet, 1852)
- Haploptychius diespiter (Mabille, 1887)
- Haploptychius dorri (Dautzenberg, 1893)
- Haploptychius fagoti (Mabille, 1887)
- Haploptychius fischeri (Morlet, 1887)
- Haploptychius juedelli Yen, 1939
- Haploptychius juttingae van Bruggen, 1972
- Haploptychius nautilus (P. Sarasin & F. Sarasin, 1899)
- Haploptychius occidentalis (Heude, 1885)
- Haploptychius pachychilus (Möllendorff, 1884)
- Haploptychius pellucens (Pfeiffer, 1863)
- Haploptychius perlissus Vermeulen, Luu, Theary & Anker, 2019
- Haploptychius pfeifferi (Zelebor, 1867)
- Haploptychius porrectus (Pfeiffer, 1863)
- Haploptychius sahyadriensis (Bhosale, Thackeray and Yadav, 2022)
- Haploptychius sinensis (Gould, 1859)
- Haploptychius sinuosa (L. Pfeiffer, 1861)
