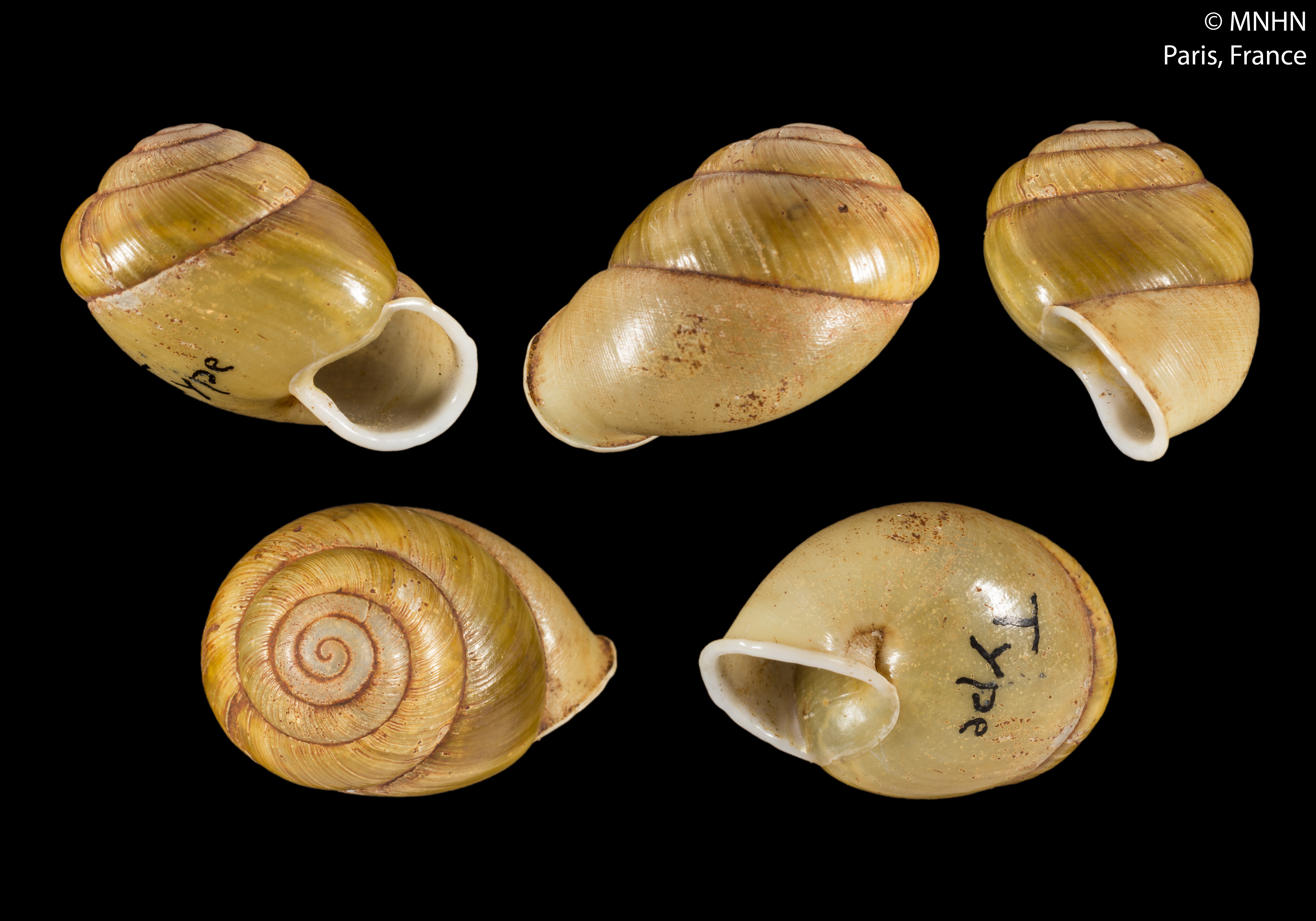
- Shell of Gonaxis lamottei (holotype at MNHN, Paris)

Scientific classification
- Domain: Eukaryota
- Kingdom: Animalia
- Phylum: Mollusca
- Class: Gastropoda
- Order: Stylommatophora
- Superfamily: Streptaxoidea
- Family: Streptaxidae
- Genus: Gonaxis; Taylor, 1877

Type species
- Gonaxis gibbonsi Taylor, 1877

Synonyms
- Edentulina (Marconia) Bourguignat, 1890 (superseded combination); Gonaxis (Gonaxis) J. W. Taylor, 1877· accepted, alternate representation; Gonaxis (Marconia) Bourguignat, 1890 (junior synonym); Gonaxis (Stenomarconia) Germain, 1934· accepted, alternate representation; Marconia Bourguignat, 1890 (junior synonym); Marconia (Stenomarconia) Germain, 1934 (original combination); Stenomarconia Germain, 1934

= Gonaxis =

Genus of gastropods

Gonaxis is a genus of air-breathing land snails, terrestrial pulmonate gastropod mollusks in the family Streptaxidae.

== Distribution ==
Distribution of the genus Gonaxis include Equatorial Africa and South Africa:

- South Africa
- Tanzania
- Uganda (2 species)
- * Comores

== Species ==
Species within the genus Gonaxis include:

- Gonaxis abessinicus (Thiele, 1933)
- Gonaxis aethiopicus (Thiele, 1933)
- Gonaxis albidus (L. Pfeiffer, 1845)
- Gonaxis benthencourti (Nobre, 1905)
- Gonaxis blacklocki Connolly, 1928
- Gonaxis bottegoi (E. von Martens, 1895)
- Gonaxis breviculus (E. A. Smith, 1890)
- Gonaxis camerunensis (D'Ailly, 1896)
- Gonaxis costata Verdcourt, 1963 †
- Gonaxis cressyi Connolly, 1922
- Gonaxis cylindricus (K. L. Pfeiffer, 1952)
- Gonaxis denticulatus (Dohrn, 1878)
- Gonaxis elegans (Pickford, 2009) †
- Gonaxis elgonensis (Preston, 1913)
- Gonaxis gibbonsi Taylor, 1877
- Gonaxis gibbosus (Bourguignat, 1890)
- Gonaxis innocens (Preston, 1913)
- Gonaxis jeanneli (Germain, 1934)
- Gonaxis johnstoni (E. A. Smith, 1899)
- Gonaxis kivuensis (Preston, 1913)
- Gonaxis kizinga (Tattersfield, 1999)
- Gonaxis lata (E. A. Smith, 1880)
- Gonaxis latula (Martens, 1895)
- Gonaxis mamboiensis (E. A. Smith, 1890)
- Gonaxis margarita (Preston, 1913)
- Gonaxis masabana (Connolly, 1930)
- Gonaxis maugerae (J. E. Gray, 1837)
- Gonaxis micans (Putzeys, 1899)
- Gonaxis microstriatus (Preston, 1912)
- Gonaxis miocraveni Pickford, 2009 †
- Gonaxis montisnimbae Binder, 1960
- Gonaxis monrovia (Rang, 1831)
- Gonaxis mozambicensis (E. A. Smith, 1880)
- Gonaxis mzinga (Tattersfield, 1999)
- Gonaxis pileolus Connolly, 1928
- Gonaxis prostratus (L. Pfeiffer, 1856)
- Gonaxis pseudotmesis Connolly, 1942
- Gonaxis pupilla (Morelet, 1888)
- Gonaxis recta (Bourguignat, 1890)
- Gonaxis schweitzeri (Dohrn, 1878)
- Gonaxis sudanicus (Preston, 1914)
- Gonaxis translucidus (Dupuis & Putzeys, 1901)
- Gonaxis turbinatus (Morelet, 1867)
- Gonaxis usambarensis Verdcourt, 1961
- Gonaxis vitreus (Morelet, 1867)
- Gonaxis vulcani (Thiele, 1911)
- Gonaxis welwitschi (Morelet, 1867)

Species brought into synonymy

- Gonaxis quadrilateralis Preston, 1910 / Gonaxis (Macrogonaxis) quadrilateralis (Preston, 1910) / Macrogonaxis quadrilateralis: synonym of Tayloria quadrilateralis (Preston, 1910) (superseded combination)
- Gonaxis vosseleri Thiele: synonym of Afristreptaxis vosseleri (Thiele, 1911) (superseded combination)
