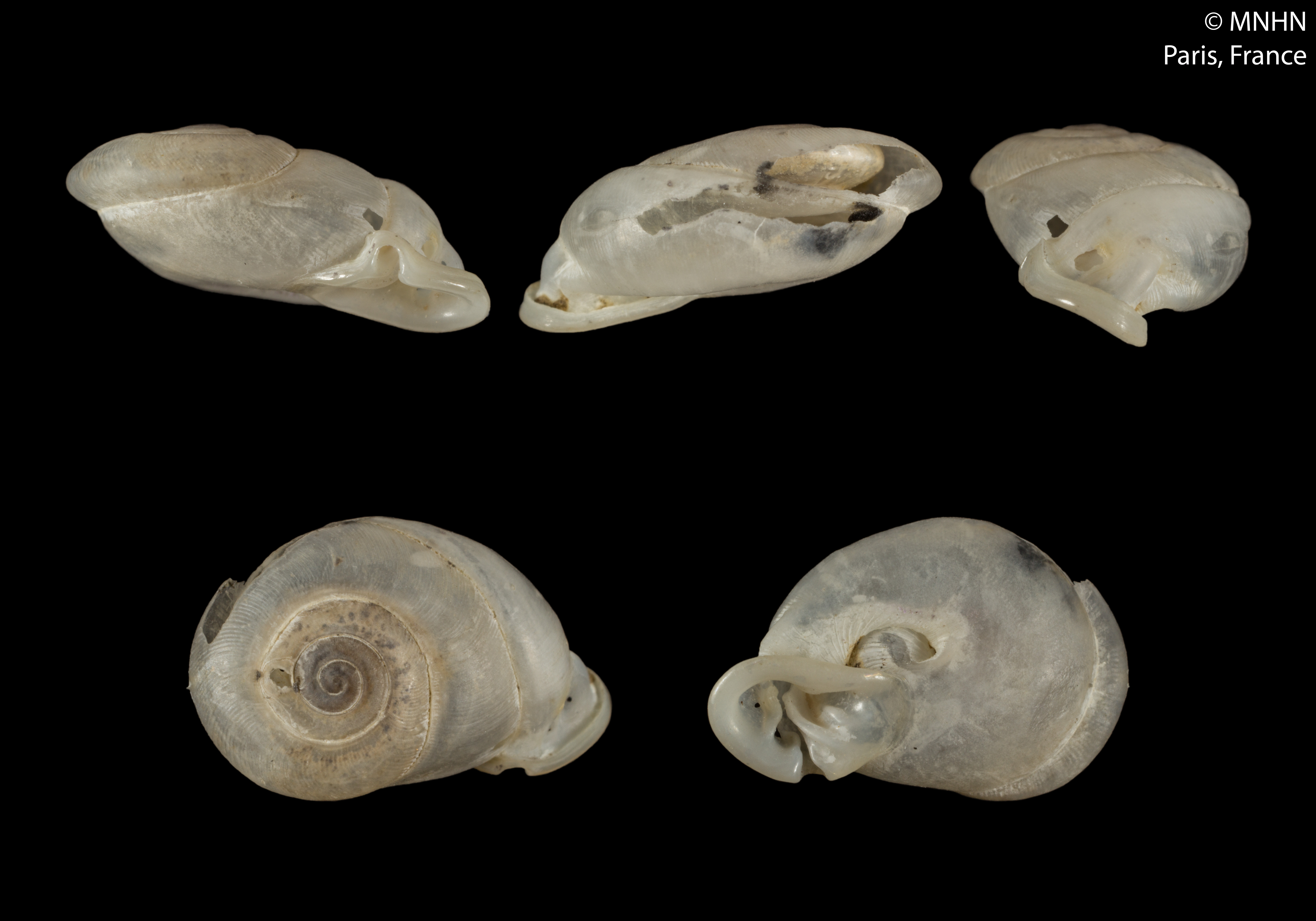
- Shell of Thachia ninhhoaensis (holotype at MNHN, Paris)

Scientific classification
- Domain: Eukaryota
- Kingdom: Animalia
- Phylum: Mollusca
- Class: Gastropoda
- Order: Stylommatophora
- Superfamily: Streptaxoidea
- Family: Streptaxidae
- Genus: Thachia; F. Huber, 2018

= Thachia =

Genus of gastropods

Thachia is a genus of air-breathing land snails, terrestrial pulmonate gastropod mollusks in the family Streptaxidae.

== Species ==
- Thachia ninhhoaensis F. Huber, 2018
