= Gonidomus newtoni =

Conservation status
- Extinct (IUCN 2.3)

Scientific classification
- Kingdom: Animalia
- Phylum: Mollusca
- Class: Gastropoda
- Order: Stylommatophora
- Family: Streptaxidae
- Genus: Gonidomus
- Species: †G. newtoni

Binomial name
- †Gonidomus newtoni Adams, 1867

Extinct species of gastropod

Gonidomus newtoni is an extinct species of air-breathing land snail, a terrestrial pulmonate gastropod mollusc in the family Streptaxidae.

This species was endemic to Mauritius. It is now extinct.
