= Martinella =

Martinella may refer to:

- Martinella (gastropod), a genus of molluscs in the family Streptaxidae
- Martinella (plant), a genus of plants in the family Bignoniaceae
- Martinella (grape), an Italian white wine grape
- Martinella, a bell used by the Florentines to ring out military signals, carried on a wagon called a carroccio
