= Campolaemus perexilis =

Conservation status
- Extinct (IUCN 2.3)

Scientific classification
- Kingdom: Animalia
- Phylum: Mollusca
- Class: Gastropoda
- Order: Stylommatophora
- Family: Streptaxidae
- Genus: Campolaemus
- Species: †C. perexilis

Binomial name
- †Campolaemus perexilis E. A. Smith, 1892

Species of gastropod

Campolaemus perexilis was a species of very small, air-breathing land snail, a terrestrial pulmonate gastropod mollusk in the family Vertiginidae, the whorls snails. This species was endemic to the island of Saint Helena; it is now extinct.
