= Rectartemon =

Scientific classification
- Domain: Eukaryota
- Kingdom: Animalia
- Phylum: Mollusca
- Class: Gastropoda
- Order: Stylommatophora
- Family: Streptaxidae
- Genus: Rectartemon; Baker, 1925

Genus of gastropods

Rectartemon is a genus of air-breathing land snails, terrestrial pulmonate gastropod mollusks in the family Streptaxidae.

== Distribution ==
The distribution of the genus Rectartemon includes:

- Brazil
- Venezuela
- Caribbean Islands

== Species ==
Species within the genus Rectartemon include:

- Rectartemon apertus (Martens, 1868)
- Rectartemon candidus (Spix, 1827)
- Rectartemon cappilosus (Pilsbry, 1897)
- Rectartemon cryptodon (Moricand, 1851)
- Rectartemon depressus (Heynemann, 1868)
- Rectartemon helios (Pilsbry, 1897)
- Rectartemon hylephilus (d’Orbigny, 1835)
- Rectartemon intermedius (Albers, 1857)
- Rectartemon mulleri (Thiele, 1927)
- Rectartemon politus (Fulton, 1899)
- Rectartemon rollandi (Bernardi, 1857)
- Rectartemon spixianus (Pfeiffer, 1841)
- Rectartemon wagneri (Pfeiffer, 1841)
