= Mirellia =

Scientific classification
- Kingdom: Animalia
- Phylum: Mollusca
- Class: Gastropoda
- Order: Stylommatophora
- Family: Streptaxidae
- Genus: Mirellia; Thiele, 1933

Genus of gastropods

Mirellia is a genus of air-breathing land snails, terrestrial pulmonate gastropod mollusks in the family Streptaxidae.

== Distribution ==
The distribution of the genus Mirellia includes:

- East Africa

== Species ==
Species within the genus Mirellia include:

- Mirellia bicarinata
- Mirellia prodigiosa
