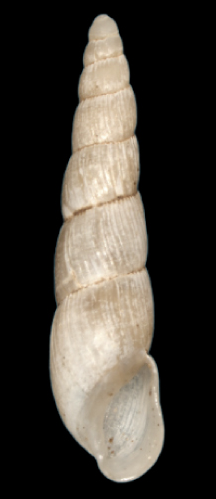
- A shell of Tomostele musaecola. The height of the shell is 8.71 mm.

Scientific classification
- Domain: Eukaryota
- Kingdom: Animalia
- Phylum: Mollusca
- Class: Gastropoda
- Order: Stylommatophora
- Family: Streptaxidae
- Genus: Tomostele
- Species: T. musaecola

Binomial name
- Tomostele musaecola (Morelet, 1860)

Synonyms
- Achatina musaecola Morelet, 1860 (original combination); Leptinaria (Luntia) insignis (E. A. Smith, 1898) (junior synonym); Luntia insignis (E. A. Smith, 1898); Streptostele (Tomostele) musaecola (Morelet, 1860); Streptostele insignis (E. A. Smith, 1898) (junior synonym); Streptostele musaecola (Morelet, 1860) ·

= Tomostele musaecola =

Species of gastropod

Tomostele musaecola is a species of small air-breathing land snail, terrestrial pulmonate gastropod mollusc in the family Streptaxidae.

== Distribution ==
The indigenous distribution of Tomostele musaecola includes:

- West Africa

This West African species has been widely reported from the Neotropics as Luntia insignis (E. A. Smith, 1898).

The non-indigenous distribution of Tomostele musaecola includes:

- Australia
- Melanesia and Polynesia
- throughout the Caribbean Basin. It was reported as Streptostele musaecola from various Caribbean localities by Hausdorf & Medina Bermúdez (2003).
- Dominica - introduced. First reported in 2009.

== Ecology ==
This species is molluscivorous (it eats other mollusks), and its effect on the native malacofauna of Dominica is as yet undocumented.
