= Sairostoma =

Scientific classification
- Kingdom: Animalia
- Phylum: Mollusca
- Class: Gastropoda
- Order: Stylommatophora
- Family: Streptaxidae
- Genus: Sairostoma; Haas, 1938

Genus of gastropods

Sairostoma is a genus of air-breathing land snails, terrestrial pulmonate gastropod mollusks in the family Streptaxidae.

== Distribution ==
The distribution of the genus Sairostoma includes:

- north-east Brazil

== Description ==
The anatomy of Sairostoma is currently unknown.

== Species ==
Species within the genus Sairostoma include:

- Sairostoma perplexum Haas, 1938
