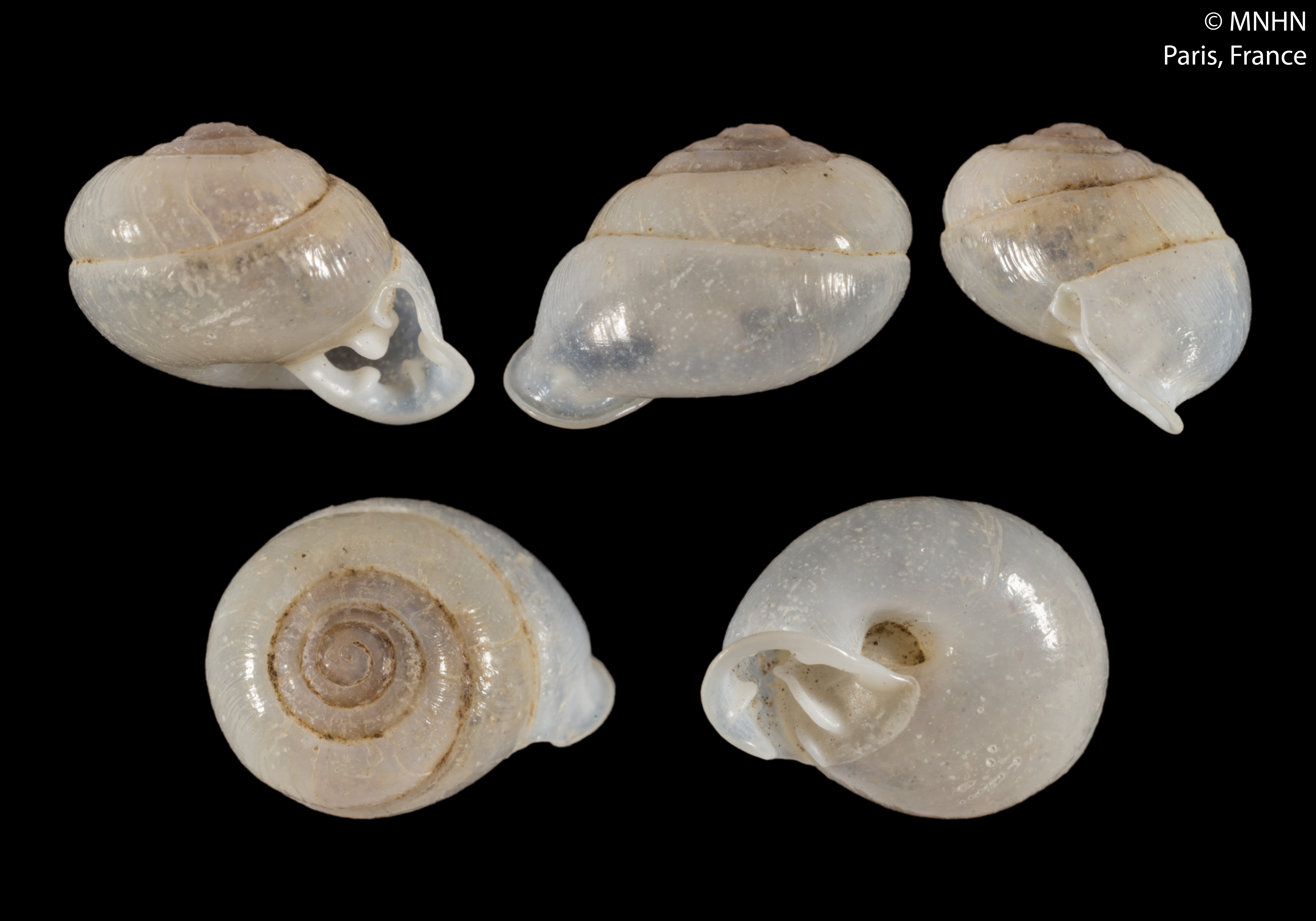
- Shell of Odontartemon dejectus (syntype at MNHN, Paris)

Scientific classification
- Kingdom: Animalia
- Phylum: Mollusca
- Class: Gastropoda
- Order: Stylommatophora
- Family: Streptaxidae
- Genus: Odontartemon; L. Pfeiffer, 1856

Type species
- Helix dejecta Moricand, 1836

Synonyms
- Streptaxis (Odontartemon) L. Pfeiffer, 1856· accepted, alternate representation

= Odontartemon =

Genus of gastropods

Odontartemon is a genus of air-breathing land snails, terrestrial pulmonate gastropod mollusks in the subfamily Streptaxinae of the family Streptaxidae.

== Distribution ==
The distribution of the genus Odontartemon includes:

- West Africa
- South America (Brazil)

== Species ==
Species within the genus Odontartemon include:

- Odontartemon bidens (Möllendorff, 1883)
- Odontartemon dejectus (Moricand, 1836)
- Odontartemon paulus (Gude, 1896)
- Odontartemon schomburgi Yen, 1939

Species brought into synonymy

- Odontartemon balingensis Tomlin, 1948: synonym of Oophana balingensis (Tomlin, 1948) (original combination)
- Odontartemon fuchsianus (Gredler, 1881): synonym of Indoartemon fuchsianus (Gredler, 1881) (unaccepted combination)
