= Campolaemus =

Scientific classification
- Kingdom: Animalia
- Phylum: Mollusca
- Class: Gastropoda
- Order: Stylommatophora
- Family: Streptaxidae
- Genus: Campolaemus; Pilsbry, 1892

Genus of gastropods

Campolaemus is a genus of very small, air-breathing land snails, terrestrial pulmonate gastropod mollusks in the family Streptaxidae.

== Species ==
The genus Campolaemus includes the following species:

- Campolaemus perexilis Smith, 1892, the type species
