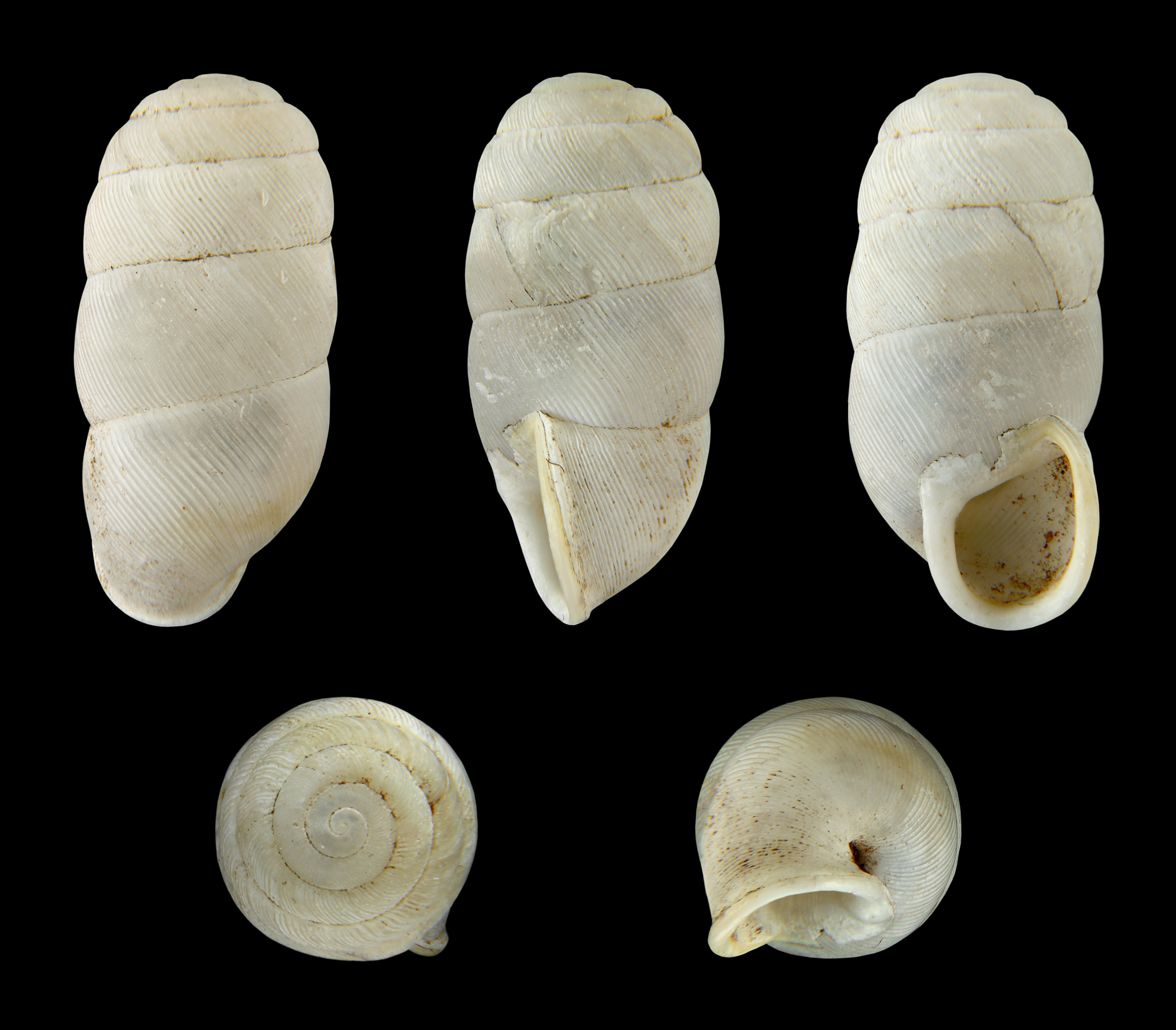
- Gibbulinella dealbata (Webb & Berthelot, 1833)

Scientific classification
- Kingdom: Animalia
- Phylum: Mollusca
- Class: Gastropoda
- Order: Stylommatophora
- Family: Streptaxidae
- Genus: Gibbulinella; Wenz, 1920

= Gibbulinella =

Genus of gastropods

Gibbulinella is a genus of air-breathing land snails, terrestrial pulmonate gastropod mollusks in the family Streptaxidae.

== Distribution ==
The distribution of the genus Gibbulinella includes:

- the Canary Islands

== Species ==
Species within the genus Gibbulinella include

- Gibbulinella dealbata (Webb & Berthelot, 1833)
- † Gibbulinella dewinteri Bank, Groh & Ripken, 2002
- Gibbulinella macrogira (Mousson, 1872)
- † Gibbulinella sandbergeri Harzhauser & Neubauer, 2021
