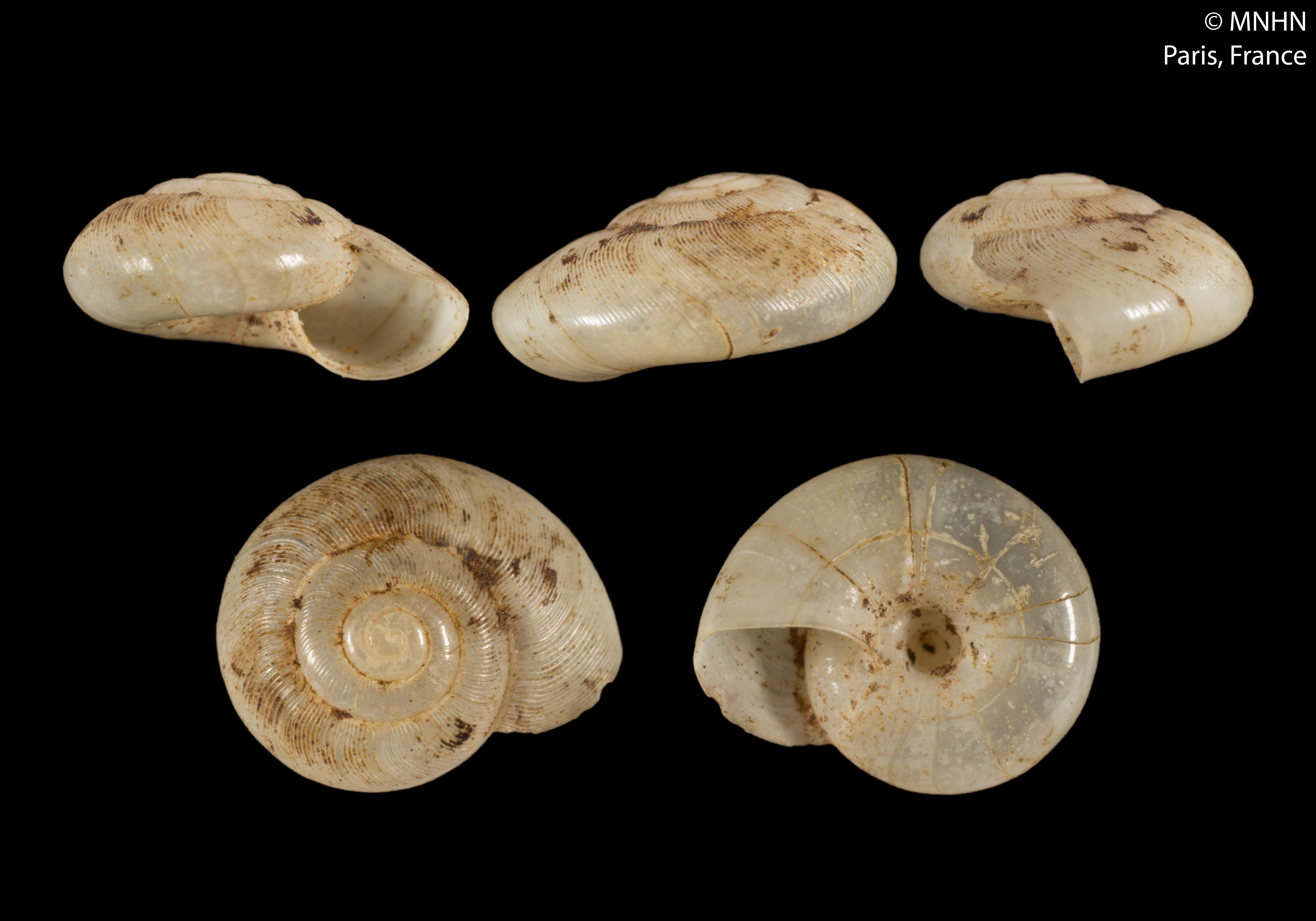
- Shell of Artemonopsis chevalieri (syntype at MNHN, Paris)

Scientific classification
- Kingdom: Animalia
- Phylum: Mollusca
- Class: Gastropoda
- Order: Stylommatophora
- Family: Streptaxidae
- Genus: Artemonopsis; Germain, 1908

Type species
- Streptaxis (Artemonopsis) chevalieri Germain, 1908

= Artemonopsis =

Genus of gastropods

Artemonopsis is a genus of air-breathing land snails, terrestrial pulmonate gastropod mollusks in the family Streptaxidae.

== Distribution ==
The distribution of the genus Artemonopsis includes:

- Ivory Coast

== Description ==
The internal anatomy of this genus is not known.

== Species ==
Species within the genus Artemonopsis include:

- Artemonopsis chevalieri (Germain, 1908)
