= Seychellaxis =

Conservation status
- Least Concern (IUCN 3.1)

Scientific classification
- Kingdom: Animalia
- Phylum: Mollusca
- Class: Gastropoda
- Order: Stylommatophora
- Superfamily: Streptaxoidea
- Family: Streptaxidae
- Subfamily: Orthogibbinae
- Genus: Seychellaxis; Schileyko, 2000
- Species: S. souleyetianus

Binomial name
- Seychellaxis souleyetianus (Petit, 1841)

Genus of gastropods

Seychellaxis is a genus of air-breathing land snails, terrestrial pulmonate gastropod mollusks in the family Streptaxidae. It contains only Seychellaxis souleyetianus.

== Distribution ==
The genus is found only in the Seychelles.

== Species ==
The genus Seychellaxis include only one species:

- Seychellaxis souleyetianus (Petit de la Saussaye, 1841) Synonyms were Gonaxis souleyetianus (Petit, 1841) and Streptaxis souleyetianus (Petit, 1841).
