= Micrartemon =

Scientific classification
- Kingdom: Animalia
- Phylum: Mollusca
- Class: Gastropoda
- Order: Stylommatophora
- Family: Streptaxidae
- Genus: Micrartemon; Möllendorff, 1890

Genus of gastropods

Micrartemon is a genus of air-breathing land snails, terrestrial pulmonate gastropod carnivorous mollusks in the family Streptaxidae.

== Description ==
Its shell is small and elongated, often adapted for navigating leaf litter and soil habitats.

== Distribution ==
The distribution of the genus Micrartemon is endemic to the Philippines in the island of Cebu.

== Species ==
Species within the genus Micrartemon include:

- Micrartemon boettgeri Möllendorff, 1890

The species was named after Oskar Boettger, a German zoologist.
