= Conturbatia =

Conservation status
- Critically endangered, possibly extinct (IUCN 3.1)

Scientific classification
- Kingdom: Animalia
- Phylum: Mollusca
- Class: Gastropoda
- Order: Stylommatophora
- Family: Streptaxidae
- Genus: Conturbatia; Gerlach, 2001
- Species: C. crenata

Binomial name
- Conturbatia crenata Gerlach, 2001

Species of gastropod

Conturbatia is a genus of air-breathing land snail in the family Streptaxidae. It is monotypic, being represented by the single species Conturbatia crenata in the family Streptaxidae. It is a species of air-breathing land snail, a terrestrial pulmonate gastropod mollusk.

Conturbatia crenata is possibly extinct. The last record of this species alive was in 2000. It is thought, that the population of Conturbatia crenata has been poisoned with rodenticide Brodifacoum in 2000. But the investigation from 2011 to 2021 showed that Conturbatia crenata still exists on Frégate Island.

== Distribution ==
Conturbatia crenata is endemic to the Frégate Island in the Seychelles.

== Description ==
Conturbatia crenata has reduced radula.

== Ecology ==
Conturbatia crenata lives in woodland areas with Pterocarpus indicus, also known as the New Guinea Rosewood tree. It inhabits leaf litter and habitats with dead wood.

Conturbatia crenata feeds on carrion.
