= Acanthennea =

Conservation status
- Vulnerable (IUCN 3.1)

Scientific classification
- Kingdom: Animalia
- Phylum: Mollusca
- Class: Gastropoda
- Order: Stylommatophora
- Family: Streptaxidae
- Subfamily: Orthogibbinae
- Genus: Acanthennea; Martens, 1898
- Species: A. erinacea

Binomial name
- Acanthennea erinacea (Martens, 1898)

Synonyms
- Ennea (Acanthennea) erinaceus Martens, 1898

Genus of gastropods

Acanthennea erinacea is a species of air-breathing land snail, terrestrial pulmonate gastropod mollusc in the family Streptaxidae.

Acanthennea erinacea is the only species within the genus Acanthennea.

== Distribution ==
Acanthennea erinacea is endemic to Silhouette Island and Mahé Island, the Seychelles.
