= Martinella (gastropod) =

Scientific classification
- Kingdom: Animalia
- Phylum: Mollusca
- Class: Gastropoda
- Order: Stylommatophora
- Suborder: Scolodontina
- Family: Scolodontidae
- Genus: Martinella; Jousseaume, 1887

Type species
- Martinella martinella Jousseaume, 1887

Genus of gastropods

Martinella is a genus of air-breathing land snails, terrestrial pulmonate gastropod mollusks in the family Streptaxidae.

== Distribution ==
The distribution of the genus Martinella includes:

- Ecuador
- south Brazil

== Species ==
Species within the genus Martinella include:

- Martinella martinella Jousseaume, 1887

Synonyms

- Martinella prisca Thiele, 1927: synonym of Keranella prisca (Thiele, 1927) (superseded combination)
