= Alfred James Peile =

British ornithologist and malacologist

- Born: 5 August 1868; London, England
- Died: 30 July 1948 (aged 79); London, England
- Citizenship: British
- Spouse: Marion Macdonald Peterson (m. 1894)
- Scientific career
- Fields: malacology

Alfred James Peile (5 August 1868 – 13 July 1948) was a British army officer and an amateur malacologist who was an expert on the radulae of gastropods.

== Life ==
Peile was educated at Cheltenham College and trained at the Royal Military Academy, Woolwich. He was commissioned into the Royal Garrison Artillery as a second lieutenant on 17 February 1888, promoted to lieutenant on 17 February 1891, and to captain on 18 April 1898. During his military career he served in India, Bermuda and South Africa, before joining the School of Gunnery, Shoeburyness, where he became an instructor in February 1903. He later served in France during the First World War. Following retirement from the army with the rank of lieutenant colonel in 1920, Peile was an honorary curator at the Department of Mollusca at the Natural History Museum in London, and published over fifty malacological papers. He was also President of the Malacological Society of London 1925–1927, and of the Conchological Society 1935–1937.
