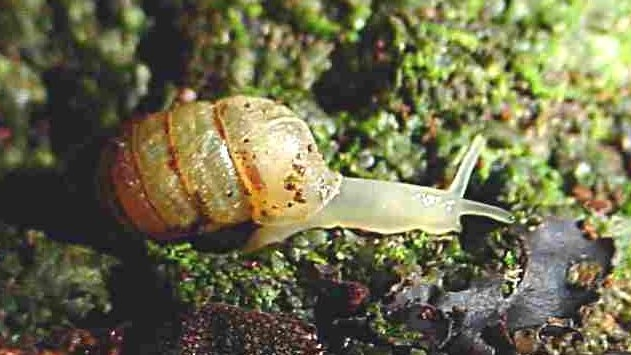
- Gonospira uvula

Scientific classification
- Kingdom: Animalia
- Phylum: Mollusca
- Class: Gastropoda
- Order: Stylommatophora
- Superfamily: Streptaxoidea
- Family: Streptaxidae; Gray, 1860

Subfamilies
- Enneinae Bourguignat, 1883; Gulellinae Rowson, 2024; Marconiinae Schileyko, 2000; Primigulellinae Rowson, 2024 Odontartemoninae Schileyko, 2000; Orthogibbinae Germain, 1921; Streptaxinae Gray, 1860

Diversity
- About 1000 species, about 60 genera

= Streptaxidae =

Family of gastropods

Streptaxidae is a family of carnivorous air-breathing land snails, terrestrial pulmonate gastropod mollusks in the clade Stylommatophora.

Streptaxidae are monophyletic while all subfamilies and several genera are polyphyletic.

Six Streptaxidae subfamilies are accepted in the 2005 taxonomy of the Gastropoda by Bouchet & Rocroi.

Streptaxidae are carnivorous except for one species Edentulina moreleti, which is herbivorous. All streptaxids have well-developed radula, except Careoradula perelegans, which is the only known terrestrial gastropod without radula.

Altogether 66 species from the family Streptaxidae are listed in the 2010 IUCN Red List.

== Distribution ==
The historical area of origin of the Streptaxidae is probably Gondwanaland.

The family is widely distributed across the tropical and subtropical areas of South America, Africa and Asia. The Recent native distribution of Streptaxidae includes South America, Africa, Arabia, Madagascar, Seychelles, Mayotte, Comores, Mauritius, Réunion, Rodrigues, India, Sri Lanka, Andamans, South-East Asia and the Philippines. The genus Gibbulinella is found in the Canary Islands.

The species diversity of Streptaxidae reaches its maximum in sub-Saharan Africa.

With 13 genera and about 130 nominal species, the second most diverse streptaxid fauna can be found in Southeast Asia. Streptaxidae are the most diverse among tropical Asian carnivorous snails. In Indochina, streptaxid diversity was thought to comprise only 10 genera and about 40 species in 1967. However, in 2006–2016, 21 new species (more than half the previous total) and one new genus had been described from Indochina. Thirty-seven species are recorded from Thailand, 10 from Myanmar, 45 from Vietnam, and 12 from Laos.

== Description ==
Streptaxids can generally be recognized by their eccentric or cylindrical shells, while the animals have a bright yellow to red or orange body with external hook-like structures on the everted penis.

Early classifications of the family such as Wilhelm Kobelt (1905–6), used mainly shell shape and the arrangement of apertural dentition. However, many shell characters are highly conserved or occur recurrently, making some species and genera difficult to separate. The reproductive organs of streptaxids can also be taxonomically significant.

== Taxonomy ==
Prior to Schileyko's revision in 2000 only two subfamilies, the Streptaxinae and the Enneinae had been recognized, which were primarily based on their shell morphology.

=== 2005 taxonomy ===
Only the one family, Streptaxidae, was recognized within the Streptaxoidea in the taxonomy of Bouchet & Rocroi (2005).

There are 7 subfamilies in the family Streptaxidae according to the taxonomy of the Gastropoda by Bouchet & Rocroi, 2005, that follows Schileyko (2000):

- Enneinae Bourguignat, 1883 - synonym: Streptostelidae Bourguignat, 1889
- Gulellinae Rowson, 2024
- Marconiinae Schileyko, 2000
- Odontartemoninae Schileyko, 2000
- Orthogibbinae Germain, 1921 - synonyms: Gibbinae Steenberg, 1936; Gonidominae Steenberg, 1936
- Primigulellinae Rowson, 2024
- Streptaxinae Gray, 1860 - synonym: Artemonidae Bourguignat, 1889

Synonyms

- Ptychotrematinae Pilsbry, 1919: synonym of Enneinae Bourguignat, 1883

=== 2010 taxonomy ===
Sutcharit et al. (2010) have established a new family Diapheridae within Streptaxoidea and they have added two genera Diaphera and Sinoennea into Diapheridae.

The later review "A review of the Diapheridae" in 2020 by Páll-Gergely, B., Hunyadi, A., Grego, J., Sajan, S., Tripathy, B. & Chen, Z.-Y. showed the family Diapheridae to stand separate from Streptaxidae.

In the recent decades, most of the taxonomic and systematic research on streptaxids has been performed on sub-Saharan African taxa. Only a few publications focus on South American or Asian groups.

== Genera ==
Genera in the family Streptaxidae include:

=== Enneinae ===
- Avakubia Pilsbry, 1919
- Costigulella Pilsbry, 1919
- Digulella F. Haas, 1934
- Mirigulella Pilsbry & Cockerell, 1933
- Paucidentella Thiele, 1933
- Pseudavakubia de Winter & Vastenhout, 2013
- Ptychotrema L. Pfeiffer, 1853
- Pupigulella Pilsbry, 1919
- Rhabdogulella F. Haas, 1934
- Silvigulella Pilsbry, 1919
- Sphincterocochlion Verdcourt, 1985
- Sphinctostrema Girard, 1894
- Streptostele Dohrn, 1866
- Tomostele Ancey, 1885

=== Gulellinae ===
- Austromarconia van Bruggen & de Winter, 2003
- Dadagulella Rowson & Tattersfield, 2013 (Note: Dadagulella is placed here, because Dadagulella and Gulella are supposed to be sister groups.)
- Gulella Pfeiffer, 1856[2]
- Pseudelma Kobelt, 1904

=== Marconiinae ===
- Gonaxis J. W. Taylor, 1877

=== Odontartemoninae ===
- Artemonopsis Germain, 1908
- Lamelliger Ancey, 1884
- Pseudogonaxis Thiele, 1932
- Tanzartemon Tattersfield & Rowson, 2011
- Tayloria Bourguignat, 1889

=== Orthogibbinae ===
- Acanthennea Martens, 1898 - with the only species Acanthennea erinacea (Martens, 1898)
- Augustula Thiele, 1931 - with the only species Augustula braueri (Martens, 1898)
- Careoradula Gerlach & van Bruggen, 1999 - with the only species Careoradula perelegans (Martens, 1898)
- Conturbatia Gerlach, 2001 - with the only species Conturbatia crenata Gerlach, 2001
- Gerlachina Rowson, 2024
- Gibbulinella Wenz, 1920
- † Gibbus Montfort, 1810 - this genus was endemic to Mauritius and it is now extinct
- Glabrennea
- † Gonidomus Swainson, 1840 - this genus was endemic to Mauritius and it is now extinct
- Gonospira Swainson, 1840
- Imperturbatia Martens, 1898
- Orthogibbus Germain, 1919 - type genus of the subfamily
- Parvedentulina Emberton & Pearce, 2000 - endemic to Madagascar
- Plicadomus Swainson, 1840
- Priodiscus Martens, 1898
- Seychellaxis Schileyko, 2000 - with the only species Seychellaxis souleyetianus (Petit, 1841)
- Silhouettia Gerlach & van Bruggen, 1999 - with the only species Silhouettia silhouettae (Martens, 1898)
- Stereostele Pilsbry, 1919 - with the only species Stereostele nevilli (Adams, 1868)

=== Primigulellinae ===
- Aenigmigulella Pilsbry & Cockerell, 1933
- Juventigulella Tattersfield, 1998
- Microstrophia Möllendorff, 1887
- Mirellia Thiele, 1933
- Primigulella Pilsbry, 1919

=== Streptaxinae ===
- Afristreptaxis Thiele, 1932
- Carinartemis Siriboon & Panha, 2014
- Discartemon Pfeiffer, 1856
- Edentulina L. Pfeiffer, 1856
- Elma Adams, 1866
- Embertonina Rowson, 2024
- Fischerpietteus Emberton, 2003
- Glyptoconus Möllendorff, 1894
- Haploptychius Kobelt, 1905
- Hypselartemon Wenz, 1947
- Indoartemon Forcart, 1946
- Makrokonche Emberton, 1994
- Martinella Jousseaume, 1887
- Micrartemon Möllendorff, 1890
- Nagyelma Páll-Gergely & Hunyadi, 2021
- Odontartemon L. Pfeiffer, 1856
- Oophana Ancey, 1884
- Pallgergelyia Thach, 2017
- Perrottetia Kobelt, 1905
- † Protostreptaxis W. Yü & X.-Q. Zhang, 1982
- Rectartemon Baker, 1925
- Sairostoma Haas, 1938
- Stemmatopsis J. Mabille, 1887
- Streptartemon Kobelt, 1905
- Streptaxis Gray, 1837 - type genus of the family Streptaxidae
- Thachia F. Huber, 2018

=== Unsorted to subfamily ===
- Campolaemus Pilsbry, 1892
- † Goniodomulus Harzhauser & Neubauer in Harzhauser et al., 2016
- Pallgergelyia Thach, 2017
- Panhartemis Siriboon, 2023
- † Pfefferiola Harzhauser & Neubauer, 2021

Notes

- Scolodonta Doering, 1875 used to be classified within Streptaxinae, but Scolodonta is the type genus of the family Scolodontidae.

== Synonyms ==
- Subfamily Gibbinae Steenberg, 1936: synonym of Orthogibbinae Germain, 1921
- Subfamily Gonidominae Steenberg, 1936: synonym of Orthogibbinae Germain, 1921
- Subfamily Ptychotrematinae Pilsbry, 1919: synonym of Enneinae Bourguignat, 1883
- Aberdaria Blume, 1965: synonym of Primigulella Pilsbry, 1919 (junior synonym)
- Acanthenna: synonym of Acanthennea E. von Martens, 1898 (misspelling)
- Adjua Chaper, 1885: synonym of Ptychotrema (Adjua) Chaper, 1885 represented as Ptychotrema L. Pfeiffer, 1853 (original rank)
- Alcidia Bourguignat, 1890: synonym of Streptaxis Gray, 1837
- Artemon H. Beck, 1837: synonym of Streptaxis Gray, 1837
- Campylaxis Ancey, 1888: synonym of Streptostele Dohrn, 1866
- Carychiopsis E. von Martens, 1895: synonym of Ennea H. Adams & A. Adams, 1855: synonym of Ptychotrema (Ennea) H. Adams & A. Adams, 1855 represented as Ptychotrema L. Pfeiffer, 1853
- Colpanostoma Bourguignat, 1890: synonym of Tayloria (Tayloria) Bourguignat, 1890 represented as Tayloria Bourguignat, 1890 (junior synonym)
- Conogulella Pilsbry, 1919: synonym of Gulella (Conogulella) Pilsbry, 1919 represented as Gulella L. Pfeiffer, 1856
- Ennea H. Adams & A. Adams, 1855 - type genus of the subfamily : synonym of Ptychotrema (Ennea) H. Adams & A. Adams, 1855 represented as Ptychotrema L. Pfeiffer, 1853
- Enneastrum L. Pfeiffer, 1856: synonym of Ennea H. Adams & A. Adams, 1855: synonym of Ptychotrema (Ennea) H. Adams & A. Adams, 1855 represented as Ptychotrema L. Pfeiffer, 1853
- Eustreptaxis L. Pfeiffer, 1878: synonym of Streptaxis Gray, 1837 (objective junior synonym)
- Eustreptostele Germain, 1915: synonym of Streptostele (Tomostele) Ancey, 1885: synonym of Tomostele Ancey, 1885
- Gibbonsia Bourguignat, 1890: synonym of Gigantaxis Tomlin, 1930: synonym of Tayloria (Tayloria) Bourguignat, 1890 represented as Tayloria Bourguignat, 1890 (junior primary homonym of Gibbonsia Cooper, 1864)
- Gibbulina Beck, 1837: synonym of Gibbus Montfort, 1810 (invalid; unnecessary replacement name for Gibbus Monfort, 1810)
- Gigantaxis Tomlin, 1930: synonym of Tayloria (Tayloria) Bourguignat, 1890 represented as Tayloria Bourguignat, 1890
- Haplonepion Pilsbry, 1919: synonym of Ptychotrema (Haplonepion) Pilsbry, 1919 represented as Ptychotrema L. Pfeiffer, 1853
- Huttonella Pfeiffer, 1855: synonym of Gulella (Huttonella) L. Pfeiffer, 1856 represented as Gulella L. Pfeiffer, 1856
- Idolum L. Pfeiffer, 1856: synonym of Gonidomus Swainson, 1840 (junior synonym)
- Indoennea Kobelt, 1904: synonym of Sinoennea Kobelt, 1904 (junior synonym)
- Ischnostele C. R. Boettger, 1915: synonym of Streptostele (Raffraya) Bourguignat, 1883 represented as Streptostele Dohrn, 1866
- Luntia E.A. Smith, 1898: synonym of Streptostele (Tomostele) Ancey, 1885: synonym of Tomostele Ancey, 1885 (junior synonym)
- Marconia Bourguignat, 1889 - type genus of the subfamily: synonym of Gonaxis J. W. Taylor, 1877 (junior synonym)
- Macrogonaxis Bequaert & Clench, 1936: synonym of Tayloria (Macrogonaxis) Thiele, 1932 represented as Tayloria Bourguignat, 1890
- Marconia Bourguignat, 1890: synonym of Gonaxis J. W. Taylor, 1877 (junior synonym)
- Maurennea: synonym of Gulella (Maurennea) Schileyko, 2000 represented as Gulella L. Pfeiffer, 1856
- Nevillia E. von Martens, 1880: synonym of Microstrophia Möllendorff, 1887 (junior homonym of Nevillia H. Adams, 1868)
- † Oppenheimiella Pfeffer, 1930 : synonym of † Pfefferiola Harzhauser & Neubauer, 2021 (Invalid: junior homonym of Oppenheimiella Meunier, 1893 [Diptera]; Pfefferiola is a replacement name)
- Orthogibbus Germain, 1919: synonym of Gonospira Swainson, 1840
- Parennea Pilsbry, 1919: synonym of Ptychotrema (Parennea) Pilsbry, 1919 represented as Ptychotrema L. Pfeiffer, 1853
- Pseudartemon J. Mabille, 1887: synonym of Haploptychius Kobelt, 1905
- Raffraya Bourguignat, 1883: synonym of Streptostele (Raffraya) Bourguignat, 1883 represented as Streptostele Dohrn, 1866
- Sinistrexcisa de Winter, Gómez & Prieto, 1999: synonym of Ptychotrema L. Pfeiffer, 1853
- Somalitayloria Verdcourt, 1962: synonym of Tayloria (Somalitayloria) Verdcourt, 1962 represented as Tayloria Bourguignat, 1890
- Stenomarconia Germain, 1934: synonym of Gonaxis (Stenomarconia) Germain, 1934 represented as Gonaxis J. W. Taylor, 1877
- Thaumatogulella F. Haas, 1951: synonym of Mirellia Thiele, 1933
- Varicostele Pilsbry, 1919: synonym of Streptostele (Varicostele) Pilsbry, 1919 represented as Streptostele Dohrn, 1866
- Webbia Odhner, 1932: synonym of Gibbulinella Wenz, 1920

== See also ==
- taxa of Streptaxidae described by Adolph Cornelis van Bruggen
