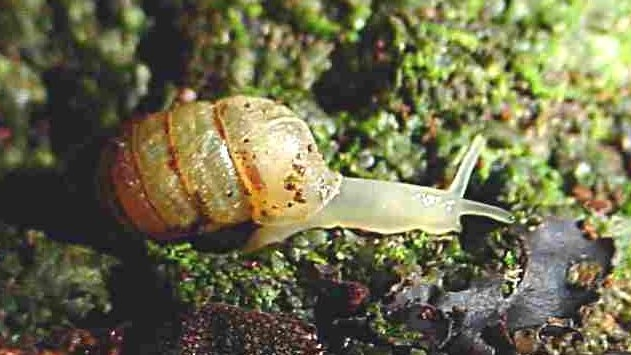
- Gonospira uvula (Streptaxidae)

Scientific classification
- Domain: Eukaryota
- Kingdom: Animalia
- Phylum: Mollusca
- Class: Gastropoda
- Subcohort: Panpulmonata
- Superorder: Eupulmonata
- Order: Stylommatophora
- Superfamily: Streptaxoidea; Gray, 1860

Diversity
- about 1000 species, about 60 genera

= Streptaxoidea =

Superfamily of gastropods

Streptaxoidea is a superfamily of air-breathing land snails, terrestrial pulmonate gastropod mollusks in the suborder Achatinina of the order Stylommatophora.

== Taxonomy ==
=== 2005 taxonomy ===
There have been recognized the only family Streptaxidae within Streptaxoidea in the taxonomy of Bouchet & Rocroi (2005).

=== 2010 taxonomy ===
Sutcharit et al. (2010) have established a new family Diapheridae within Streptaxoidea as follows:

- family Streptaxidae Gray, 1860
- family Diapheridae Panha & Naggs, 2010

Rowson et al. (2011) have confirmed monophyly of Streptaxidae and Diapheridae as its sister group.
