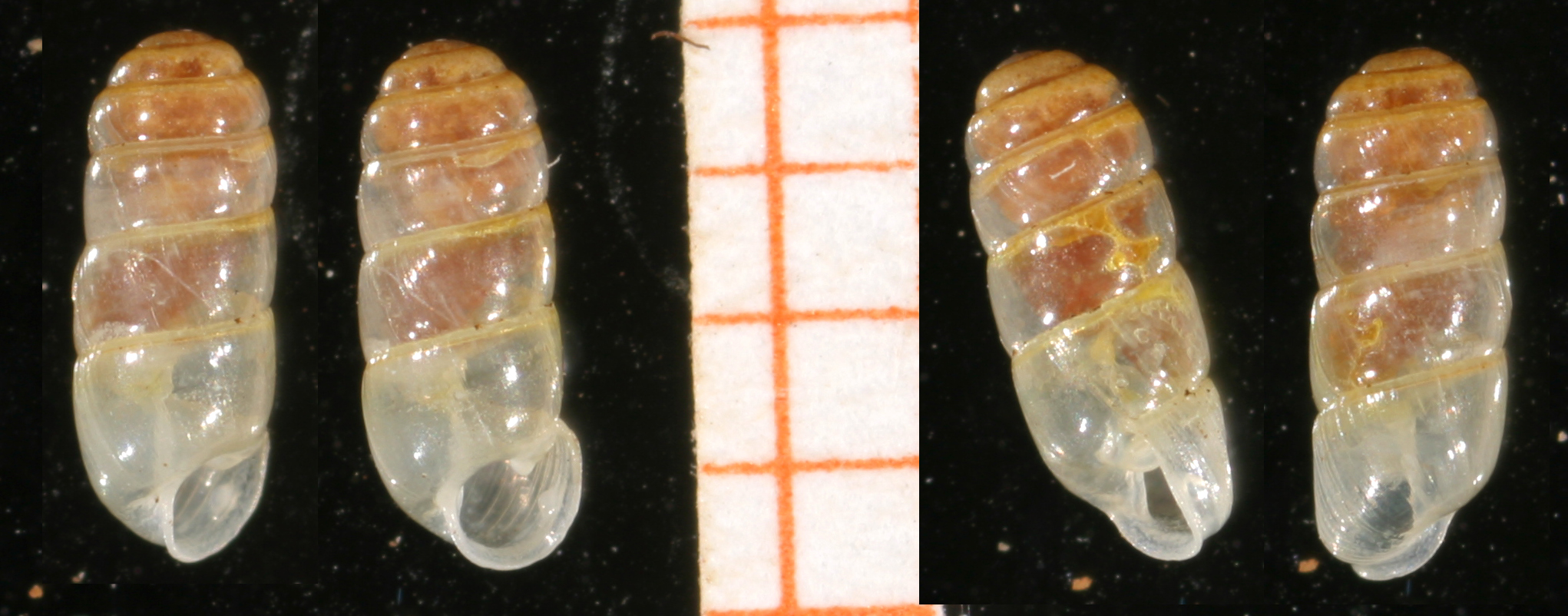
- Two different views of two shells of Gulella io

Scientific classification
- Kingdom: Animalia
- Phylum: Mollusca
- Class: Gastropoda
- Order: Stylommatophora
- Suborder: Achatinina
- Superfamily: Streptaxoidea
- Family: Streptaxidae
- Genus: Gulella; Pfeiffer, 1856

Type species
- Pupa menkeana L. Pfeiffer, 1853

Synonyms
- Diaphera (Huttonella) L. Pfeiffer, 1856 (superseded combination); Ennea (Gulella) L. Pfeiffer, 1856 (original rank); Ennea (Huttonella) L. Pfeiffer, 1856 (original combination); Ennea (Paucidentata) (spelling error); Ennea (Uniplicaria) L. Pfeiffer, 1856 (superseded combination); Gulella (Gulella) L. Pfeiffer, 1856· accepted, alternate representation; Gulella (Huttonella) L. Pfeiffer, 1856· accepted, alternate representation; Gulella (Maurennea) Schileyko, 2000· accepted, alternate representation; Gulella (Molarella) Connolly, 1922· accepted, alternate representation; Gulella (Paucidentina) E. von Martens, 1897· accepted, alternate representation; Gulella (Plicigulella) Pilsbry, 1919· accepted, alternate representation; Gulella (Tortigulella) Pilsbry, 1919· accepted, alternate representation; Gulella (Uniplicaria) E. von Martens, 1895 (preoccupied name); Gulella (Uniplicaria) L. Pfeiffer, 1856· accepted, alternate representation; Gulella (Wilmattina) Pilsbry & Cockerell, 1933· accepted, alternate representation; Gulella (Zulugulella) Rowson & Herbert, 2016· accepted, alternate representation; Huttonella L. Pfeiffer, 1856; Maurennea Schileyko, 2000; Ptychotrema (Wilmattina) Pilsbry & Cockerell, 1933 (original combination)

= Gulella =

Genus of gastropods

Gulella is a genus of very small air-breathing land snails, terrestrial pulmonate gastropod mollusks in the family Streptaxidae.

Until recently, species which are now in the genus Costigulella were included here.

== Distribution ==
Distribution of the genus Gulella include:

- Afrotropical: Uganda (20 species)
- Arabia
- Madagascar
- Comoros
- the Seychelles
- Mauritius

== Species ==
Species within the large genus Gulella include:

- Gulella aberdarensis Preston, 1913
- Gulella acutidens (O. Boettger, 1905)
- Gulella adami van Bruggen, 1994
- Gulella aequidentata (E. A. Smith, 1890)
- Gulella afrooccidentalis Verdcourt, 2004
- Gulella albersi (L. Pfeiffer, 1855)
- Gulella albinus van Bruggen & Van Goethem, 1999
- Gulella albogilva Germain, 1934
- Gulella aliciae (Melvill & Ponsonby, 1907)
- Gulella alleni Verdcourt, 1974
- Gulella alutacea Connolly, 1932
- Gulella amaniensis Verdcourt, 1953
- Gulella ambalaniranae Emberton, 2001
- Gulella ambanikelia Emberton, 2001
- Gulella ambodipelomosiae Emberton, 2002
- Gulella ambrensis Emberton, 2001
- Gulella amicta (E. A. Smith, 1890)
- Gulella analamerae Emberton, 2001
- Gulella andreana Fischer-Piette, Blanc, F. & Vukadinovic, 1974
- Gulella andriantanteliae
- Gulella ankaranaensis Fischer-Piette, Blanc, C.P., Blanc, F. & Salvat, 1994
- Gulella annibiodiversitatis van Bruggen, 2011
- Gulella antelmeana Peile, 1936
- Gulella antongilae Emberton, 2001
- Gulella appletoni van Bruggen, 1975
- Gulella aprosdoketa Connolly, 1939
- Gulella aranearum van Bruggen, 1986
- Gulella argoudi Griffiths, 2000
- Gulella arnoldi (Sturany, 1898)
- Gulella arthuri (Dautzenberg, 1890)
- Gulella atewana de Winter, 1996
- Gulella aversostriata Verdcourt, 1985
- Gulella azeitonae D. Holyoak & G. Holyoak, 2020
- Gulella baccata (Preston, 1913)
- Gulella bancoensis de Winter, 1996
- Gulella barbarae Connolly, 1929
- Gulella barnardi van Bruggen, 1965
- Gulella bassetti Burnup, 1925
- Gulella beandreana Emberton, 2001
- Gulella bebokae Emberton, 2001
- Gulella bemarahae Emberton, 2001
- Gulella bemoka Emberton, 2001
- Gulella benetecta Connolly, 1930
- Gulella benjamini Emberton & Pearce, 2000
- Gulella bernardi van Bruggen & Van Goethem, 1997
- Gulella betamponae Emberton, 2002
- Gulella bicolor (T. Hutton, 1834)
- Gulella bitzeense Connolly, 1922
- Gulella bobaombiae Emberton, 2001
- Gulella bolocoensis Ortiz de Zárate López & Ortiz de Zárate Rocandio, 1956
- Gulella bomolensis Verdcourt, 1953
- Gulella bomvana Cole & Herbert, 2009
- Gulella bondi Verdcourt, 1962
- Gulella bouchardi Fischer-Piette, Blanc, F. & Vukadinovic, 1974
- Gulella boucheti Fischer-Piette, Blanc, C.P., Blanc, F. & Salvat, 1994
- Gulella bowkerae (Melvill & Ponsonby, 1892)
- Gulella brevicula (Morelet, 1882)
- Gulella brevis (Thiele, 1911)
- Gulella bruggeni Cole & Herbert, 2009
- Gulella burnupi (Melvill & Ponsonby, 1897)
- Gulella burungaensis (Preston, 1913)
- Gulella bushmanensis Burnup, 1926
- Gulella cacosystata Germain, 1934
- Gulella cacuminata Ortiz de Zárate López & Ortiz de Zárate Rocandio, 1956
- Gulella cairnsi (Melvill & Ponsonby, 1897)
- Gulella callosa (Morelet, 1881)
- Gulella calopasa (Melvill & Ponsonby, 1903)
- Gulella camerani (Pollonera, 1906)
- Gulella cancellata Connolly, 1922
- Gulella candela Connolly, 1922
- Gulella candidula (Morelet, 1889)
- Gulella capmini Emberton, 2001
- Gulella cara Pilsbry, 1919
- Gulella carea (Preston, 1913)
- Gulella caroli (Kobelt, 1913)
- Gulella carpenteri Connolly, 1931
- Gulella caryatis (Melvill & Ponsonby, 1898)
- Gulella cavidens (E. von Martens, 1876)
- Gulella ceciliae van Bruggen, 1971
- Gulella celestinae Emberton, 2001
- Gulella cerea (Dunker, 1848)
- Gulella chapini Pilsbry, 1919
- Gulella cheranganiensis Germain, 1934
- Gulella chi Burnup, 1926
- Gulella claustralis Connolly, 1939
- Gulella claustrum (Preston, 1913)
- Gulella coarctata (D'Ailly, 1910)
- Gulella coarti (Dautzenberg & Germain, 1914)
- Gulella coeni (Preston, 1913)
- Gulella collicola van Bruggen, 1966
- Gulella columella (E. A. Smith, 1903)
- Gulella columna Emberton, 2001
- Gulella columnella (Melvill & Ponsonby, 1901)
- Gulella commoda (E. A. Smith, 1903)
- Gulella comorensis (E. von Martens, 1876)
- Gulella conicodentata K. L. Pfeiffer, 1952
- Gulella connollyi (Melvill & Ponsonby, 1909)
- Gulella conradti (E. von Martens, 1895)
- Gulella consanguinea (E. A. Smith, 1890)
- Gulella consobrina (Ancey, 1892)
- Gulella consociata (E. A. Smith, 1890)
- Gulella constricta Emberton, 2001
- Gulella contingens Burnup, 1925
- Gulella contraria Connolly, 1932
- Gulella copiosa (Preston, 1913)
- Gulella corneola (Morelet, 1886)
- Gulella costellata (Morelet, 1882)
- Gulella crassidens (L. Pfeiffer, 1859)
- Gulella crassilabris (Craven, 1881)
- Gulella craterodon (Melvill & Ponsonby, 1903)
- Gulella cruciata (E. von Martens, 1900)
- Gulella crux van Bruggen, 2011
- Gulella crystallum (Morelet, 1848)
- Gulella cupula van Bruggen & Van Goethem, 1999
- Gulella curvicolumella (Preston, 1913)
- Gulella curvilamella (E. A. Smith, 1890)
- Gulella cyclochilus Degner, 1934
- Gulella cylindrica (L. Pfeiffer, 1852)
- Gulella daedalea (Melvill & Ponsonby, 1903)
- Gulella darglensis (Melvill & Ponsonby, 1908)
- Gulella dartevillei Verdcourt, 1962
- Gulella dautzenbergi Connolly, 1928
- Gulella davisae Herbert, 2016
- Gulella decaryi Fischer-Piette & Vukadinovic, 1974
- Gulella decussatula (Preston, 1913)
- Gulella dejae Bursey & Herbert, 2004
- Gulella delicatula (L. Pfeiffer, 1857)
- Gulella dentiens (Morelet, 1883)
- Gulella devia Connolly, 1931
- Gulella deviae Herbert, 2006
- Gulella dextrorsa Burnup, 1925
- Gulella diabensis Connolly, 1939
- Gulella diodon (Morelet, 1882)
- Gulella discrepans (Sturany, 1898)
- Gulella disseminata (Preston, 1913)
- Gulella distincta (Melvill & Ponsonby, 1893)
- Gulella dohrni (E. A. Smith, 1882)
- Gulella dolichos Verdcourt, 1985
- Gulella doliolum (Morelet, 1867)
- Gulella dorri (Dautzenberg, 1890)
- Gulella drakensbergensis (Melvill & Ponsonby, 1893)
- Gulella duncani Connolly, 1930
- Gulella dunkeri (L. Pfeiffer, 1856)
- Gulella dupuisi Connolly, 1922
- Gulella dupuyana (Crosse, 1876)
- Gulella ectodentata van Bruggen & Van Goethem, 1999
- Gulella elliptica (Melvill & Ponsonby, 1898)
- Gulella enneodon Connolly, 1922
- Gulella eoryi Verdcourt, 2004
- Gulella erugo Rowson, Foster, Seddon & Tattersfield, 2019
- Gulella escalarai Ortiz de Zárate López & Ortiz de Zárate Rocandio, 1956
- Gulella eussoensis (Preston, 1913)
- Gulella euthymia (Melvill & Ponsonby, 1893)
- Gulella excavata (E. von Martens, 1892)
- Gulella excruciata Connolly, 1931
- Gulella exogonia (E. von Martens, 1895)
- Gulella expatriata (Preston, 1910)
- Gulella falconi Burnup, 1925
- Gulella farquhari (Melvill & Ponsonby, 1895)
- Gulella fernandensis Ortiz de Zárate López & Ortiz de Zárate Rocandio, 1956
- Gulella filix Connolly, 1922
- Gulella fischerpiettei Emberton, 2001
- Gulella formosa (Melvill & Ponsonby, 1898)
- Gulella fortidentata (E.A. Smith, 1890)
- Gulella fotobohitrae Emberton, 2001
- Gulella foveolata Preston, 1913
- Gulella framesi Burnup, 1926
- Gulella fraudator Connolly, 1939
- Gulella funerea (Preston, 1913)
- Gulella galactochila (Crosse, 1885)
- Gulella gallorum Fischer-Piette, Blanc, F. & Salvat, 1975
- Gulella garambae van Bruggen & Van Goethem, 1999
- Gulella genialis (Melvill & Ponsonby, 1903)
- Gulella gestroi (Germain, 1915)
- Gulella girardi (Kobelt, 1904)
- Gulella glabra (Morelet, 1882)
- Gulella godfreyi Burnup, 1925
- Gulella gouldi (L. Pfeiffer, 1856)
- Gulella greenwayi Verdcourt, 1953
- Gulella griffithsi Emberton, 2001
- Gulella guilielmi van Bruggen & Van Goethem, 1998
- Gulella gwendolinae (Preston, 1910)
- Gulella hadroglossa Herbert, 2016
- Gulella hafa Emberton, 2001
- Gulella hafahafa Emberton, 2001
- Gulella hamerae Bursey & Herbert, 2004
- Gulella handeiensis Verdcourt, 1953
- Gulella harriesi Burnup, 1926
- Gulella haullevillei (Dautzenberg & Germain, 1914)
- Gulella hector (Preston, 1913)
- Gulella helichrysophila Germain, 1934
- Gulella hemmingi Verdcourt, 1963
- Gulella herberti van Bruggen, 2004
- Gulella heteromphala Pilsbry, 1919
- Gulella hildae van Bruggen, 2001
- Gulella himerothales (Melvill & Ponsonby, 1903)
- Gulella hoqensis Neubert, 2004
- Gulella hordeum (Morelet, 1879)
- Gulella hughscotti Verdcourt, 1980
- Gulella humbloti (Morelet, 1886)
- Gulella impedita Connolly, 1922
- Gulella inconspicua (Thiele, 1911)
- Gulella incurvidens van Bruggen, 1972
- Gulella infans (Craven, 1881)
- Gulella infrendens (E. von Martens, 1866)
- Gulella ingloria (Preston, 1913)
- Gulella inhluzaniensis (Burnup, 1914)
- Gulella inobstructa van Bruggen, 1965
- Gulella insolita (E. A. Smith, 1903)
- Gulella instabilis (Sturany, 1898)
- Gulella insularis (Girard, 1894)
- Gulella insulincola van Bruggen, 1975
- Gulella intradentata (Preston, 1913)
- Gulella intrusa Verdcourt, 1956
- Gulella io Verdcourt, 1974
- Gulella iridescens (Preston, 1913)
- Gulella isipingoensis (Sturany, 1898)
- Gulella isseli (Paladilhe, 1872)
- Gulella jaominai Emberton, 2001
- Gulella jod (Preston, 1910)
- Gulella johannae van Bruggen, 2006
- Gulella johannesburgensis (Melvill & Ponsonby, 1907)
- Gulella jongkindi de Winter, 1996
- Gulella josephinae Emberton, 2001
- Gulella juxtidens (Melvill & Ponsonby, 1899)
- Gulella kelibea Emberton, 2001
- Gulella kelimolotra Emberton, 2002
- Gulella kendrae Emberton & Griffiths, 2009
- Gulella kidundae Adam, 1965
- Gulella kigeziensis (Preston, 1913)
- Gulella kohllarseni (Haas, 1936)
- Gulella kosiensis (Melvill & Ponsonby, 1908)
- Gulella kraussi (L. Pfeiffer, 1856)
- Gulella kulalensis Verdcourt, 1962
- Gulella labiotuberculata Connolly, 1942
- Gulella lacuna (Preston, 1911)
- Gulella laevigata (Dohrn, 1865)
- Gulella laevorsa Burnup, 1925
- Gulella lambda Degner, 1934
- Gulella lamyi (Dautzenberg & Germain, 1914)
- Gulella landianiensis (Dautzenberg, 1908)
- Gulella langei Rowson, Foster, Seddon & Tattersfield, 2019
- Gulella laninifia Emberton, 2002
- Gulella laqueus (Preston, 1913)
- Gulella larva (Morelet, 1877)
- Gulella latimerae Bursey & Herbert, 2004
- Gulella lawrencei van Bruggen, 1964
- † Gulella leakeyi Verdcourt, 1963
- Gulella lendix (E. A. Smith, 1890)
- Gulella lessensis Pilsbry, 1919
- Gulella leucocion Connolly, 1929
- Gulella lievrouwi van Bruggen & Van Goethem, 1999
- Gulella lima (Preston, 1913)
- Gulella lincolni Emberton & Griffiths, 2009
- Gulella lindae Herbert, 2006
- Gulella linguidens Connolly, 1939
- Gulella lissophanes (Melvill & Ponsonby, 1892)
- Gulella lohabea Emberton, 2001
- Gulella lornae Verdcourt, 1952
- Gulella loveridgei van Bruggen, 1996
- Gulella lubeti Fischer-Piette, Blanc, C.P., Blanc, F. & Salvat, 1994
- Gulella lubrica (Morelet, 1881)
- Gulella ludwigi Verdcourt & Venmans, 1953
- Gulella magnifica Emberton, 2001
- Gulella magnolia (Connolly, 1912)
- Gulella magnorchida Emberton, 2001
- Gulella mahafinaratra Emberton, 2001
- Gulella mahagaga Emberton, 2001
- Gulella mahia Emberton, 2001
- Gulella malasangiensis (Preston, 1913)
- Gulella mamellensis Griffiths, 2000
- Gulella manomboae Emberton, 2001
- Gulella mariae (Melvill & Ponsonby, 1892)
- Gulella marionae (Preston, 1910)
- Gulella maritzburgensis (Melvill & Ponsonby, 1893)
- Gulella marojejyae Emberton, 2001
- Gulella masoalae Emberton, 2001
- Gulella masis iensis Pilsbry, 1919
- Gulella matavymolotra Emberton, 2002
- Gulella matumbiensis Verdcourt, 1993
- Gulella mayottensis Connolly, 1925
- † Gulella mbili Pickford, 2009
- Gulella megapex Neubert, 2004
- Gulella melvilli (Burnup, 1914)
- Gulella meneleki (Preston, 1910)
- Gulella menkeana (L. Pfeiffer, 1853)
- Gulella menkhorsti van Bruggen, 2011
- Gulella meruensis (D'Ailly, 1910)
- Gulella mfongosiensis Burnup, 1925
- Gulella miaranoniae Emberton, 2001
- Gulella miaryi Fischer-Piette & Bedoucha, 1964
- Gulella micans K. L. Pfeiffer, 1952
- Gulella michellae Emberton, 2001
- Gulella microdina (Morelet, 1883)
- Gulella microdon (Morelet, 1860)
- Gulella microrutshuruensis van Bruggen, 1995
- Gulella microstriata Emberton, 2001
- Gulella mihomehia Emberton, 2001
- Gulella mikenoensis (Preston, 1913)
- Gulella miniata (F. Krauss, 1848)
- Gulella minuscula Emberton & Pearce, 2000
- Gulella minuta (Morelet, 1889)
- Gulella minutissima (Thiele, 1911)
- Gulella mitsikia Emberton, 2001
- Gulella mkuu Rowson, Seddon & Tattersfield, 2009
- Gulella modioliformis (Morelet, 1877)
- † Gulella moja Pickford, 2009
- Gulella mongolae Ortiz de Zárate Lopez & Ortiz de Zárate Rocandio, 1956
- Gulella monodon (Morelet, 1873)
- Gulella montium (D'Ailly, 1910)
- Gulella mooiensis (Burnup, 1914)
- Gulella msoalae Emberton, 2001
- Gulella multidentata (Sturany, 1898)
- Gulella munita (Melvill & Ponsonby, 1892)
- Gulella nakamaroa Emberton, 2001
- Gulella namorokae Emberton, 2001
- Gulella natalensis (Craven, 1881)
- Gulella ndibo Cole & Herbert, 2009
- Gulella nemoralis (Germain, 1915)
- Gulella nepia Connolly, 1925
- Gulella newmani Bursey & Herbert, 2004
- Gulella newtoni (E. A. Smith, 1890)
- Gulella ngorogoroensis Verdcourt, 1985
- Gulella nifikelia Emberton, 2001
- † Gulella nne Pickford, 2009
- Gulella noltei (Boettger, 1898)
- Gulella nosybei Emberton, 2001
- Gulella nuchalis van Bruggen, 2011
- Gulella nyikaensis (Preston, 1913)
- Gulella nyiroensis (Preston, 1913)
- Gulella obani Oke, 2007
- Gulella obovata (L. Pfeiffer, 1855)
- Gulella obstructa van Bruggen, 1965
- Gulella odhneriana Dupuis, 1923
- Gulella odietei Oke, 2013
- Gulella ogbeifuni Oke, 2013
- Gulella olkokolae W. Adam, 1965
- Gulella opoboensis (Preston, 1914)
- Gulella orchida Emberton, 2001
- Gulella orientalis Connolly, 1929
- Gulella oryza (Morelet, 1882)
- Gulella ovalis (Thiele, 1911)
- Gulella ovularis (Morelet, 1886)
- Gulella pangumana Connolly, 1928
- Gulella papyracea (Preston, 1913)
- Gulella paucidens Verdcourt, 1953
- Gulella pearcei Emberton, 2001
- Gulella peculiaris (E. A. Smith, 1890)
- Gulella penningtoni Burnup, 1925
- Gulella pentheri (Sturany, 1898)
- Gulella pentodon (Morelet, 1889)
- Gulella percivali (Preston, 1913)
- Gulella pergrata (Preston, 1913)
- Gulella perissodonta (Sturany, 1898)
- Gulella perlata Connolly, 1922
- Gulella perplexa Connolly, 1939
- Gulella perspicua (Melvill & Ponsonby, 1893)
- Gulella perspicuaeformis (Sturany, 1898)
- Gulella pervitrea (Preston, 1913)
- Gulella petitboucheti Emberton, 2001
- Gulella pfeifferi (Krauss in Kuster, 1844)
- Gulella phanerodon (Morelet, 1888)
- Gulella phragma (Melvill & Ponsonby, 1907)
- Gulella phyllisae Burnup, 1925
- Gulella planidens (E. von Martens, 1892)
- Gulella planti (L. Pfeiffer, 1856) – Plant's gulella snail
- Gulella platycostata Neubert, 2004
- Gulella plicigera (Morelet, 1886)
- Gulella polita (Melvill & Ponsonby, 1893)
- Gulella polloneriana Pilsbry, 1919
- Gulella pondoensis Connolly, 1939
- Gulella ponsonbyi (Burnup, 1914)
- Gulella porcina Connolly, 1930
- Gulella poutrini (Germain, 1918)
- Gulella praelonga Connolly, 1922
- Gulella premnodes (Sturany, 1902)
- Gulella prestoni Connolly, 1922
- Gulella pretoriana Connolly, 1932
- Gulella princei (Preston, 1911)
- Gulella protruda Neubert & Frank, 1996
- Gulella proxima van Bruggen, 2014
- Gulella pseudandreana Emberton, 2001
- Gulella pseudolkokolae Verdcourt, 2004
- Gulella puella Connolly, 1929
- Gulella pulchella (Melvill & Ponsonby, 1893)
- Gulella pusilla (Morelet, 1881)
- Gulella puzeyi Connolly, 1939
- Gulella queketti (Melvill & Ponsonby, 1896)
- Gulella raffrayi (Bourguignat, 1883)
- Gulella rakotoarisoni Emberton, 2001
- Gulella ranomasina Emberton, 2001
- Gulella razafyi Emberton, 2001
- Gulella rectangularis (Preston, 1913)
- Gulella reeae Emberton & Pearce, 2000
- Gulella reesi (Preston, 1914)
- Gulella reniformis (Preston, 1913)
- Gulella rewgidensis Neubert, 2004
- Gulella rhodesiana (Connolly, 1912)
- Gulella roberti (Preston, 1910)
- Gulella rogersi (Melvill & Ponsonby, 1898)
- Gulella rubinsterni Fischer-Piette, Blanc, C.P., Blanc, F. & Salvat, 1994
- Gulella rugosa Emberton, 2001
- Gulella rumpiana Connolly, 1932
- Gulella runa Rowson, Foster, Seddon & Tattersfield, 2019
- Gulella ruthae Emberton, 2002
- Gulella rutshuruensis Pilsbry, 1919
- Gulella ruwenzoriensis van Bruggen & van Goethem, 1999
- Gulella sahia Emberton, 2002
- Gulella salpinx Herbert, 2002
- Gulella sandersoni Connolly, 1942
- Gulella sankuruensis Dartevelle-Puissant, 1936
- Gulella satisfacta Fischer-Piette, Blanc, C.P., Blanc, F. & Salvat, 1994
- Gulella schweinfurthi (Thiele, 1910)
- Gulella sellae (Pollonera, 1906)
- Gulella seneciophila Germain, 1934
- Gulella separata (Sturany, 1898)
- Gulella sesamum (Morelet, 1883)
- Gulella sexdentata (E. von Martens, 1869)
- Gulella shabae Adam & Van Goethem, 1978
- Gulella shoaensis Verdcourt, 1985
- Gulella sibasana Connolly, 1922
- Gulella simplicima (Preston, 1911)
- † Gulella sita Pickford, 2009
- Gulella socialis Pilsbry, 1919
- Gulella socotrensis Neubert, 2004
- Gulella soror (E. A. Smith, 1890)
- Gulella soulaiana Fischer-Piette, 1973
- Gulella spreta (Morelet, 1883)
- Gulella stolidodea Degner, 1934
- Gulella streptostelopsis Bruggen, 2007
- Gulella strictilabris (Ancey, 1898)
- Gulella stylodon (E. von Martens, 1876)
- Gulella suavissima (Preston, 1913)
- Gulella subflavescens (E. A. Smith, 1890)
- Gulella subframesi Connolly, 1929
- Gulella subhyalina (E. A. Smith, 1890)
- Gulella subkraussi Connolly, 1932
- Gulella subringens (Crosse, 1886)
- Gulella subsellae Haas, 1936
- Gulella sursum van Bruggen, 2001
- Gulella swaziensis Connolly, 1932
- Gulella sylvia (Melvill & Ponsonby, 1903)
- Gulella syngenes (Preston, 1913)
- Gulella systemanaturae van Bruggen, 2008
- Gulella taitensis Verdcourt, 1963
- † Gulella tano Pickford, 2009
- Gulella taolantehezana Emberton, 2002
- † Gulella tatu Pickford, 2009
- Gulella tendronia Emberton, 2001
- Gulella tharfieldensis (Melvill & Ponsonby, 1893)
- Gulella thompsoni K. C. Emberton, Slapcinsky, Campbell, Rakotondrazafy, Andriamiarison & J. D. Emberton, 2010
- Gulella tietzae Cole & Herbert, 2009
- Gulella titania Connolly, 1928
- Gulella tomlini (Preston, 1911)
- Gulella tracheia Rowson, 2007
- Gulella translucida K. L. Pfeiffer, 1952
- Gulella transnominata Connolly, 1925
- Gulella triglochis (Melvill & Ponsonby, 1903)
- Gulella trigona (Morelet, 1881)
- Gulella triplicina (E. von Martens, 1895)
- Gulella tripodium Connolly, 1939
- Gulella tristaoensis Connolly, 1922
- Gulella tsara Emberton, 2001
- Gulella tsaratananae Emberton, 2001
- Gulella tudes (E. von Martens, 1895)
- Gulella udzungwensis van Bruggen, 2003
- Gulella ugandensis (E. A. Smith, 1901)
- Gulella uluguruensis Verdcourt, 1962
- Gulella umzimvubuensis Burnup, 1925
- Gulella unidentata K. L. Pfeiffer, 1952
- Gulella vakinifia Emberton, 2001
- Gulella vallaris (Melvill & Ponsonby, 1907)
- Gulella varians (E. A. Smith, 1899)
- Gulella vatosoa Emberton, 2001
- Gulella vavakelia Emberton, 2001
- Gulella ventricosa Neubert, 2004
- Gulella verdcourti van Bruggen, 1966
- Gulella vermis (Morelet, 1881)
- Gulella viae Burnup, 1925
- Gulella viatoris (Preston, 1913)
- Gulella vicina (E.A. Smith, 1899)
- Gulella virungae van Bruggen & van Goethem, 1999
- Gulella vohimarae Emberton, 2001
- Gulella vriesiana (C. M. F. Ancey, 1885)
- Gulella wahlbergi (F. Krauss, 1848)
- Gulella warrenii (Melvill & Ponsonby, 1903)
- Gulella wendalinae van Bruggen, 1975
- Gulella wilmattae (Pilsbry & Cockerell, 1933)
- Gulella woodhousei (Preston, 1913)
- Gulella xysila (Melvill & Ponsonby, 1907)
- Gulella zanaharyi Emberton, 2001
- Gulella zelota (Melvill & Ponsonby, 1907)
- Gulella zemenensis Verdcourt, 1990
- Gulella zuluensis Connolly, 1932
- Gulella sp. 1 sensu Emberton & Griffiths (2009)
- Gulella sp. 2 sensu Emberton & Griffiths (2009)
- Gulella sp. 3 sensu Emberton & Griffiths (2009)

Synonyms:

- Gulella amboniensis : synonym of Juventigulella amboniensis (Tattersfield, 1998) (original combination)
- Gulella avakubiensis Pilsbry, 1919: synonym of Avakubia avakubiensis (Pilsbry, 1919) (superseded combination)
- Gulella caryatis diabensis Connolly, 1939: synonym of Gulella diabensis Connolly, 1939 (original combination)
- Gulella conospira (Martens, 1892): synonym of Conogulella conospira (E. von Martens, 1892) (superseded combination)
- Gulella cuspidata Verdcourt, 1962: synonym of Dadagulella cuspidata (Verdcourt, 1962) (original combination)
- Gulella foliifera (E. von Martens, 1895): synonym of Primigulella foliifera (E. von Martens, 1895) (superseded combination)
- Gulella grossa (E. von Martens, 1892): synonym of Primigulella grossa (E. von Martens, 1892) (superseded combination)
- Gulella kuiperi de Winter, 2007: synonym of Silvigulella kuiperi (De Winter, 2006) (basionym)
- Gulella linguifera (Martens, 1895): synonym of Primigulella linguifera (E. von Martens, 1895) (superseded combination)
- Gulella ndamanyiluensis]] Venmans, 1956: synonym of Primigulella ndamanyiluensis (Venmans, 1956) (original combination)
- Gulella osborni Pilsbry, 1919: synonym of Silvigulella osborni (Pilsbry, 1919) (original combination)
- Gulella pupa (Thiele, 1911): synonym of Pupigulella pupa (Thiele, 1911) (superseded combination)
- Gulella selene van Bruggen & van Goethem, 1999: synonym of Dadagulella selene (van Bruggen & Van Goethem, 1999) (original combination)
- Gulella thomasseti is a synonym for Glabrennea thomasseti (Sykes, 1909)
- Gulella usambarica K. L. Pfeiffer, 1952: synonym of Gulella ludwigi Verdcourt & Venmans, 1953 (junior secondary homonym of Gulella usambarica (Craven, 1880); Gulella ludwigi Verdcourt & Venmans, 1953 is a replacement name)
- Gulella usambarica (Craven, 1880): synonym of Primigulella usambarica (Craven, 1880) (superseded combination)
