= Gabbia =

Gabbia may refer to:

- Gabbia (film)
- The Trap (1985 film)
- Gabbia (gastropod)
- Gabbia erawanensis
- Gabbia misella
- Matteo Gabbia, Italian footballer
- Cesare Gabbia, Italian rower
