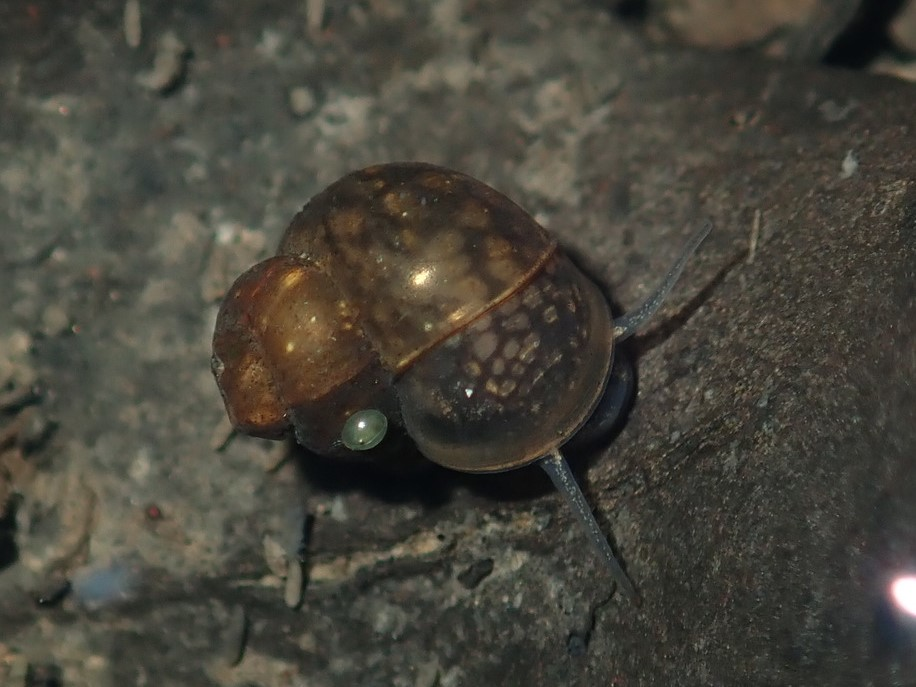
- Gabbia vertiginosa

Scientific classification
- Kingdom: Animalia
- Phylum: Mollusca
- Class: Gastropoda
- Subclass: Caenogastropoda
- Order: Littorinimorpha
- Family: Bithyniidae
- Genus: Gabbia; Tryon, 1865

= Gabbia (gastropod) =

Genus of gastropods

Gabbia is a genus of a freshwater snails with an operculum, aquatic prosobranch gastropod mollusks in the family Bithyniidae.

Glöer & Pešić (2012) recognized Gabbia as a subgenus of the genus Bithynia.

== Species ==
IUCN Red List of Threatened Species recognized 11 species of Gabbia in 2013.

- Gabbia adusta Ponder, 2003
- Gabbia affinis (Brazier ms Smith, 1882)
- Gabbia alticola Annandale, 1918
- Gabbia beecheyi Ponder, 2003
- Gabbia campicola Ponder, 2003
- Gabbia carinata Ponder, 2003
- Gabbia clathrata Ponder, 2003
- Gabbia davisi Ponder, 2003
- Gabbia erawanensis (Prayoonhong, Chitramvong & Upatham, 1990)
- Gabbia fontana Ponder, 2003
- Gabbia iredalei Cotton, 1942
- Gabbia kendricki Ponder, 2003
- Gabbia kessneri Ponder, 2003
- Gabbia lutaria Ponder, 2003
- Gabbia microcosta Ponder, 2003
- Gabbia napierensis Ponder, 2003
- Gabbia obesa Ponder, 2003
- Gabbia orcula Frauenfeld, 1862
- Gabbia pallidula Ponder, 2003
- Gabbia rotunda Ponder, 2003
- Gabbia sistanica (Annandale & Prashad, 1919) / Bithynia (Gabbia) sistanica (Annandale & Prashad, 1919)
- Gabbia smithii (Tate, 1882)
- Gabbia spiralis Ponder, 2003
- Gabbia stenothyroides Dohrn, 1857
- Gabbia travancorica (Benson, 1860)
- Gabbia tumida Ponder, 2003
- Gabbia vertiginosa (Frauenfeld, 1862) - synonym: Gabbia australis Tryon, 1865 - type species

Synonyms:

- Gabbia misella Gredler, 1884 is a synonym of Bithynia misella (Gredler, 1884)
- Gabbia pygmaea Preston, 1908 is a synonym of Bithynia pygmaea Preston, 1908
- Gabbia wykoffi Brandt, 1968 is a synonym of Bithynia walkeri (Brandt, 1968)
