= Parafossarulus priscillae =

Parafossarulus priscillae Temporal range: Pliocene–Early Pleistocene

Scientific classification
- Kingdom: Animalia
- Phylum: Mollusca
- Class: Gastropoda
- Subclass: Caenogastropoda
- Order: Littorinimorpha
- Family: Bithyniidae
- Genus: Parafossarulus
- Species: P. priscillae

Binomial name
- Parafossarulus priscillae (Girotti, 1972)

Synonyms
- Neumayria priscillae Girotti, 1972 Bithynia (Parafossarulus) priscillae (Girotti, 1972)

Extinct species of gastropod

Parafossarulus priscillae is an extinct species of freshwater snail with gills and an operculum, an aquatic prosobranch gastropod mollusk in the family Bithyniidae.

Glöer (2002) reassigned two European extinct species of Parafossarulus to a subgenus of the genus Bithynia, but the genus Parafossarulus is generally accepted for Asian species.

== Distribution ==
The (fossil) distribution of this species includes:

- Italy
- France
- the Netherlands
- England
