= G. rosea =

G. rosea may refer to:

- Gabbiella rosea, a gastropod species endemic to Kenya
- Gaertnera rosea, a plant species endemic to Sri Lanka
- Geocrinia rosea, the karri or roseate frog, a frog species endemic to Southwest Australia
- Grammostola rosea, the Chilean rose tarantula, the Chilean flame tarantula or Chilean fire tarantula, a spider species

== See also ==
- Rosea (disambiguation)
