= Bithynia majorcina =

Scientific classification
- Kingdom: Animalia
- Phylum: Mollusca
- Class: Gastropoda
- Subclass: Caenogastropoda
- Order: Littorinimorpha
- Superfamily: Truncatelloidea
- Family: Bithyniidae
- Genus: Bithynia
- Species: B. majorcina

Binomial name
- Bithynia majorcina Glöer & Rolán, 2007

Species of gastropod

Bithynia majorcina is a species of small freshwater snail with an operculum, an aquatic gastropod mollusc in the family Bithyniidae.

== Description ==
Shell yellowish horn-coloured, glossy, with 5.5 whorls, suture shallow, aperture oval rounded at the top, umbilicus slit like. Shell height 7.6-9.5 mm, width 4.9-6.0 mm.

== Distribution ==
The species is only known from Majorca where it lives on calcareous bottom of consolidate sediments with stones in the Torrent (Mountain stream) Son Jordi, which is the locus typicus, and in the Torrent de Sóller.
