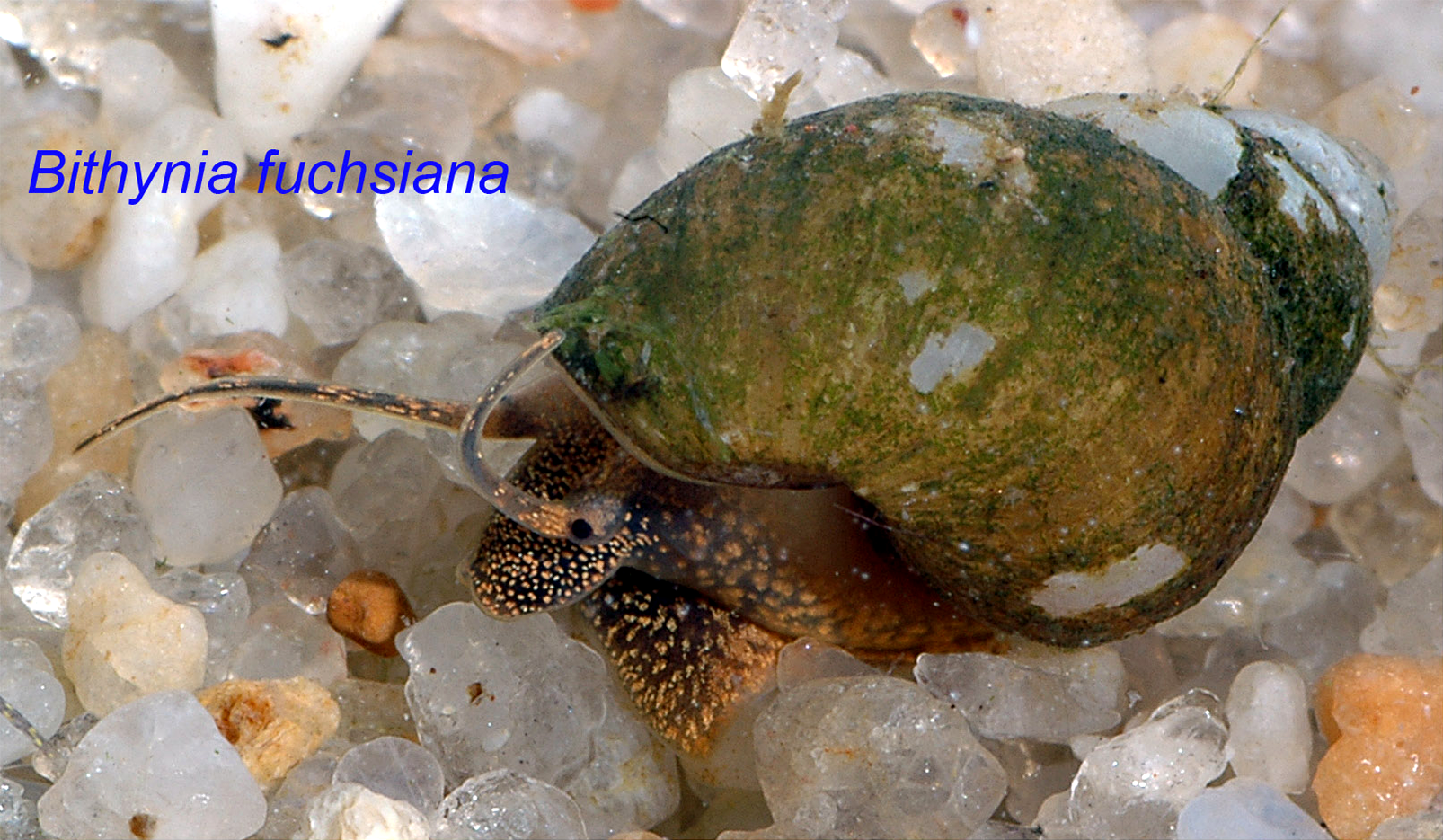
- Live Bithynia fuchsiana

Conservation status
- Least Concern (IUCN 3.1)

Scientific classification
- Kingdom: Animalia
- Phylum: Mollusca
- Class: Gastropoda
- Subclass: Caenogastropoda
- Order: Littorinimorpha
- Superfamily: Truncatelloidea
- Family: Bithyniidae
- Genus: Bithynia
- Species: B. fuchsiana

Binomial name
- Bithynia fuchsiana (Möllendorff, 1888)

= Bithynia fuchsiana =

Species of gastropod

Bithynia fuchsiana is a species of small freshwater snail with a gill and an operculum. It an aquatic gastropod mollusk in the family Bithyniidae.

== Distribution ==
Distribution of this species includes:

- southern and eastern China
- Taiwan
- the Red River delta, Vietnam

== Ecology ==
Bithynia fuchsiana inhabits lentic habitats such as lakes, rice fields, ponds and others. It serves as the first intermediate host for the trematode Clonorchis sinensis.
