= Wattebledia siamensis =

- Apertural view of the shell of Wattebledia siamensis

Conservation status
- Least Concern (IUCN 3.1)

Scientific classification
- Kingdom: Animalia
- Phylum: Mollusca
- Class: Gastropoda
- Subclass: Caenogastropoda
- Order: Littorinimorpha
- Family: Bithyniidae
- Genus: Wattebledia
- Species: W. siamensis

Binomial name
- Wattebledia siamensis Moellendorff, 1902

Species of gastropod

Wattebledia siamensis is a species of freshwater snail with a gill and an operculum, an aquatic gastropod mollusk in the family Bithyniidae.

== Distribution ==
The native distribution of this species includes:

- Thailand
