= Bithynia bavelensis =

Bithynia bavelensis Temporal range: Early Pleistocene

Scientific classification
- Kingdom: Animalia
- Phylum: Mollusca
- Class: Gastropoda
- Subclass: Caenogastropoda
- Order: Littorinimorpha
- Superfamily: Truncatelloidea
- Family: Bithyniidae
- Genus: Bithynia
- Species: B. bavelensis

Binomial name
- Bithynia bavelensis Meijer, 1990

Extinct species of gastropod

Bithynia bavelensis is an extinct species of freshwater snail with gills and an operculum, an aquatic prosobranch gastropod mollusk in the family Bithyniidae.

The specific name bavelensis refers to its type locality, the village Bavel, Netherlands.

== Distribution ==
The distribution of this species includes an Early Pleistocene of the Netherlands.

== Description ==
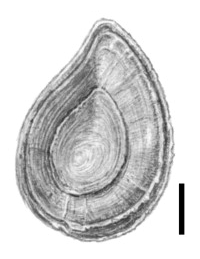
Operculum of Bithynia bavelensis.
