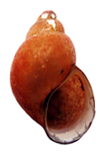
- Photo of an apertural view of a shell of Hydrobioides nassa

Conservation status
- Least Concern (IUCN 3.1)

Scientific classification
- Kingdom: Animalia
- Phylum: Mollusca
- Class: Gastropoda
- Subclass: Caenogastropoda
- Order: Littorinimorpha
- Family: Bithyniidae
- Genus: Hydrobioides
- Species: H. nassa

Binomial name
- Hydrobioides nassa (Theobald, 1865)

Synonyms
- Bithinia nassa Theobald, 1865; Hydrobioides avarix Annandale, 1918; Hydrobioides dautzenbergi Walker, 1927

= Hydrobioides nassa =

Species of gastropod

Hydrobioides nassa is a species of a freshwater snail with an operculum, aquatic prosobranch gastropod mollusk in the family Bithyniidae.

This species occurs in Laos, Myanmar and Thailand.

Hydrobioides nassa lives in freshwater rivers, lakes and ponds.
