= Wattebledia crosseana =

- Apertural view of the shell of Wattebledia crosseana

Scientific classification
- Kingdom: Animalia
- Phylum: Mollusca
- Class: Gastropoda
- Subclass: Caenogastropoda
- Order: Littorinimorpha
- Family: Bithyniidae
- Genus: Wattebledia
- Species: W. crosseana

Binomial name
- Wattebledia crosseana (Wattebled, 1886)

Species of gastropod

Wattebledia crosseana is a species of freshwater snail with a gill and an operculum, an aquatic gastropod mollusk in the family Bithyniidae.

The specific name crosseana is in honor of French conchologist Joseph Charles Hippolyte Crosse.

== Distribution ==
The native distribution of this species includes:

- Thailand
