= Gabbia pygmaea =

- Apertural view of the shell of Gabbia pygmaea

Conservation status
- Data Deficient (IUCN 3.1)

Scientific classification
- Kingdom: Animalia
- Phylum: Mollusca
- Class: Gastropoda
- Subclass: Caenogastropoda
- Order: Littorinimorpha
- Family: Bithyniidae
- Genus: Gabbia
- Species: G. pygmaea

Binomial name
- Gabbia pygmaea (Preston, 1908)

Synonyms
- Bithynia (Gabbia) pygmaea Preston, 1908; Bithynia pygmaeaPreston, 1908; Bulimus pygmaea (Preston, 1908)

Species of gastropod

Gabbia pygmaea is a species of freshwater snail with a gill and an operculum, an aquatic gastropod mollusk in the family Bithyniidae. It may be threatened by damming of Mekong (both current and planned) and water pollution from industrialisation.

== Distribution ==
The native distribution of this species includes:

- Malaysia
- Burma
- Thailand

The non-native distribution of this species includes the United States.
