= Bithynia manonellesi =

Scientific classification
- Domain: Eukaryota
- Kingdom: Animalia
- Phylum: Mollusca
- Class: Gastropoda
- Subclass: Caenogastropoda
- Order: Littorinimorpha
- Superfamily: Truncatelloidea
- Family: Bithyniidae
- Genus: Bithynia
- Species: B. manonellesi

Binomial name
- Bithynia manonellesi Altaba, 2007

Species of gastropod

Bithynia manonellesi is a species of small freshwater snail with a gill and an operculum, an aquatic prosobranch gastropod mollusc in the family Bithyniidae.

== Distribution ==
This species occurs in:

- The Balearic Islands
