= Gabbiella humerosa =

Conservation status
- Least Concern (IUCN 3.1)

Scientific classification
- Kingdom: Animalia
- Phylum: Mollusca
- Class: Gastropoda
- Subclass: Caenogastropoda
- Order: Littorinimorpha
- Family: Bithyniidae
- Genus: Gabbiella
- Species: G. humerosa

Binomial name
- Gabbiella humerosa (Martens, 1879)

Species of gastropod

Gabbiella humerosa is a species of small freshwater snails with an operculum, aquatic prosobranch gastropod mollusks in the family Bithyniidae.

This species is found in Kenya, Tanzania, Democratic Republic of Congo, and Uganda. Its natural habitat is freshwater lakes.
