= Gabbiella stanleyi =

Conservation status
- Vulnerable (IUCN 3.1)

Scientific classification
- Kingdom: Animalia
- Phylum: Mollusca
- Class: Gastropoda
- Subclass: Caenogastropoda
- Order: Littorinimorpha
- Family: Bithyniidae
- Genus: Gabbiella
- Species: G. stanleyi

Binomial name
- Gabbiella stanleyi (E. A. Smith, 1877)

Synonyms
- Bythinia stanleyi E. A. Smith, 1877

Species of gastropod

Gabbiella stanleyi is a species of small freshwater snails with an operculum, aquatic prosobranch gastropod mollusks in the family Bithyniidae.

The specific name stanleyi is in honor of explorer Henry Morton Stanley.

This species is endemic to Lake Malawi.
