= Parafossarulus sungariensis =

Conservation status
- Data Deficient (IUCN 3.1)

Scientific classification
- Kingdom: Animalia
- Phylum: Mollusca
- Class: Gastropoda
- Subclass: Caenogastropoda
- Order: Littorinimorpha
- Family: Bithyniidae
- Genus: Parafossarulus
- Species: P. sungariensis

Binomial name
- Parafossarulus sungariensis Moskvicheva in Starobogatov & Zatravkin, 1987

Species of gastropod

Parafossarulus sungariensis is a species of freshwater snail with gills and an operculum, an aquatic prosobranch gastropod mollusk in the family Bithyniidae.

The specific name sungariensis comes from the name of the Sungari River, where this species was found.

== Distribution ==
This species occurs in Heilongjiang Province and in Jilin Province in northeastern China.

The type locality is the Sungari River basin, a small lake near Harbin.

== Habitat ==
Parafossarulus sungariensis lives in freshwater lakes and rivers.
