= Gulella claustralis =

Conservation status
- Endangered (IUCN 3.1)

Scientific classification
- Kingdom: Animalia
- Phylum: Mollusca
- Class: Gastropoda
- Order: Stylommatophora
- Family: Streptaxidae
- Genus: Gulella
- Species: G. claustralis

Binomial name
- Gulella claustralis Connolly, 1939

Species of gastropod

Gulella claustralis is a species of very small air-breathing land snail, terrestrial pulmonate gastropod mollusk in the family Streptaxidae.

This species is endemic to South Africa. Its natural habitat is subtropical or tropical moist lowland forests. It is threatened by habitat loss.
