= Gabbiella balovalensis =

Conservation status
- Data Deficient (IUCN 3.1)

Scientific classification
- Kingdom: Animalia
- Phylum: Mollusca
- Class: Gastropoda
- Subclass: Caenogastropoda
- Order: Littorinimorpha
- Family: Bithyniidae
- Genus: Gabbiella
- Species: G. balovalensis

Binomial name
- Gabbiella balovalensis (Mandahl-Barth, 1968)

Species of gastropod

Gabbiella balovalensis is a species of small freshwater snails with an operculum, aquatic prosobranch gastropod mollusks in the family Bithyniidae.

This species is found in Malawi and Zambia. Its natural habitat is freshwater lakes.
