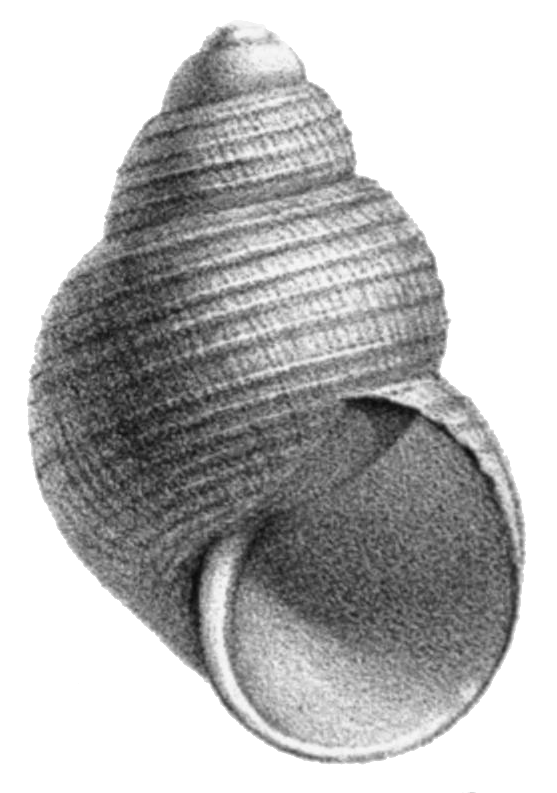
- Drawing of an apertural view of the shell of Parafossarulus manchouricus.

Scientific classification
- Kingdom: Animalia
- Phylum: Mollusca
- Class: Gastropoda
- Subclass: Caenogastropoda
- Order: Littorinimorpha
- Family: Bithyniidae
- Genus: Parafossarulus
- Species: P. manchouricus

Binomial name
- Parafossarulus manchouricus (Gerstfeldt in Bourguignat, 1860)

Synonyms
- Bythinia manchourica Gerstfeldt – Bourguignat, 1860

= Parafossarulus manchouricus =

Species of gastropod

Parafossarulus manchouricus is a species of freshwater snail with gills and an operculum, an aquatic prosobranch gastropod mollusk in the family Bithyniidae.

This species is medically important as a host for the liver fluke Clonorchis sinensis in East Asia.

== Subspecies ==
- Parafossarulus manchouricus japonicus (Pilsbry, 1901)

== Description ==
The shell has 5.5 whorls. The width of the shell is 6 mm. The height of the shell is 10 mm.

The haploid chromosome number of Parafossarulus manchouricus is n=17.

== Distribution ==
This species occurs in: Russia (Amur River basin), Japan (Honshū, Kyushu and Shikoku), Korea, Taiwan and China.

The type locality is the Amur River and other rivers in the southern Siberia ("le fleuve Amour et divers cours d'eau de la Sibérie méridionale").

== Habitat ==
Parafossarulus manchouricus lives in shallow ponds and in irrigation channels.

== Parasites ==
This species is a first intermediate host for Clonorchis sinensis.
