= Parafossarulus anomalospiralis =

Scientific classification
- Kingdom: Animalia
- Phylum: Mollusca
- Class: Gastropoda
- Subclass: Caenogastropoda
- Order: Littorinimorpha
- Family: Bithyniidae
- Genus: Parafossarulus
- Species: P. anomalospiralis

Binomial name
- Parafossarulus anomalospiralis Liu, Li & Liu, 1985

Species of gastropod

Parafossarulus anomalospiralis is a species of freshwater snail with gills and an operculum, an aquatic prosobranch gastropod mollusk in the family Bithyniidae.

== Distribution ==
This species occurs in Jilin Province, China.

== Description ==
The shell has four whorls. The suture is deep. The width of the shell is 9.0–9.5 mm. The height of the shell is 15.0–18.0 mm.

Reproductive system and radula was described by Liu et al. (1985).

== Parasites ==
Parafossarulus anomalospiralis is the first intermediate host for:

- trematode Clonorchis sinensis
