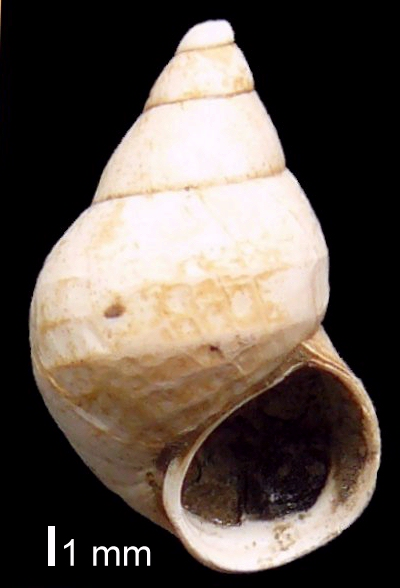
- The shell of Parafossarulus crassitesta

Scientific classification
- Kingdom: Animalia
- Phylum: Mollusca
- Class: Gastropoda
- Subclass: Caenogastropoda
- Order: Littorinimorpha
- Family: Bithyniidae
- Genus: Parafossarulus; Annandale, 1924

Type species
- Paludina striatula Benson, 1842

= Parafossarulus =

Parafossarulus Temporal range: Pleistocene–Recent

Genus of gastropods

Parafossarulus is a genus of freshwater snails with gills and an operculum, an aquatic prosobranch gastropod mollusks in the family Bithyniidae.

== Species ==
Species within the genus Parafossarulus include:

- Parafossarulus anomalospiralis Liu, Li & Liu, 1985
- † Parafossarulus crassitesta (Bröhmme, 1885)
- Parafossarulus eximius (Frauenfeld)
- Parafossarulus globosus Liu, Zhang & Wang, 1994
- † Parafossarulus priscillae Girotti, 1972
- Parafossarulus manchouricus (Gerstfeldt in Bourguignat, 1860)
- Parafossarulus spiridonovi Zatrawkin & Starobogatov in Zatrawkin, Dovgalev & Starobogatov, 1989
- Parafossarulus striatulus (Benson, 1842) - type species
- Parafossarulus sungariensis Moskvicheva in Starobogatov, Zatravkin, 1987

== Taxonomy ==
Glöer (2002) reassigned two European extinct species of Parafossarulus into a subgenus of the genus Bithynia, but the genus Parafossarulus is generally accepted for the Asian species.
