= Gulella puzeyi =

Conservation status
- Critically Endangered (IUCN 3.1)

Scientific classification
- Kingdom: Animalia
- Phylum: Mollusca
- Class: Gastropoda
- Order: Stylommatophora
- Family: Streptaxidae
- Genus: Gulella
- Species: G. puzeyi

Binomial name
- Gulella puzeyi Connolly, 1939

Species of gastropod

Gulella puzeyi is a species of very small air-breathing land snail, a terrestrial pulmonate gastropod mollusk in the family Streptaxidae.

This species is endemic to South Africa. Its natural habitat is subtropical or tropical dry forests. It is threatened by habitat loss.
