= Gulella aprosdoketa =

Conservation status
- Endangered (IUCN 3.1)

Scientific classification
- Kingdom: Animalia
- Phylum: Mollusca
- Class: Gastropoda
- Order: Stylommatophora
- Family: Streptaxidae
- Genus: Gulella
- Species: G. aprosdoketa

Binomial name
- Gulella aprosdoketa Connolly, 1939

Species of gastropod

Gulella aprosdoketa is a species of very small air-breathing land snail, terrestrial pulmonate gastropod mollusk in the family Streptaxidae.

This species is endemic to the coastal scarp forest and woodland in the Eastern Cape Province of South Africa, and has only been observed within an 80 km-long strip along the Eastern Cape coast. Human activities, such as construction, tourism, and livestock use, are major contributors to its habitat loss.
