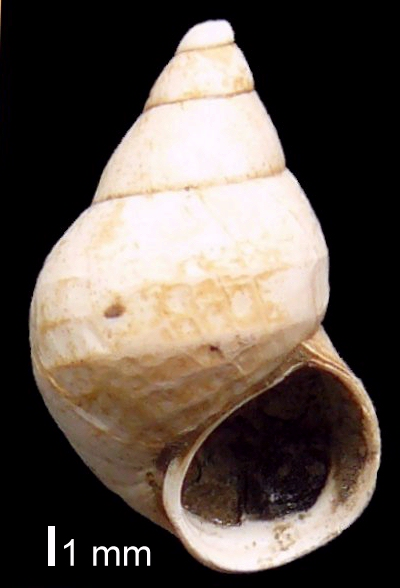
- The shell of Parafossarulus crassitesta

Scientific classification
- Kingdom: Animalia
- Phylum: Mollusca
- Class: Gastropoda
- Subclass: Caenogastropoda
- Order: Littorinimorpha
- Family: Bithyniidae
- Genus: Parafossarulus
- Species: P. crassitesta

Binomial name
- Parafossarulus crassitesta (Brömme, 1885)

Synonyms
- Bithynia (Parafossarulus) crassitesta

= Parafossarulus crassitesta =

Parafossarulus crassitesta Temporal range: Pleistocene

Extinct species of gastropod

Parafossarulus crassitesta is an extinct species of freshwater snail with gills and an operculum, an aquatic prosobranch gastropod mollusk in the family Bithyniidae.

Glöer (2002) reassigned two European extinct species of Parafossarulus as a subgenus of the genus Bithynia, but genus Parafossarulus is generally accepted for Asian species.

== Distribution ==
This species occurred in Europe in the Pleistocene Epoch.
