= Parafossarulus spiridonovi =

Scientific classification
- Kingdom: Animalia
- Phylum: Mollusca
- Class: Gastropoda
- Subclass: Caenogastropoda
- Order: Littorinimorpha
- Family: Bithyniidae
- Genus: Parafossarulus
- Species: P. spiridonovi

Binomial name
- Parafossarulus spiridonovi Zatrawkin & Starobogatov in Zatrawkin, Dovgalev & Starobogatov, 1989

Species of gastropod

Parafossarulus spiridonovi is a species of freshwater snail with gills and an operculum, an aquatic prosobranch gastropod mollusk in the family Bithyniidae.

The specific name spiridonovi is apparently in honour of Croatian malacologist Spiridon Brusina.

== Distribution ==
The type locality of this species is near the village of Kirovo, in the basin of the Bidzan River in Jewish Autonomous Oblast, Khabarovsky District, Russia.

The species is also found in the Illistaya River and the Arsenjevka river (Primorsky Krai).

== Parasites ==
Parafossarulus spiridonovi serves as the first intermediate host for the trematode Notocotylus intestinalis (natural infection).

Parafossarulus spiridonovi serves as an intermediate host for the trematode Psilotrema acutilostris.

Parafossarulus spiridonovi serves as the first intermediate host for the trematode Holostephanus nipponicus (experimental infection) and for Echinochasmus spinosus (experimental infection).

Parafossarulus spiridonovi serves as the second intermediate host for the trematode Sphaeridiotrema monorchis (experimental infection).
