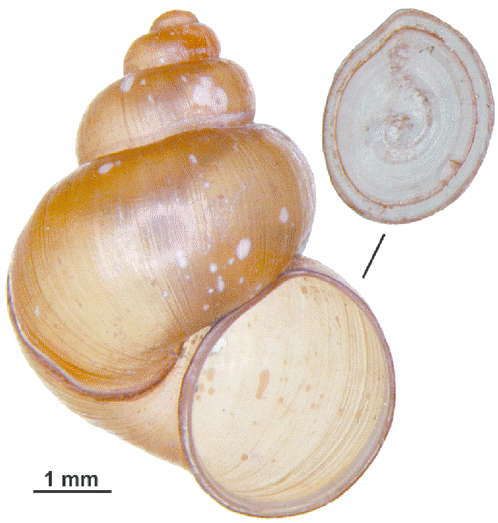

Scientific classification
- Kingdom: Animalia
- Phylum: Mollusca
- Class: Gastropoda
- Subclass: Caenogastropoda
- Order: Littorinimorpha
- Superfamily: Truncatelloidea
- Family: Bithyniidae
- Genus: Bithynia
- Species: B. transsilvanica

Binomial name
- Bithynia transsilvanica (Bielz, 1853)

Synonyms
- Bithynia leachii troschelii; Bithynia troschelii (Paasch, 1842)

= Bithynia transsilvanica =

Species of gastropod

Bithynia transsilvanica is a species of freshwater snail, an aquatic prosobranch gastropod mollusk in the family Bithyniidae.

== Taxonomy ==
It was sometimes considered to be an eastern subspecies of Bithynia leachii, and then it was known as Bithynia leachii troschelii.

Specific epithet troschelii of its synonym is in honor of German zoologist Franz Hermann Troschel.

== Distribution ==
- Czech Republic – It was thought to be locally extinct in Moravia and was considered as regionally extinct in the Czech Republic (RE). There were rediscovered populations in southern Moravia near Lednice and from Nesyt pond in 2008. It was also discovered in Bohemia as a non-indigenous.
- Slovakia
- Germany – Recorded in Berlin, Brandenburg, Hamburg, Mecklenburg-Vorpommern, Lower Saxony and Thuringia. It is considered as high endangered (Stark gefährdet) in Mecklenburg-Vorpommern and in Lower Saxony.
- Hungary

== Description ==
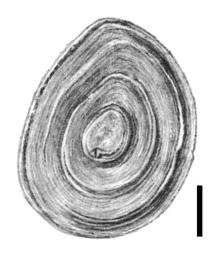
Operculum of Bithynia transsilvanica

Height of shell: 9–11 mm. Width of shell: 5–6 mm.

== Habitat ==
Freshwater species.
