= Wattebledia baschi =

- Apertural view of the shell of Wattebledia baschi

Scientific classification
- Kingdom: Animalia
- Phylum: Mollusca
- Class: Gastropoda
- Subclass: Caenogastropoda
- Order: Littorinimorpha
- Family: Bithyniidae
- Genus: Wattebledia
- Species: W. baschi

Binomial name
- Wattebledia baschi (Brandt, 1968)

Species of gastropod

Wattebledia baschi is a species of freshwater snail with a gill and an operculum, an aquatic gastropod mollusk in the family Bithyniidae.

== Distribution ==
The native distribution of this species includes:

- Thailand
