= Gaertnera walkeri =

Conservation status
- Vulnerable (IUCN 2.3)

Scientific classification
- Kingdom: Plantae
- Clade: Tracheophytes
- Clade: Angiosperms
- Clade: Eudicots
- Clade: Asterids
- Order: Gentianales
- Family: Rubiaceae
- Genus: Gaertnera
- Species: G. walkeri

Binomial name
- Gaertnera walkeri (Arn.) Blume

Synonyms
- Sykesia walkeri Arn.

Species of plant

Gaertnera walkeri is a species of plant in the family Rubiaceae. It is endemic to Sri Lanka.
