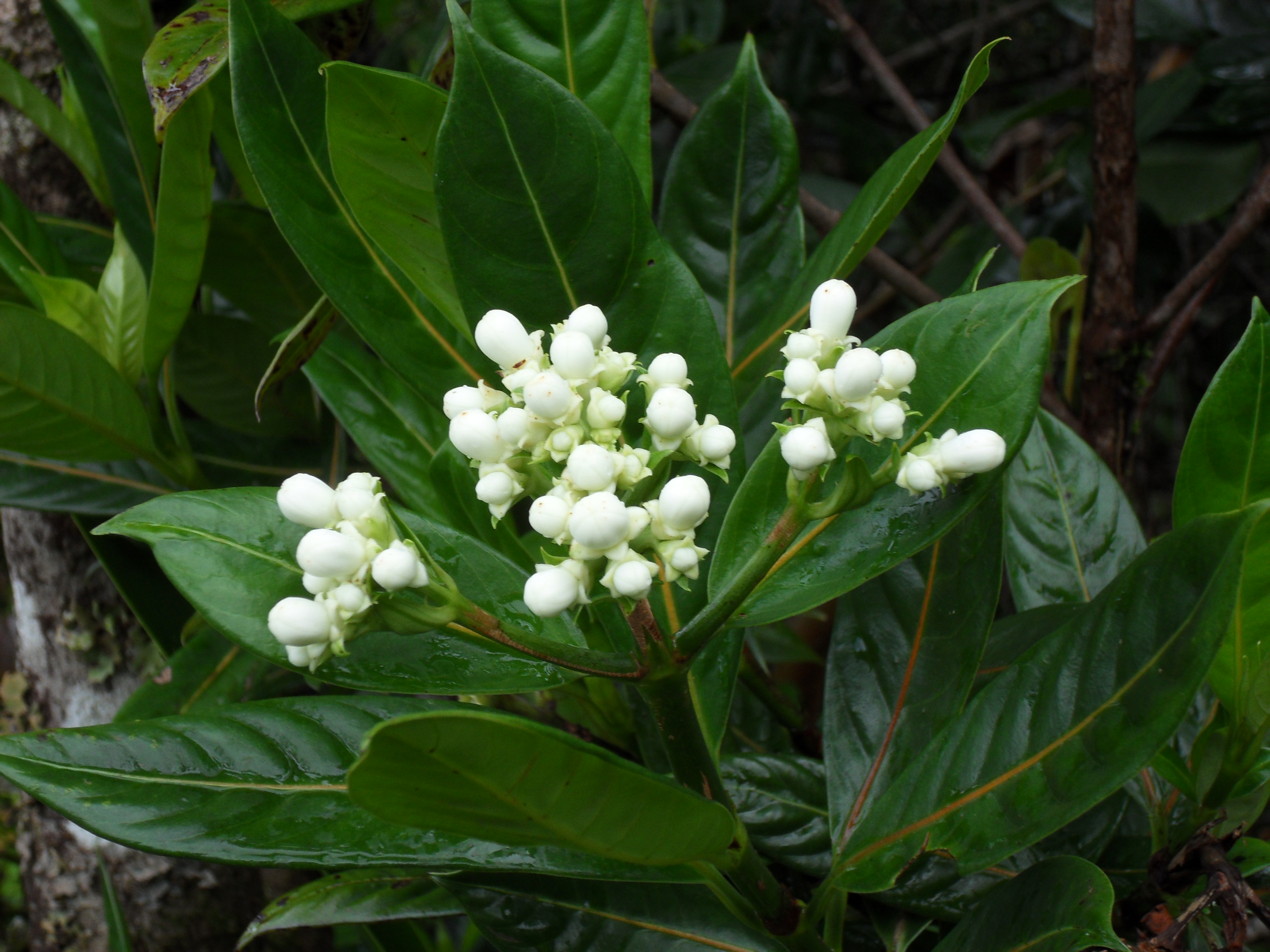
- Gaertnera vaginata

Scientific classification
- Kingdom: Plantae
- Clade: Tracheophytes
- Clade: Angiosperms
- Clade: Eudicots
- Clade: Asterids
- Order: Gentianales
- Family: Rubiaceae
- Subfamily: Rubioideae
- Tribe: Gaertnereae
- Genus: Gaertnera; Lam.

Synonyms
- Aetheonema Rchb.; Andersonia Willd. ex Schult.; Fructesca DC. ex Meisn.; Hymenocnemis Hook.f.; Pristidia Thwaites; Sykesia Arn.

= Gaertnera =

Genus of plants

Gaertnera is a genus of flowering plants in the family Rubiaceae. There are at least 85 species distributed across the Old World tropics from Africa to Asia.

Plants in this genus are variable in appearance and biology. Most all are regional endemics, plants limited to a small geographical area and narrowly adapted to local conditions. Most grow in moist forest habitat.

These are generally woody plants with clusters of white, pink, or red flowers and purple-black fruits. Some species are distylous, with plants having one of two flower morphs. Other species are dioecious, with plants having either male or female flowers. Dioecious species are generally found in Southeast Asia.

== Species ==
As of March 2023, Plants of the World Online accepted the following species:

- Gaertnera alata Bremek. ex Malcomber & A.P.Davis
- Gaertnera alstonii Malcomber
- Gaertnera aphanodioica Malcomber
- Gaertnera arenaria Baker
- Gaertnera arenarioides C.M.Taylor
- Gaertnera aurea Malcomber
- Gaertnera bambusifolia Malcomber & A.P.Davis
- Gaertnera belumutensis Malcomber
- Gaertnera bieleri (De Wild.) E.M.A.Petit
- Gaertnera breviflora C.M.Taylor
- Gaertnera brevipedicellata Malcomber & A.P.Davis
- Gaertnera calycina Bojer
- Gaertnera capitulata Malcomber
- Gaertnera cardiocarpa Boivin ex Baill.
- Gaertnera cooperi Hutch. & M.B.Moss
- Gaertnera crassiflora Bojer
- Gaertnera cuneifolia Bojer
- Gaertnera darcyana Malcomber & A.P.Davis
- Gaertnera divaricata (Thwaites) Thwaites
- Gaertnera diversifolia Ridl.
- Gaertnera drakeana Aug.DC.
- Gaertnera edentata Bojer
- Gaertnera eketensis Wernham
- Gaertnera fractiflexa Beusekom
- Gaertnera furcellata (Baill. ex Vatke) Malcomber & A.P.Davis
- Gaertnera gabonensis Malcomber
- Gaertnera × gardneri Thwaites
- Gaertnera globigera Beusekom
- Gaertnera grisea Hook.f. ex C.B.Clarke
- Gaertnera guillotii Hochr.
- Gaertnera hirsuta C.M.Taylor
- Gaertnera hirtiflora Verdc.
- Gaertnera hispida Aug.DC.
- Gaertnera humblotii Drake
- Gaertnera ianthina Malcomber
- Gaertnera inflexa Boivin ex Baill.
- Gaertnera junghuhniana Miq.
- Gaertnera kochummenii Malcomber
- Gaertnera laevis C.M.Taylor
- Gaertnera letouzeyi Malcomber
- Gaertnera leucothyrsa (K.Krause) E.M.A.Petit
- Gaertnera liberiensis E.M.A.Petit
- Gaertnera littoralis C.M.Taylor
- Gaertnera longifolia Bojer
- Gaertnera longivaginalis (Schweinf. ex Hiern) E.M.A.Petit
- Gaertnera lowryi Malcomber
- Gaertnera luteocarpa Jongkind
- Gaertnera macrobotrys Baker
- Gaertnera macrostipula Baker
- Gaertnera madagascariensis (Hook.f.) Malcomber & A.P.Davis
- Gaertnera malcomberiana C.M.Taylor
- Gaertnera masoalana C.M.Taylor
- Gaertnera microphylla Capuron ex Malcomber & A.P.Davis
- Gaertnera monstruosa Malcomber
- Gaertnera monticola Jongkind
- Gaertnera nitida C.M.Taylor
- Gaertnera obesa Hook.f. ex C.B.Clarke
- Gaertnera oblanceolata King & Gamble
- Gaertnera obovata Baker
- Gaertnera paniculata Benth.
- Gaertnera pauciflora Malcomber & A.P.Davis
- Gaertnera pedunculata Jongkind
- Gaertnera pendula Bojer
- Gaertnera phanerophlebia Baker
- Gaertnera phyllosepala Baker
- Gaertnera phyllostachya Baker
- Gaertnera psychotrioides (DC.) Baker
- Gaertnera rakotovaoana C.M.Taylor
- Gaertnera ramosa Ridl.
- Gaertnera raphaelii Malcomber
- Gaertnera razakamalalana C.M.Taylor
- Gaertnera robusta C.M.Taylor
- Gaertnera rosea Thwaites ex Benth.
- Gaertnera rotundifolia Bojer
- Gaertnera rubra C.M.Taylor
- Gaertnera schatzii Malcomber
- Gaertnera schizocalyx Bremek.
- Gaertnera sclerophylla C.M.Taylor
- Gaertnera spicata K.Schum.
- Gaertnera sralensis (Pierre ex Pit.) Kerr
- Gaertnera stictophylla (Hiern) E.M.A.Petit
- Gaertnera ternifolia Thwaites
- Gaertnera trachystyla (Hiern) E.M.A.Petit
- Gaertnera vaginans (DC.) Merr.
- Gaertnera vaginata Poir.
- Gaertnera velutina C.M.Taylor
- Gaertnera vernicosa C.M.Taylor
- Gaertnera viminea Hook.f. ex C.B.Clarke
- Gaertnera walkeri (Arn.) Blume
- Gaertnera xerophila C.M.Taylor
