= Gabbiella =

Scientific classification
- Domain: Eukaryota
- Kingdom: Animalia
- Phylum: Mollusca
- Class: Gastropoda
- Subclass: Caenogastropoda
- Order: Littorinimorpha
- Family: Bithyniidae
- Genus: Gabbiella; Prudhoe, 1989

Genus of gastropods

Gabbiella is an East African genus of small freshwater snails with an operculum, aquatic prosobranch gastropod mollusks in the family Bithyniidae.

== Species ==
Species in the genus Gabbiella include:

- Gabbiella balovalensis
- Gabbiella humerosa
- Gabbiella rosea
- Gabbiella stanleyi
