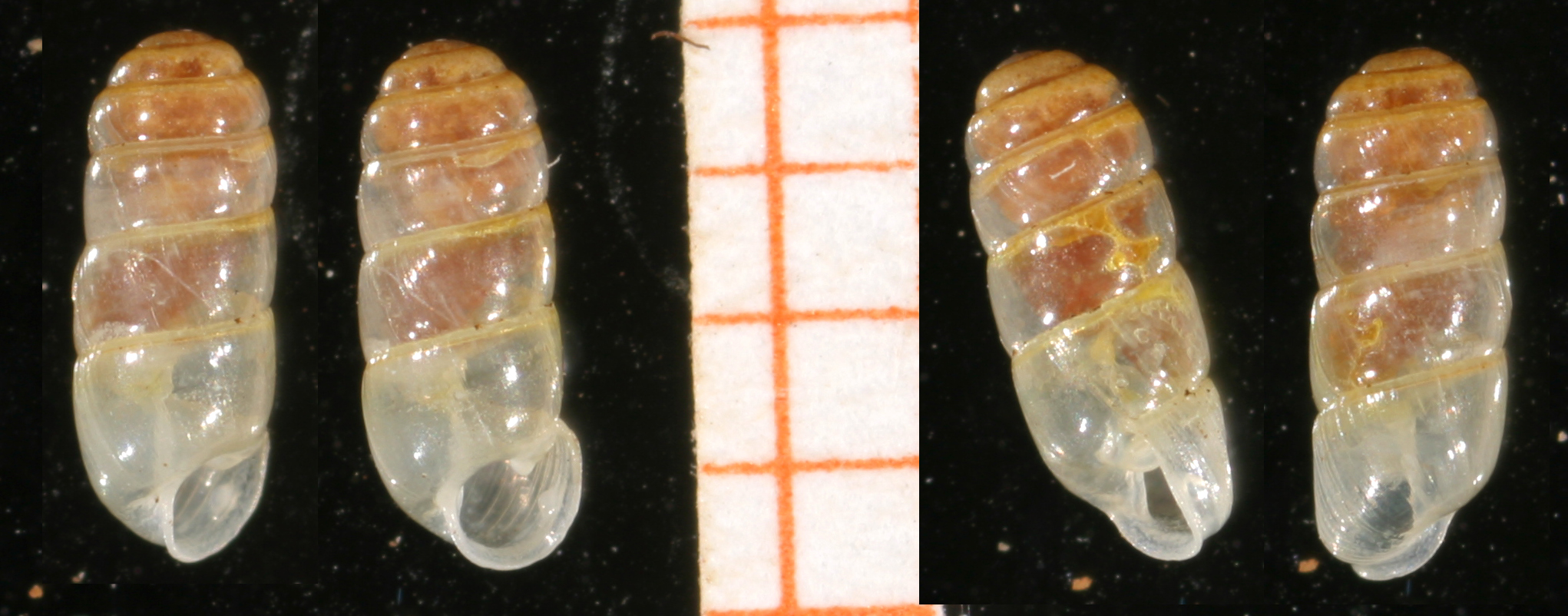
- Two different view of two shells of Gulella io

Scientific classification
- Domain: Eukaryota
- Kingdom: Animalia
- Phylum: Mollusca
- Class: Gastropoda
- Order: Stylommatophora
- Family: Streptaxidae
- Genus: Gulella
- Species: G. io

Binomial name
- Gulella io Verdcourt, 1974

= Gulella io =

Species of gastropod

Gulella io is a species of very small air-breathing land snail, a terrestrial pulmonate gastropod mollusk in the family Streptaxidae.

== Distribution ==
The non-indigenous distribution of this species includes:

- The Czech Republic as a "hothouse alien"
