= Gulella alleni =

Conservation status
- Data Deficient (IUCN 2.3)

Scientific classification
- Kingdom: Animalia
- Phylum: Mollusca
- Class: Gastropoda
- Order: Stylommatophora
- Family: Streptaxidae
- Genus: Gulella
- Species: G. alleni

Binomial name
- Gulella alleni Verdcourt, 1974

Species of gastropod

Gulella alleni is a species of very small air-breathing land snails, terrestrial pulmonate gastropod molluscs in the family Streptaxidae. This species is endemic to Tanzania.
