= Pseudovivipara manchourica =

Scientific classification
- Kingdom: Animalia
- Phylum: Mollusca
- Class: Gastropoda
- Subclass: Caenogastropoda
- Order: Littorinimorpha
- Family: Bithyniidae
- Genus: Pseudovivipara
- Species: P. manchourica

Binomial name
- Pseudovivipara manchourica (Bourguignat, 1880)

Synonyms
- Paludina striatula Benson, 1842

Species of gastropod

Pseudovivipara manchourica is a species of freshwater snail with gills and an operculum, an aquatic prosobranch gastropod mollusk in the family Bithyniidae.

== Distribution ==
This species occurs in:

- northern Vietnam,
- Shandong Province, Hunan province in China.

== Parasites ==
Pseudovivipara manchourica is a host for:

- Clonorchis sinensis
- Metorchis orientalis
- Echinochasmus japonicus

Pseudovivipara manchuourica serves as the first intermediate host for trematode Holostephanus sp. 2 and for Pleurogenidae gen. sp. 2.
