= Pseudovivipara =

Scientific classification
- Kingdom: Animalia
- Phylum: Mollusca
- Class: Gastropoda
- Subclass: Caenogastropoda
- Order: Littorinimorpha
- Family: Bithyniidae
- Genus: Pseudovivipara; Annandale, 1918

Synonyms
- Parafossarulus Annandale, 1924; Hydrobioides Annandale, 1924; Bulimus Annandale, 1924

Genus of freshwater snails

Pseudovivipara is a genus of freshwater snails in the family Bithyniidae.

== Species ==
Species within the genus Pseudovivipara include:

- Pseudovivipara aksiirensis (Tolstikova, 1979)
- Pseudovivipara anomalospiralis (Y.-Y. Liu, B.-Z. Li & T.-C. Liu, 1985)
- † Pseudovivipara crassitesta (Brömme, 1885)
- Pseudovivipara eximia (von Frauenfeld, 1864)
- Pseudovivipara globosa (Y.-Y. Liu, W.-Z. Zhang & Y.-X. Wang, 1994)
- Pseudovivipara haozhuhuensis (D.-M. Zeng & J.-M. Hu, 1982)
- † Pseudovivipara kustoides (Tolstikova, 1979) †
- † Pseudovivipara limata (S.-Z. Guan, 1987)
- Pseudovivipara longicornis (W. H. Benson, 1842)
- Pseudovivipara manchourica (Bourguignat, 1860)
- † Pseudovivipara osawaensis (Kanno, 1954) †
- † Pseudovivipara priscillae (Girotti, 1972)
- Pseudovivipara sinensis (von Möllendorff, 1888)
- Pseudovivipara spiridonovi (Zatravkin & Starobogatov, 1989)

Synonyms

- Pseudovivipara hypocrites Annandale, 1918: synonym of Pseudovivipara eximia (von Frauenfeld, 1864) (junior subjective synonym)
