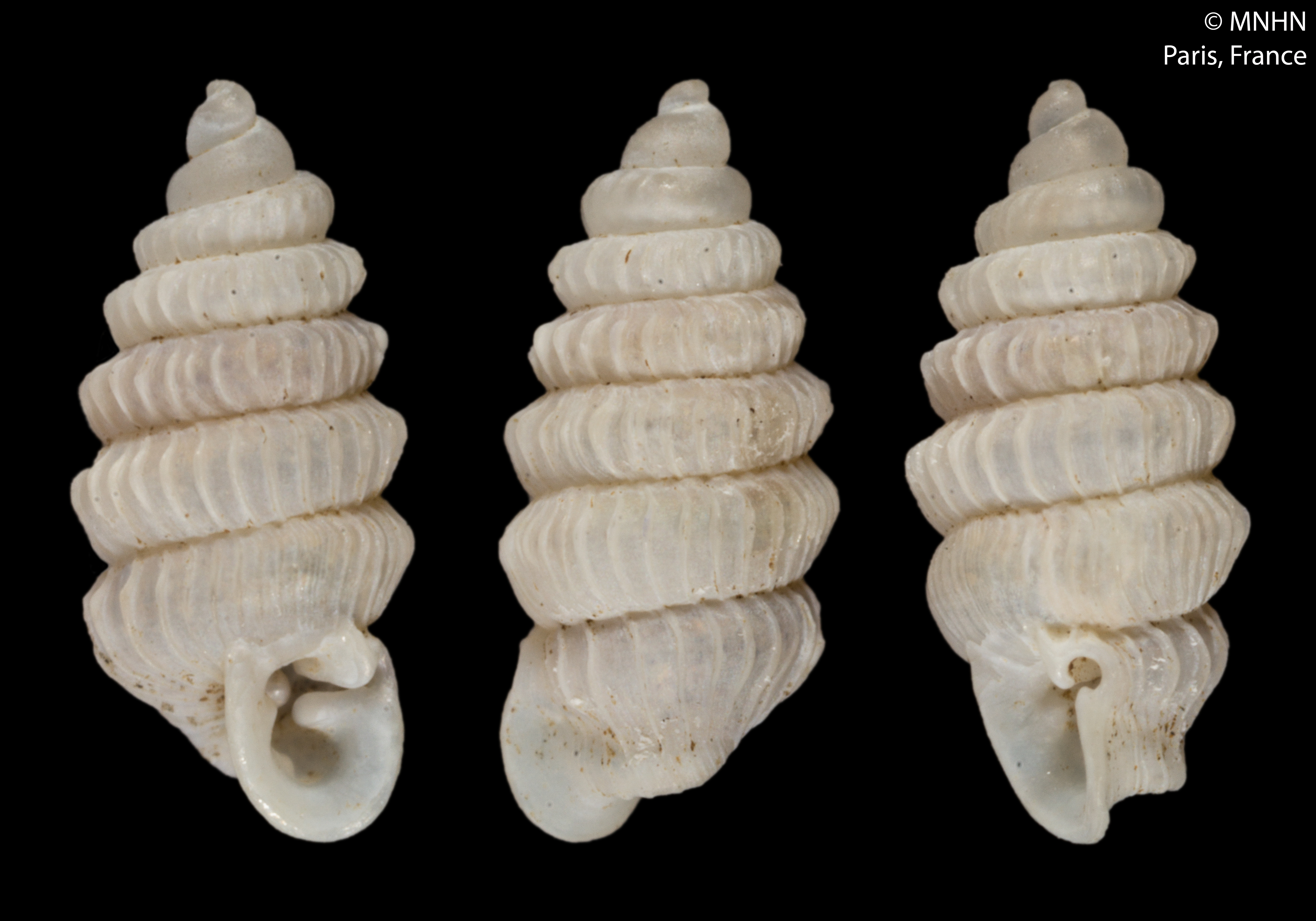
- Dadagulella delgada

Scientific classification
- Kingdom: Animalia
- Phylum: Mollusca
- Class: Gastropoda
- Order: Stylommatophora
- Family: Streptaxidae
- Genus: Dadagulella; Rowson & Tattersfield, 2013

Type species
- Dadagulella radius Muratov, 2010

Diversity
- 16 species

= Dadagulella =

Genus of snails

Dadagulella is a genus of land snails in the family Streptaxidae.

== Description ==
The shell is small to medium-sized relative to species of Gulella (2.3-5.5 mm high x 1.4-2.8 mm wide), of 4.5-8 whorls. Ovate to ovate-acuminate (maximum width being approximately at middle of shell, usually at penultimate whorl) or subconical (maximum width being in bottom third of the shell, at body whorl). Spire characteristically narrowly to broadly acuminate, occasionally coeloconoid or cyrtoconoid (spire angle 43-77°), angle varying a little within most species. Apex (i.e. top of spire) pointed in most species, but rounded in others. Sutures usually deep, shells never completely smooth-sided. Umbilicus closed or narrowly open, this sometimes varying within a species. Embryonic whorls usually smoothly granulate, with fine radial striae in two species, or irregularly punctate in another. The last part of the embryonic shell is sculptured with very fine radial striae in most (possibly all) species but these are worn away in all but the freshest individuals. Later whorls never smooth, with radial ribs (5-27 per mm on penultimate whorl) running from suture to suture, often strong and/or sinuous, lamella-like in some species. Peristome complete, or incomplete parietally, always reflected to some extent. Outer palatal surface of aperture with a depression, sometimes furrow-like, corresponding to the palatal tooth, and sometimes another corresponding to the basal tooth. Dentition 3-fold (rarely, and debatably, 2-fold) to 8-fold. Dentition consisting of at least one parietal tooth and one palatal tooth, the latter often slab-like and/or bifid, sometimes forming a parieto-palatal sinus. Usually also with one deep-set columellar baffle, folded or sub-bifid or sub-trifid in some species. Often with additional parietal, palatal, basal and/or columellar teeth or denticles. Dentition is variable in some species but the form, as well as the number, of the teeth is often consistent enough to distinguish species. Juvenile shells (known from 7-8 species) always with 3-fold to 4-fold apertural dentition except in one species, D. nictitanscomb. nov., where the only known juvenile has no teeth. In several species, some or all of the teeth in juvenile shells appear to be resorbed at intervals.

The radula contain a unicuspid central tooth and 9-15 laterals in each half-row, diminishing gradually in size laterally. Most or all laterals distinctively bicuspid or multicuspid, with outer cusps smaller or much smaller than inner cusps. Teeth are somewhat delicate and are short and flake-like at the ventral end of the radular ribbon.

Hermaphroditic duct diverticulum (talon) short, large, sausage-shaped, not convoluted. Bursa copulatrix attending albumen gland. Acini of prostate indistinct to distinct. Vagina attenuate. Oviduct often containing a single large egg. Vas deferens either thickened prior to insertion on penis, or appearing as such but actually with a diverticulum lying parallel to it. Vas deferens entering penis subapically. Penial retractor muscle branching off columellar muscle, attaching partly to vas deferens, thus sometimes bifid or nearly so. Penis elongate, tubular. Penial sheath absent, but lower part sometimes surrounded by a thin sheath-like layer contiguous with walls of lower penis. Interior of penis with weak radial pilasters and small rhombic pads, sometimes with a longitudinal pilaster or short rounded lobe. Apical part of penis with a spatulate or broad “scoop”. One end with a microscopically serrated tip, the other end deeply embedded in muscular apex of penis. Scoop usually associated with one or two large, broad hooks, lying just behind or underneath it. Scoop and hook(s) could conceivably act together as a grip or pincer. Elsewhere in penis, a longitudinal row or group of few (<40) short, simple hooks mounted on rhombic pads. “Spermatophore” (see Discussion) detected in two species: comma-shaped, lying with reservoir in vagina with longitudinally ribbed tail extending into mid penis. End of tail probably originally weakly attached to wall of penis but subsequently detached. Partially digested tail fragments present in bursa of one specimen of D. pembensis sp. nov.

== Distribution ==
The distribution of the genus Dadagulella includes the Eastern Afrotropics region.

== Species ==
Species within the genus Dadagulella include:

- Dadagulella browni (van Bruggen, 1969)
- Dadagulella conoidea (Verdcourt, 1996)
- Dadagulella cresswelli Rowson & Tattersfield, 2013
- Dadagulella cuspidata (Verdcourt, 1962)
- Dadagulella delgada (Muratov, 2010)
- Dadagulella delta Rowson & Tattersfield, 2013
- Dadagulella ecclesiola Rowson & Tattersfield, 2013
- Dadagulella frontierarum Rowson & Tattersfield, 2013
- Dadagulella meredithae (van Bruggen, 2000)
- Dadagulella minareta Rowson & Tattersfield, 2013
- Dadagulella minuscula (Morelet, 1877)
- Dadagulella nictitans (Rowson & E. Lange, 2007)
- Dadagulella pembensis Rowson & Tattersfield, 2013
- Dadagulella radius (Preston, 1910)
- Dadagulella rondoensis (Verdcourt, 1994)
- Dadagulella selene (van Bruggen & Van Goethem, 1999)
