= Boreoelona =

Scientific classification
- Kingdom: Animalia
- Phylum: Mollusca
- Class: Gastropoda
- Subclass: Caenogastropoda
- Order: Littorinimorpha
- Family: Bithyniidae
- Genus: Boreoelona; Starobogatov & Streletskaya, 1967

Genus of gastropods

Boreoelona is a genus of gastropods in the family Bithyniidae.

== Species ==
- Boreoelona caerulans (Westerlund, 1896)
- Boreoelona contortrix (Lindholm, 1909)
- Boreoelona lindholmiana (Starobogatov & Streletzkaja, 1967)
