= Gulella taitensis =

Conservation status
- Endangered (IUCN 3.1)

Scientific classification
- Kingdom: Animalia
- Phylum: Mollusca
- Class: Gastropoda
- Order: Stylommatophora
- Family: Streptaxidae
- Genus: Gulella
- Species: G. taitensis

Binomial name
- Gulella taitensis Verdcourt, 1963

Species of gastropod

Gulella taitensis is a species of very small air-breathing land snail, a terrestrial pulmonate gastropod mollusk in the family Streptaxidae.

This species is endemic to Kenya. Its natural habitat is subtropical or tropical dry forests. It is threatened by habitat loss.
