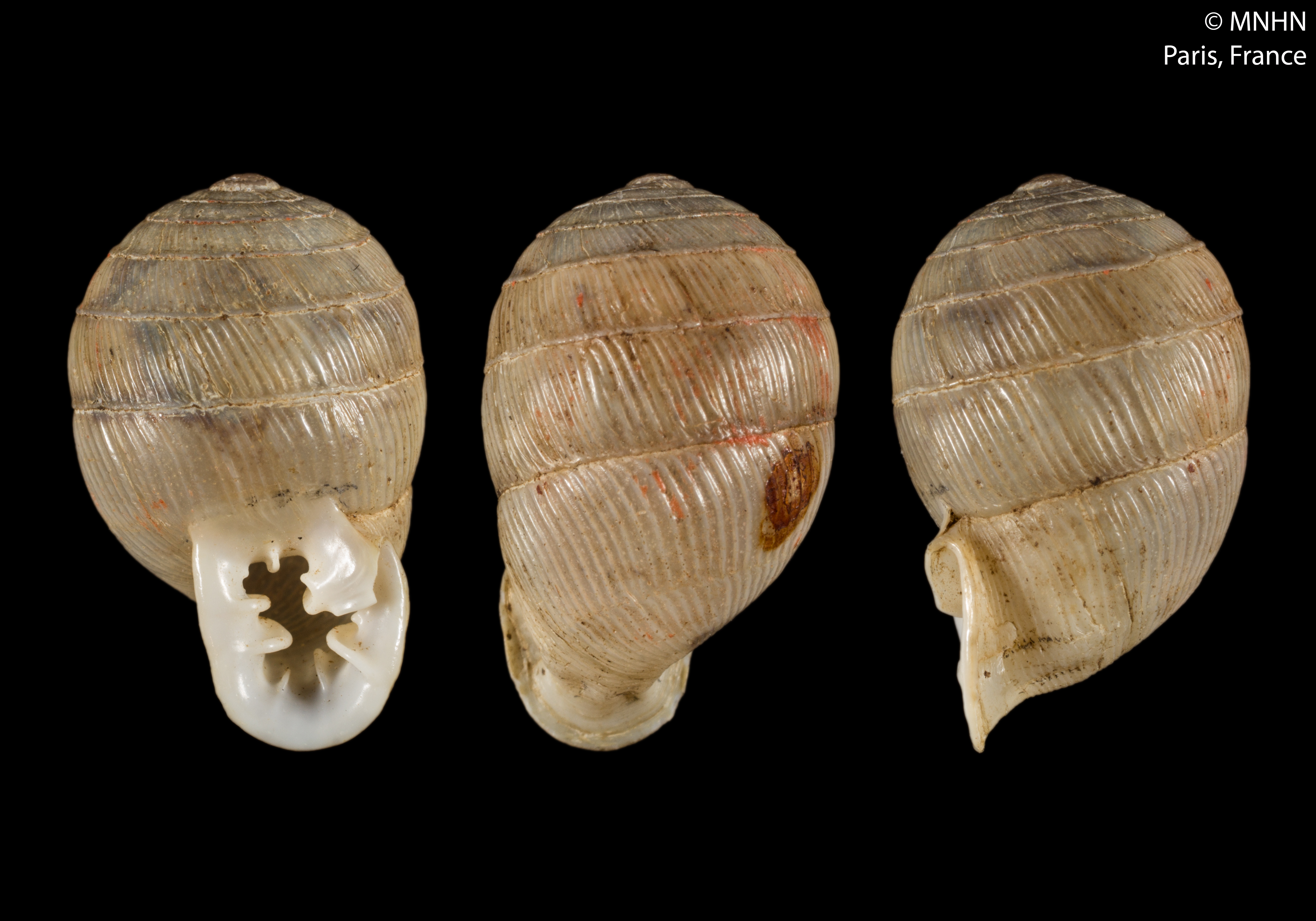
- Shell of Primigulella usagarica (syntype at MNHN, Paris)

Scientific classification
- Kingdom: Animalia
- Phylum: Mollusca
- Class: Gastropoda
- Order: Stylommatophora
- Suborder: Achatinina
- Superfamily: Streptaxoidea
- Family: Streptaxidae
- Genus: Primigulella; Möllendorff, 1887

Type species
- Ennea (Gulella) linguifera E. von Martens, 1895

Synonyms
- Aberdaria Blume, 1965 (junior synonym); Gulella (Mirigulella) Pilsbry & Cockerell, 1933 (junior synonym); Gulella (Primigulella) Pilsbry, 1919

= Primigulella =

Genus of gastropods

Primigulella is a genus of air-breathing land snails, terrestrial pulmonate gastropod mollusks in the subfamily Primigulellinae of the family Streptaxidae.

== Species ==
- Primigulella augur (van Bruggen, 1988)
- Primigulella foliifera (E. von Martens, 1895)
- Primigulella franzi (Blume, 1965)
- Primigulella grossa (E. von Martens, 1892)
- Primigulella jombeneensis (Preston, 1913)
- † Primigulella koruensis Pickford, 2019
- Primigulella linguifera (E. von Martens, 1895)
- Primigulella lobidens (Thiele, 1911)
- Primigulella microtaenia (Pilsbry & Cockerell, 1933)
- † Primigulella miocenica (Verdcourt, 1963)
- Primigulella ndamanyiluensis (Venmans, 1956)
- Primigulella ndiwenyiensis (Rowson & Lange, 2007)
- Primigulella pilula (Preston, 1911)
- Primigulella usagarica (Crosse, 1886)
- Primigulella usambarica (Craven, 1880)
