= Gabbia erawanensis =

- Apertural view of the shell of Gabbia erawanensis

Scientific classification
- Kingdom: Animalia
- Phylum: Mollusca
- Class: Gastropoda
- Subclass: Caenogastropoda
- Order: Littorinimorpha
- Family: Bithyniidae
- Genus: Gabbia
- Species: G. erawanensis

Binomial name
- Gabbia erawanensis Prayoonhong, Chitramvong & Upatham, 1990

Species of gastropod

Gabbia erawanensis is a species of freshwater snail with a gill and an operculum, an aquatic gastropod mollusk in the family Bithyniidae.

== Distribution ==
The distribution of this species includes:

- Thailand
