= Gulella planti =

Conservation status
- Least Concern (IUCN 2.3)

Scientific classification
- Kingdom: Animalia
- Phylum: Mollusca
- Class: Gastropoda
- Order: Stylommatophora
- Family: Streptaxidae
- Genus: Gulella
- Species: G. planti

Binomial name
- Gulella planti (Pfeiffer, 1856)

Species of gastropod

Gulella planti, or Plant's gulella snail, is a species of very small air-breathing land snail, a terrestrial pulmonate gastropod mollusc in the family Streptaxidae. This species is endemic to South Africa.
