= Sierraia =

Scientific classification
- Kingdom: Animalia
- Phylum: Mollusca
- Class: Gastropoda
- Subclass: Caenogastropoda
- Order: Littorinimorpha
- Family: Bithyniidae
- Genus: Sierraia; Connolly, 1929

Genus of gastropods

Sierraia is a genus of freshwater snails with an operculum, aquatic prosobranch gastropod mollusks in the family Bithyniidae.

== Species ==
Species in the genus Sierraia include:

- Sierraia expansilabrum Brown, 1988 - vulnerable, from Sierra Leone
- Sierraia leonensis Connolly, 1929 - vulnerable, from Sierra Leone
- Sierraia outambensis Brown, 1988 - critically endangered, from Sierra Leone
- Sierraia whitei Brown, 1988 - least concern, from Sierra Leone

== Distribution ==
This genus occurs in Sierra Leone.
