= Wattebledia =

- Apertural view of the shell of Wattebledia crosseana

Scientific classification
- Kingdom: Animalia
- Phylum: Mollusca
- Class: Gastropoda
- Subclass: Caenogastropoda
- Order: Littorinimorpha
- Family: Bithyniidae
- Genus: Wattebledia; Crosse, 1886

Genus of gastropods

Wattebledia is a genus of freshwater snails with a gill and an operculum, an aquatic gastropod mollusks in the family Bithyniidae.

The generic name Wattebledia is in honor of French malacologist Gustave-Éduard Joseph Wattebled (1844-1886).

== Distribution ==
The native distribution of this species includes Thailand (3 species).

== Species ==
Species in the genus Wattebledia include:

- Wattebledia baschi (Brandt, 1968)
- Wattebledia crosseana (Wattebled, 1886)
- Wattebledia siamensis (Moellendorff, 1902)
