= Gulella amaniensis =

Conservation status
- Data Deficient (IUCN 2.3)

Scientific classification
- Kingdom: Animalia
- Phylum: Mollusca
- Class: Gastropoda
- Order: Stylommatophora
- Family: Streptaxidae
- Genus: Gulella
- Species: G. amaniensis

Binomial name
- Gulella amaniensis Verdcourt, 1953

Species of gastropod

Gulella amaniensis is a species of very small air-breathing land snails, terrestrial pulmonate gastropod molluscs in the family Streptaxidae. This species is endemic to Tanzania.
