= Gulella salpinx =

Conservation status
- Critically Endangered (IUCN 3.1)

Scientific classification
- Kingdom: Animalia
- Phylum: Mollusca
- Class: Gastropoda
- Order: Stylommatophora
- Family: Streptaxidae
- Genus: Gulella
- Species: G. salpinx

Binomial name
- Gulella salpinx Herbert, 2002

Species of gastropod

Gulella salpinx, common name Trumpet-mouthed hunter snail, is a species of very small air-breathing land snail, a terrestrial pulmonate gastropod mollusk in the family Streptaxidae.

This species is endemic to Marble Delta, South Africa. Its natural habitat is subtropical or tropical dry forests. It is threatened by habitat loss.

== Ecology ==
Gulella salpinx is ovoviviparous.
