= Pseudobithynia pentheri =

Conservation status
- Near Threatened (IUCN 3.1)

Scientific classification
- Kingdom: Animalia
- Phylum: Mollusca
- Class: Gastropoda
- Subclass: Caenogastropoda
- Order: Littorinimorpha
- Family: Bithyniidae
- Genus: Pseudobithynia
- Species: P. pentheri

Binomial name
- Pseudobithynia pentheri (Sturany, 1904)

Synonyms
- Bythinia pentheri Sturany, 1904

Species of gastropod

Pseudobithynia pentheri is a species of freshwater snail with a gill and an operculum, an aquatic gastropod mollusk in the family Bithyniidae.

The specific name pentheri is in honor of malacologist Arnold Penther, who collected this species.

Peter Glöer & M. Zeki Yildrim moved the species from the genus Bythinia to the genus Pseudobithynia in 2006.

== Distribution ==
This species is endemic to Turkey.

The type locality is "Vilayet Kayseri. Soisaly 1075 m ü.M".
