= Gabbiella rosea =

Conservation status
- Near Threatened (IUCN 3.1)

Scientific classification
- Kingdom: Animalia
- Phylum: Mollusca
- Class: Gastropoda
- Subclass: Caenogastropoda
- Order: Littorinimorpha
- Family: Bithyniidae
- Genus: Gabbiella
- Species: G. rosea

Binomial name
- Gabbiella rosea Mandahl-Barth, 1968

Species of gastropod

Gabbiella rosea is a species of small freshwater snails with an operculum, aquatic prosobranch gastropod mollusks in the family Bithyniidae.

This species is endemic to Kenya. Its natural habitat is freshwater lakes.
