= Pseudobithynia =

Scientific classification
- Kingdom: Animalia
- Phylum: Mollusca
- Class: Gastropoda
- Subclass: Caenogastropoda
- Order: Littorinimorpha
- Family: Bithyniidae
- Genus: Pseudobithynia; Glöer & Pešić, 2006

Diversity
- 16 species (in this list)

Genus of gastropods

Pseudobithynia is a genus of freshwater snails with an operculum, aquatic prosobranch gastropod mollusks in the family Bithyniidae.

== Species ==
Species in the genus Pseudobithynia include:

- Pseudobithynia ambrakis Glöer, Falniowski & Pešić, 2010
- Pseudobithynia amiqensis
- Pseudobithynia euboeensis Glöer, Falniowski & Pešić, 2010
- Pseudobithynia falniowskii Glöer & Pešić, 2006
- Pseudobithynia gittenbergeri Glöer & Maassen, 2009
- Pseudobithynia hemmeni Glöer & Maassen, 2009
- Pseudobithynia irana Glöer & Pešić, 2006 - type species
- Pseudobithynia kathrinae Glöer & Bößneck, 2007
- Pseudobithynia kirka (Glöer, Albrecht & Wilke, 2007)
- Pseudobithynia levantica Glöer & Bößneck, 2007
- Pseudobithynia panetolis (Glöer, Albrecht & Wilke, 2007)
- Pseudobithynia pentheri (Sturany, 1904)
- Pseudobithynia renei (Letourneux, 1887)
- Pseudobithynia trichonis (Glöer, Albrecht & Wilke, 2007)
- Pseudobithynia westerlundii Glöer & Pešić, 2006
- Pseudobithynia zogari Glöer, Falniowski & Pešić, 2010
