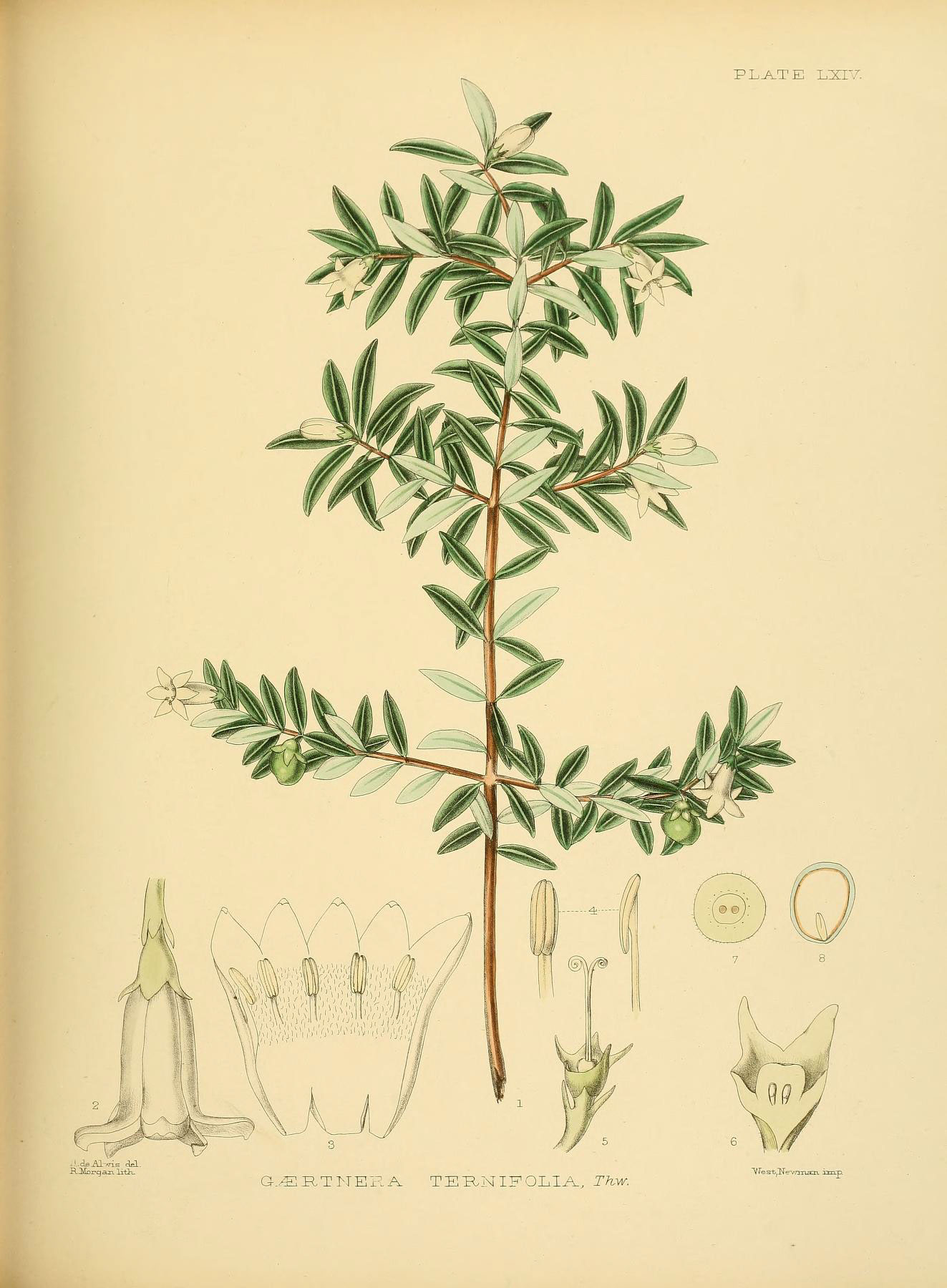

Conservation status
- Endangered (IUCN 2.3)

Scientific classification
- Kingdom: Plantae
- Clade: Tracheophytes
- Clade: Angiosperms
- Clade: Eudicots
- Clade: Asterids
- Order: Gentianales
- Family: Rubiaceae
- Genus: Gaertnera
- Species: G. ternifolia

Binomial name
- Gaertnera ternifolia Thwaites

= Gaertnera ternifolia =

Species of plant

Gaertnera ternifolia is a species of flowering plant in the family Rubiaceae. It is endemic to Sri Lanka.
