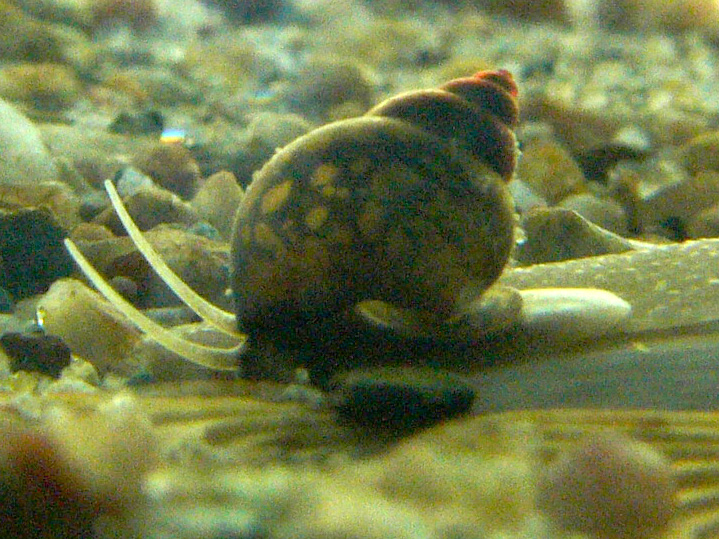
- Bithynia tentaculata

Scientific classification
- Kingdom: Animalia
- Phylum: Mollusca
- Class: Gastropoda
- Subclass: Caenogastropoda
- Order: Littorinimorpha
- Superfamily: Truncatelloidea
- Family: Bithyniidae
- Genus: Bithynia; Leach, 1818

Type species
- Helix tentaculata Linnaeus, 1758

Species
- See text

Synonyms
- Bithinia Leach, 1818 (misspelling); Bithynia (Bithynia) Leach, 1818 · accepted, alternate representation; Bithynia (Digoniostoma) Annandale, 1920 · accepted, alternate representation; Bithynia (Gabbia) Tryon, 1865 · accepted, alternate representation; †Bithynia (Pseudemmericia) Schlickum, 1968; Bulimus Scopoli, 1777 (invalid: placed on the Official Index by ICZN Opinion 475); Bulimus (Bulimus) Scopoli, 1777 (genus invalid: placed on the Official Index by ICZN Opinion 475); Bythinia Stein, 1850 (invalid: unjustified emendation of Bithynia; placed on the Official Index by ICZN Opinion 475); Digoniostoma Annandale, 1920; Digyrcidum Locard, 1882; Gabbia Tryon, 1865; Paraelona Beriozkina & Starobogatov, 1994

= Bithynia (gastropod) =

Genus of gastropods

Bithynia is a genus of small freshwater snails with an operculum, aquatic prosobranch gastropod mollusks in the family Bithyniidae.

The diploid chromosome number of Bithynia sp. from Egypt is 2n=32.

== Distribution ==
Lake Skadar with five species of Bithynia is a biodiversity hotspot of Bithynia evolution.

== Species ==
Glöer (2002) recognized four subgenera Bithynia, Codiella, Neumayria and Parafossarulus within European species. He reassigned two European extinct species of Parafossarulus into a subgenus of the genus Bithynia, but the genus Parafossarulus is generally accepted for the Asian species. The subgenus Digoniostoma is also recognized for Asian species.

Subgenera and species within the genus Bithynia include:

Subgenus Bithynia Leach, 1818

- Bithynia tentaculata (Linnaeus, 1758) - Common (or mud) bithynia - type species

Subgenus Codiella Locard, 1894

- Bithynia leachii (Sheppard, 1823)
- Bithynia transsilvanica (Bielz, 1853) - synonym: Bithynia troschelii (Paasch 1842)

Subgenus Neumayria De Stefani, 1887

- † Bithynia bavelensis Meijer, 1990

Subgenus Digoniostoma Annandale, 1920

- Bithynia funiculata Walker, 1927
- Bithynia siamensis Lea, 1856

Subgenus Incertae sedis

- Bithynia phialensis (Conrad, 1852)
- Bithynia pseudemmericia Schütt, 1964

Subgenus ?

- † Bithynia almerai Almera, 1894
- † Bithynia berthelini Depéret, 1894
- Bithynia boissieri (Küster, 1852)
- † Bithynia brusinai Halaváts, 1903
- † Bithynia budinici Brusina, 1902
- Bithynia candiota Westerlund, 1886
- Bithynia canyamelensis Altaba, 2007
- Bithynia cerameopoma (Benson, 1830)
- Bithynia cettinensis Clessin, 1887
- † Bithynia clessini Brusina, 1884
- Bithynia cretensis Glöer & Maassen, 2009
- † Bithynia croatica Pilar, 1874
- † Bithynia cyclostoma (Rousseau, 1842)
- Bithynia danubialis Glöer & Georgiev, 2012
- † Bithynia dunkeri Gude, 1913
- † Bithynia erzuruma Schütt, 1991
- Bithynia forcarti Glöer & Pešić, 2012
- † Bithynia fuchsi Willmann, 1981
- Bithynia fuchsiana (Möllendorff, 1888)
- Bithynia ghodaghodiensis Glöer & Bössneck, 2013
- † Bithynia giralanensis Oppenheim, 1919
- † Bithynia glabra (von Zieten, 1832)
- Bithynia graeca Westerlund, 1879
- Bithynia hambergerae A. Reischütz, N. Reischütz & P. L. Reischütz, 2008
- Bithynia italica (Paulucci, 1879)
- † Bithynia jurinaci Brusina, 1884
- Bithynia kobialkai Glöer & Beckmann, 2007
- † Bithynia leberonensis Fischer & Tournouër, 1873
- Bithynia lithoglyphoides (Nesemann & G. Sharma, 2007)
- Bithynia longicornis Benson - in China
- Bithynia majorcina Glöer & Rolán, 2007
- Bithynia manonellesi Altaba, 2007
- † Bithynia marasinica Andrusov, 1909
- Bithynia mazandaranensis Glöer & Pešić, 2012
- † Bithynia mediocris Ludwig, 1865
- † Bithynia minor Locard, 1878
- Bithynia misella (Gredler, 1884)
- Bithynia montenegrina Wohlberedt, 1901
- Bithynia mostarensis Möllendorff, 1873
- † Bithynia multicostata Tchernov, 1975
- Bithynia nakeae Glöer & Beckmann, 2007
- Bithynia numidica Bourguignat, 1864
- Bithynia orcula Frauenfeld, 1862
- Bithynia pauli Altaba, 2007
- Bithynia pesicii Glöer & Yildirim, 2006
- Bithynia phialensis (Conrad, 1852)
- † Bithynia phrygica (Fischer in Tchihatcheff, 1866)
- † Bithynia pilari Neumayr in Neumayr & Paul, 1875
- † Bithynia pisidica Oppenheim, 1919
- † Bithynia podarensis (Pană in Pană et al., 1981)
- † Bithynia pontica Gozhik, 2002
- Bithynia prespensis Hadžišče, 1963
- Bithynia prestoni Glöer & Bössneck, 2013
- † Bithynia protemmericia Willmann, 1981
- Bithynia pseudemmericia Schütt, 1964
- Bithynia pulchella (Benson, 1836)
- Bithynia quintanai Glöer & Beckmann, 2007
- Bithynia radomani Glöer & Pešić, 2007
- Bithynia raptiensis Glöer & Bössneck, 2013
- Bithynia reharensis Glöer & Bössneck, 2013
- Bithynia riddifordi Altaba, 2007
- † Bithynia rubella Schütt in Schütt & Besenecker, 1973
- Bithynia rubens (Menke, 1830)
- † Bithynia rumana Porumbaru, 1881
- † Bithynia sabbae Gozhik, 2002
- † Bithynia schuetti Schlickum & Strauch, 1974
- Bithynia schwabii Frauenfeld, 1865
- † Bithynia sermenazensis Depéret, 1894
- Bithynia shapkarevi Glöer, Shoreva & Slavevska-Stamenković, 2015
- Bithynia sibirica Westerlund, 1886
- Bithynia sistanica (Annandale & Prashad, 1919)
- Bithynia skadarskii Glöer & Pešić, 2007
- Bithynia starmuehlneri Glöer & Pešić, 2012
- Bithynia stenothyroides (Dohrn, 1857)
- Bithynia subbaraoi Glöer & Bössneck, 2013
- Bithynia timmii Odabaşı & Arslan, 2015
- Bithynia transsilvanica Bielz, 1853
- † Bithynia ungeri (Rolle, 1860)
- † Bithynia veneria Fontannes, 1881
- † Bithynia verneuili (Mayer, 1856)
- † Bithynia verrii de Stefani, 1880
- Bithynia vukotinovici Brusina, 1874 †
- Bithynia walderdorffii Frauenfeld, 1865
- Bithynia walkeri (Brandt, 1968)
- Bithynia yildirimi Glöer & Georgiev, 2012
- Bithynia zeta Glöer & Pešić, 2007
- † Bithynia zoranici Brusina, 1902

Synonyms:

- Bithynia badiella (Küster, 1852): synonym of Pseudobithynia badiella (Küster, 1853)
- † Bithynia bengestensis Fontannes, 1887: synonym of † Tylopoma bengestiensis (Fontannes, 1887)
- † Bithynia brusinai Halaváts, 1903: synonym of † Lithoglyphus acutus decipiens Brusina, 1885
- † Bithynia crassitesta (Brömme, 1883): synonym of † Parafossarulus crassitesta (Brömme, 1883)
- † Bithynia curta Locard, 1893: synonym of † Bithynia glabra helvetica (Wenz, 1930)
- † Bithynia gracilis Sandberger, 1875: synonym of † Bithynia glabra glabra (von Zieten, 1832)
- Bithynia hamicensis Pallary, 1939: synonym of Pseudobithynia hamicensis (Pallary, 1939)
- † Bithynia labiata Neumayr in Herbich & Neumayr, 1875: synonym of † Neumayria labiata (Neumayr in Herbich & Neumayr, 1875)
- Bithynia leachi (Sheppard, 1823): synonym of Bithynia leachii (Sheppard, 1823)
- Bithynia majewsky Frauenfeld, 1862: synonym of Bithynia tentaculata (Linnaeus, 1758)
- † Bithynia margaritula Fuchs, 1870: synonym of † Pseudamnicola (Pseudamnicola) margaritula (Fuchs, 1870)
- Bithynia narentana Locard, 1874 : synonym of Bithynia mostarensis Möllendorff, 1873
- Bithynia pentheri Sturany, 1904: synonym of Pseudobithynia pentheri (Sturany, 1904)
- Bithynia phaeacina Locard, 1887: synonym of Pseudobithynia renei (Letourneux, 1887)
- † Bithynia podwinensis Neumayr in Neumayr & Paul, 1875: synonym of † Neumayria podwinensis (Neumayr in Neumayr & Paul, 1875)
- † Bithynia proxima Fuchs, 1870: synonym of † Pseudamnicola proxima (Fuchs, 1870)
- Bithynia saulcyi Bourguignat, 1853: synonym of Pseudobithynia saulcyi (Bourguignat, 1853)
- † Bithynia scalaris Fuchs, 1877: synonym of † Bythinella megarensis Bukowski, 1896
- † Bithynia spoliata Stefanescu, 1896: synonym of † Neumayria spoliata (Stefanescu, 1896)
- Bithynia stossichiana Locard, 1894: synonym of Pseudobithynia renei (Letourneux, 1887)
- Bithynia uzielliana Issel, 1866: synonym of Gangetia uzielliana (Issel, 1866)
- † Bithynia vucotinovici Brusina, 1874: synonym of † Neumayria vukotinovici (Brusina, 1874)
- † Bithynia vukotinovici Brusina, 1874: synonym of † Neumayria vukotinovici (Brusina, 1874)

== See also ==
- Parafossarulus
