= Bithynia walkeri =

- Apertural view of the shell of Bithynia walkeri

Conservation status
- Data Deficient (IUCN 3.1)

Scientific classification
- Kingdom: Animalia
- Phylum: Mollusca
- Class: Gastropoda
- Subclass: Caenogastropoda
- Order: Littorinimorpha
- Superfamily: Truncatelloidea
- Family: Bithyniidae
- Genus: Bithynia
- Species: B. walkeri

Binomial name
- Bithynia walkeri (Brandt, 1968)

Synonyms
- Gabbia wykoffi Brandt, 1968

Species of gastropod

Bithynia walkeri is a species of freshwater snail with a gill and an operculum, an aquatic gastropod mollusk in the family Bithyniidae. It is only known from two artificial reservoirs in Suphan Buri Province.

== Distribution ==
The distribution of this species includes:

- Thailand
