= Gulella ludwigi =

Conservation status
- Data Deficient (IUCN 2.3)

Scientific classification
- Kingdom: Animalia
- Phylum: Mollusca
- Class: Gastropoda
- Order: Stylommatophora
- Family: Streptaxidae
- Genus: Gulella
- Species: G. ludwigi

Binomial name
- Gulella ludwigi Verdcourt & Venmans, 1953

Species of gastropod

Gulella ludwigi is a species of very small aerobic land snail, a terrestrial pulmonate gastropod mollusk in the family Streptaxidae. This species is endemic to Tanzania.
