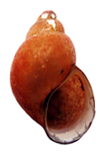
- Photo of an apertural view of a shell of Hydrobioides nassa

Scientific classification
- Kingdom: Animalia
- Phylum: Mollusca
- Class: Gastropoda
- Subclass: Caenogastropoda
- Order: Littorinimorpha
- Family: Bithyniidae
- Genus: Hydrobioides; Nevill, 1884

= Hydrobioides =

Genus of gastropods

Hydrobioides is a genus of a freshwater snails with an operculum, aquatic prosobranch gastropod mollusks in the family Bithyniidae.

Distribution of this genus includes Laos, Myanmar and Thailand.

== Species ==
- Hydrobioides nana Annandale, 1918
- Hydrobioides nassa (Theobald, 1865)
- Hydrobioides turrita Blanford, 1869 - type species
