= Pseudobithynia renei =

Conservation status
- Data Deficient (IUCN 3.1)

Scientific classification
- Kingdom: Animalia
- Phylum: Mollusca
- Class: Gastropoda
- Subclass: Caenogastropoda
- Order: Littorinimorpha
- Family: Bithyniidae
- Genus: Pseudobithynia
- Species: P. renei

Binomial name
- Pseudobithynia renei (Letourneux, 1887)

Synonyms
- Digyreidum renei Letourneux, 1887; Bithynia renei (Letourneux, 1887)

Species of gastropod

Pseudobithynia renei is a species of freshwater snail with a gill and an operculum, an aquatic gastropod mollusk in the family Bithyniidae.

== Distribution ==
The distribution of this species includes:

- Greece

The type locality is (in French language) "Marais de Cressida près Corfou", Corfu, Greece.

== Description ==
The width of the shell is 4 mm. The height of the shell is 6 mm.
