= Gulella unidentata =

Conservation status
- Data Deficient (IUCN 2.3)

Scientific classification
- Kingdom: Animalia
- Phylum: Mollusca
- Class: Gastropoda
- Order: Stylommatophora
- Family: Streptaxidae
- Genus: Gulella
- Species: G. unidentata

Binomial name
- Gulella unidentata K Pfeiffer

Species of gastropod

Gulella unidentata is a species of very small air-breathing land snail, a terrestrial pulmonate gastropod mollusc in the family Streptaxidae.

This species is endemic to Tanzania.
