= Dadagulella cuspidata =

Conservation status
- Data Deficient (IUCN 2.3)

Scientific classification
- Kingdom: Animalia
- Phylum: Mollusca
- Class: Gastropoda
- Order: Stylommatophora
- Family: Streptaxidae
- Genus: Dadagulella
- Species: D. cuspidata

Binomial name
- Dadagulella cuspidata Verdcourt, 1962

Species of gastropod

Dadagulella cuspidata is a species of very small air-breathing land snails, terrestrial pulmonate gastropod mollusks in the family Streptaxidae. This species is endemic to Tanzania.
