= Bithynia misella =

Conservation status
- Least Concern (IUCN 3.1)

Scientific classification
- Kingdom: Animalia
- Phylum: Mollusca
- Class: Gastropoda
- Subclass: Caenogastropoda
- Order: Littorinimorpha
- Family: Bithyniidae
- Genus: Bithynia
- Species: B. misella

Binomial name
- Bithynia misella (Gredler, 1884)

Synonyms
- Gabbia misella Gredler, 1884

Species of gastropod

Bithynia misella is a species of freshwater snail with a gill and an operculum, an aquatic gastropod mollusk in the family Bithyniidae.

== Distribution ==
The distribution of this species includes:

- southeastern and eastern China
- Korea
- Taiwan
- Bến Tre Province, Vietnam

== Ecology ==
Bithynia misella inhabits slow-moving waters such as pools, ponds and paddy fields.

Bithynia misella is the first intermediate host for:

- trematode Clonorchis sinensis
