= Matthew William Kemble Connolly =

British zoologist (1872–1947)

Matthew William Kemble Connolly (13 February 1872 – 24 February 1947) was a British army officer and malacologist.

== Biography ==
Connolly was born at Bath, the son of Vice-Admiral Matthew Connolly, R.N., and his wife Harriet Kemble. He was educated at Haileybury College and trained at the Royal Military College, Sandhurst. He was commissioned into the King's Own Yorkshire Light Infantry as a second lieutenant on 7 November 1891. He was promoted captain on 26 July 1899. He was appointed adjutant of the 2nd Volunteer Battalion, Royal Warwickshire Regiment on 23 April 1900, and held that position until 23 April 1905, and returned to regimental duties on 6 May. From this point much of his service was in South Africa. He was promoted major on 9 July 1910.

While in South Africa, Connolly took an interest in minerals and then started observing snails in the field. He took up malacology and conchology seriously and became an authority on the land and freshwater molluscs of South Africa. On 11 December 1912, he went onto the half-pay list as a result of ill-health arising from rheumatic fever. He retired from the army on 2 May 1914. During World War I he was employed at the army record office. He became a friend of Edgar Albert Smith, who was keeper of molluscs at the British Museum (Natural History) and recognised his worth. In 1918, Connolly became an honorary scientific worker in this museum and continued to work there until December 1946 in spite of increasing lameness.

Connolly published some fifty papers on molluscs between 1910 and 1945. He was a member of the Malacological Society from 1908 to 1938 and was president of the Conchological Society in 1930. Connolly was also a connoisseur of wine and an expert on potted meats and wrote a highly regarded pamphlet on the subject.

Connolly married Muriel Maud Vernon, daughter of Colonel Edward Vernon, J.P., D.L., of Clontarf Castle, County Dublin (1838–1913), whom he met while serving in Ireland. They lived at The Lock House, Deepcut, Surrey on the Basingstoke Canal, although Connolly was based mostly in South Kensington. Their only child was the writer and critic Cyril Connolly. Tom Pain, a younger researcher and friend of Connolly, recalled being introduced to Cyril Connolly by his father with the words "this is my son – he is a fool!"

== Bibliography and described species ==
Many specimens including types from Connolly's collection are in the Manchester Museum and also in the Natural History Museum, London and the National Museum of Wales, Cardiff.

Taxa newly described by Matthew William Kemble Connolly are listed below these works:

- Connolly M. (1910) "A survey of the South-African Stenogyrinae, with descriptions of several new species". Annals and Magazine of Natural History (8th series)6: 249–272; pl. 6 and one text fig.
- Connolly M. (1919a) "Description of four new South African land-shells, belonging to the subfamily Stenogyrinae". Records of the Albany Museum 3: 216–219; text figs.
- Connolly M. (1919b) "On Opeas strigile (M. & P.) and its allies". Proceedings of the Malacological Society of London 13: 142–144; 4 text figs.
- Connolly M. (1922a) "Diagnoses of new species of non-marine Mollusca from Portuguese Southeast Africa". Annals and Magazine of Natural History (9th series)10: 113–122.
- Connolly M. (1922b) "Notes on African non-marine Mollusca, with descriptions of many new species". Annals and Magazine of Natural History (9th series)10: 485–517; pl. 14.
- Connolly M. (1922) "The non-marine mollusca of Portuguese East Africa". Transactions of the Royal Society of South Africa, 18–220. 163
  - Rhachistia Connolly, 1922
- Connolly M. (1923a) "Notes on African non-marine Mollusca, with descriptions of many new species (cont.)". Annals and Magazine of Natural History (9th series) 11: 345–362; pl. 1 and 3 text figs.
  - Subuliniscus adjacens Connolly, 1923
- Connolly M. (1923b) "Notes on African non-marine Mollusca, with descriptions of many new species (cont.)". Annals and Magazine of Natural History (9th series) 12: 633–659; pl. 19.
- Connolly M. (1925a) "The non-marine mollusca of Portuguese East Africa". Transactions of the Royal Society of South Africa 12: 105–220; pls. 4–8.
- Connolly M. (1925b) "Notes on African non-marine mollusca, with descriptions of many new species (continued)". Annals and Magazine of Natural History (9th series) 15: 457–479; pl. 28 and 8 text figs.
- Connolly M. (1927) "Report on a small collection of Mollusca, made by Dr. G.D. Hale Carpenter, at Nagichot District, S.E. Sudan. With appendix: On Trichotoxon roccatii, by H. Watson". Proceedings of the Malacological Society of London 17: 170–174; text figs.
- Connolly M. (1928) "The Non-Marine Mollusca of Sierra Leone". Annals and Magazine of Natural History (10th series) 1: 529–551; pl. 18 and 10 text figs.
- Connolly M. (1929) "New non-marine mollusca from South Africa". Annals of the Natal Museum 6(2): 219–244; pl. 14 and 8 text figs.
- Connolly M. (1929). Annals and Magazine of Natural History (10)3: 177.
  - Sierraia Connolly, 1929
- Connolly M. (1930) "Descriptions of new mollusca from central Africa, with notes on other species". Proceedings of the Malacological Society of London 19: 37–48; pl. 6 and text figs.
- Connolly M. (1931) "Descriptions of new non-marine Mollusca from North, South, and Central Africa, with notes on other species". Annals and Magazine of Natural History (10th series) 8: 305–338; pls. 10–13 and 7 text figs.
- Trachycystis clifdeni Connolly, 1932
- Connolly M. (1938) "An apparently undescribed species of Potadoma Swainson". Journal of Conchology 21: 8; text fig.
- Connolly M. (1939) "A monographic survey of South African non-marine molluscs". Annals of the South African Museum 33: 1–660; pls. 1–19 and 58 text figs.

== Taxa named after him ==
- Lanistes connollyi Pain, 1954
