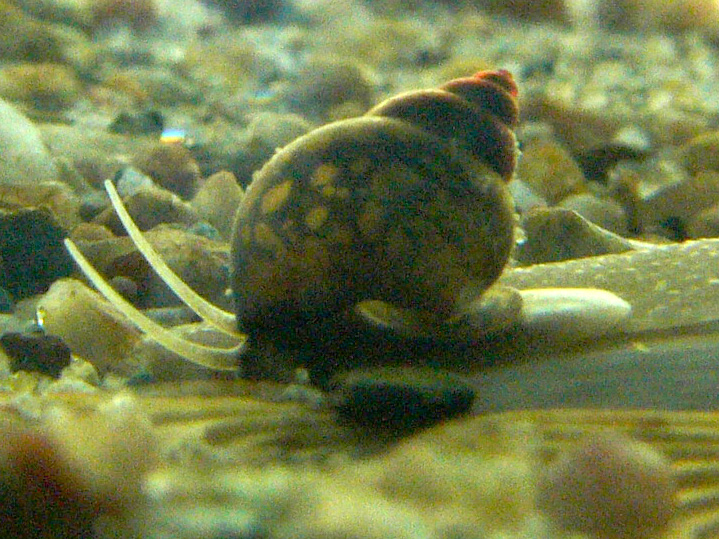
- Bithynia tentaculata

Scientific classification
- Kingdom: Animalia
- Phylum: Mollusca
- Class: Gastropoda
- Subclass: Caenogastropoda
- Order: Littorinimorpha
- Superfamily: Truncatelloidea
- Family: Bithyniidae; Gray, 1857

Genera
- See text

Diversity
- about 130 freshwater species

= Bithyniidae =

Family of gastropods

Bithyniidae is a family of small freshwater snails with an operculum, aquatic gastropod molluscs in the Littorinimorpha.

Their shells are very small and often colored. They are characterized by a calcareous operculum, a lobe on the upper surface of the neck. The ctenidium, the respiratory gill-comb, is very broad. They have a ciliary feeding habit. The kidney has a large extension towards the mantle.

== Genera ==
Genera in the family Bithyniidae include:

- Alocinna Annandale & Prashad, 1919
- Bithynia Leach, 1818 - type genus
  - Subgenus Bithynia Leach, 1818
  - Subgenus Codiella Locard, 1894
- † Celekenia Andrusov, 1902
- Boreoelona Starobogatov & Streletzkaja, 1967
- Congodoma Mandahl-Barth, 1968
- † Daciella Wenz, 1942
- Digoniostoma Annandale, 1920
- Emmericiopsis Thiele, 1928
- † Euchilus Sandberger, 1870
- † Ferebithynia Kókay, 2006
- Funduella Mandahl-Barth, 1968
- Gabbiella Mandahl-Barth, 1968
- Hydrobioides Nevill, 1884
- Incertihydrobia Verdcourt, 1958
- Jubaia Mandahl-Barth, 1968
- Limnitesta Mandahl-Barth, 1974
- Myosorella Annandale, 1919
- Neosataria Kulkarni & Khot, 2015
- Neumayria de Stefani, 1877
- Parabithynia Pilsbry, 1928
- Parafossarulus Annandale, 1924
- Pseudobithynia Glöer & Pešić, 2006
- Pseudovivipara Annandale, 1918
- Sierraia Conolly, 1929
- † Tylopoma Brusina, 1882
- Wattebledia Crosse, 1886

Genera brought into synonymy

- Bithinia Leach, 1818: synonym of Bithynia Leach, 1818
- Bulimus Scopoli, 1777: synonym of Bithynia Leach, 1818
- Bythinia Stein, 1850: synonym of Bithynia Leach, 1818
- Digyrcidum Locard, 1882: synonym of Bithynia Leach, 1818
- Gabbia Tryon, 1865: synonym of Bithynia (Gabbia) Tryon, 1865 represented as Bithynia Leach, 1818
- Paraelona Beriozkina & Starobogatov, 1994: synonym of Bithynia Leach, 1818
