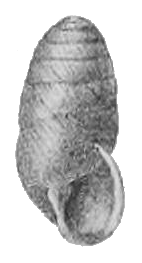
- apertural view of a shell of Edentulina moreleti

Scientific classification
- Kingdom: Animalia
- Phylum: Mollusca
- Class: Gastropoda
- Order: Stylommatophora
- Family: Streptaxidae
- Genus: Edentulina; L. Pfeiffer, 1856

Type species
- Bulimus ovoideus Bruguière, 1789

Synonyms
- Ennea (Edentulina) L. Pfeiffer, 1856 (distinct genus); Gibbus (Edentulina) L. Pfeiffer, 1856; Streptaxis (Edentulina) L. Pfeiffer, 1856

= Edentulina =

Genus of gastropods

Edentulina is a genus of air-breathing land snails, terrestrial pulmonate gastropod molluscs in the family Streptaxidae.

== Distribution ==
Distribution of the genus Edentulina include:

- East Africa
  - Tanzania
- Comoros
- the Seychelles

== Species ==
Species within the genus Edentulina include:

- Edentulina affinis Boettger, 1913
- Edentulina ambongoaboae Emberton, 1999
- Edentulina ambra Emberton, 1999
- Edentulina analamerae Emberton, 1999
- Edentulina ankaranae Emberton, 1999
- Edentulina anodon (L. Pfeiffer, 1855)
- Edentulina antankarana Emberton, 1999
- Edentulina arenicola (Morelet, 1860)
- Edentulina battistinii Fischer-Piette, Blanc, F. & Salvat, 1975
- Edentulina bemarahae Emberton, 1999
- Edentulina crosseana (Morelet, 1881)
- Edentulina dussumieri (Dufo, 1840) - subspecies: Edentulina dussumieri dussumieri (Dufo, 1840); Edentulina dussumieri reservae Gerlach & Bruggen, 1999; Edentulina dussumieri silhouettae Gerlach & Bruggen, 1999; †Edentulina dussumieri praslina Gerlach & Bruggen, 1999. The subspecies praslina is only known as subfossil.
- Edentulina florensi , 1999
- Edentulina insignis (L. Pfeiffer, 1857)
- Edentulina johnstoni (E. A. Smith, 1887)
- Edentulina langiana Pilsbry, 1919
- Edentulina liberiana (I. Lea, 1840)
- Edentulina martensi (E. A. Smith, 1882)
- Edentulina minor (Morelet, 1851)
- Edentulina moreleti (Adams, 1868)
- Edentulina nitens (Dautzenberg, 1895)
- Edentulina obesa (Taylor, 1877)
- Edentulina oleacea (Fulton, 1903)
- Edentulina ovoidea (Bruguière, 1789)
- Edentulina parensis Verdcourt, 2004
- Edentulina rugosa Emberton, 1999
- †Edentulina rusingensis Verdcourt, 1963
- Edentulina uluguruensis Bequaert & Clench, 1936
- Edentulina usambarensis Bequaert & Clench, 1936

Taxa inquirenda

- Edentulina grandidieri Bourguignat, 1890

Species brought into synonymy

- Edentulina cylindrica: synonym of Gonaxis cylindricus
- Edentulina alluaudi: synonym of Edentulina minor (junior synonym)
- Edentulina gaillardi: synonym of Edentulina minor (junior synonym)
- Edentulina glessi: synonym of Parvedentulina glessi
- Edentulina hamiltoni: synonym of Austromarconia hamiltoni
- Edentulina intermedia: synonym of Edentulina minor (junior synonym)
- Edentulina metula: synonym of Parvedentulina metula
- Edentulina montis: synonym of Edentulina minor (junior subjective synonym)
- Edentulina montium: synonym of Gulella montium
- Edentulina simeni: synonym of Parvedentulina simeni
- Edentulina stumpfii: synonym of Edentulina minor (junior synonym)
- Edentulina tumida: synonym of Edentulina ovoidea (junior synonym)
- Edentulina vitrea: synonym of Gonaxis vitreus
