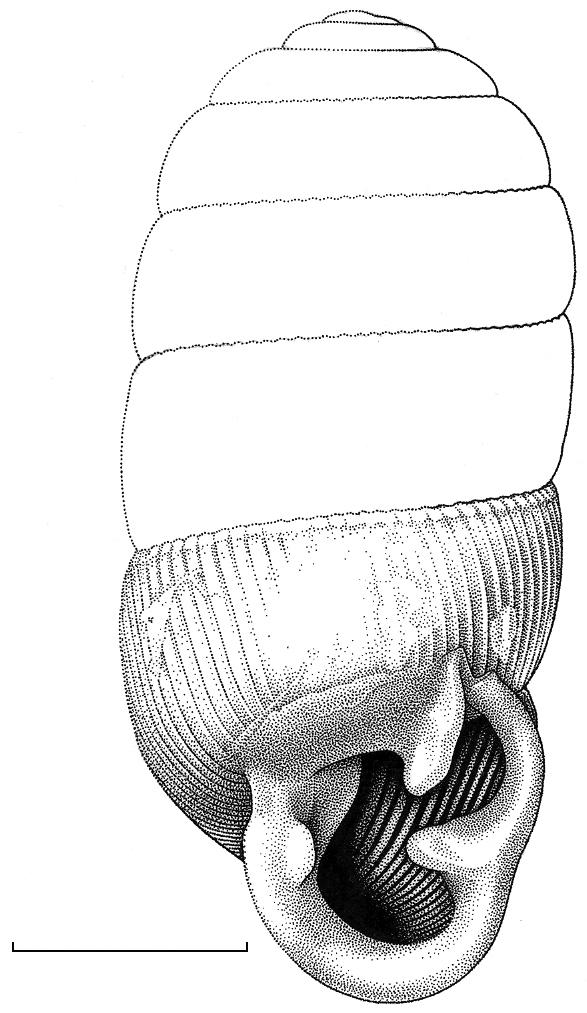
- Half-schematic drawing of the holotype shell of Gulella systemanaturae

Scientific classification
- Domain: Eukaryota
- Kingdom: Animalia
- Phylum: Mollusca
- Class: Gastropoda
- Order: Stylommatophora
- Family: Streptaxidae
- Genus: Gulella
- Species: G. systemanaturae

Binomial name
- Gulella systemanaturae Bruggen, 2008

= Gulella systemanaturae =

Species of gastropod

Gulella systemanaturae is a species of small air-breathing land snail, a terrestrial pulmonate gastropod mollusk in the family Streptaxidae.

Gulella systemanaturae was described by Adolph Cornelis van Bruggen in 2008 based on collections from 1975 in Royal Museum for Central Africa, Tervuren, Belgium and 1985 collection in Nationaal Natuurhistorisch Museum, Leiden.

The specific name systemanaturae was given in honor of the 250th anniversary of the publication of Linnaeus’ book, Systema Naturae.

== Distribution ==
The type locality is Dedza Mountain in Dedza District in South-Central Malawi.

== Shell description ==
Gulella systemanaturae is characterized by a medium-sized shell with little prominent costulation, seven to seven and three-quarter whorls and fourfold apertural dentition consisting of angular lamella, labral process, and outer and inner columellar processes; labrum sharply angulate at its point of attachment to the body whorl near the angular lamella.

The shell is medium-sized, cylindriform to subcylindriform, greatest width at about the middle of the shell, glossy and transparent when fresh, with narrowly open umbilicus to more or less rimate. Spire produced, sides straight to very slightly convex and subparallel, apex obtusely conical. Whorls seven to seven and three-quarters, very slightly convex, covered with fairly close, straight, oblique and little prominent costulae, interstices wider than (at most as wide as) costulae, smooth but with clear traces of spiral sculpture, apical whorls smooth with faint traces of spiral engraving; sutures fairly shallow to somewhat incised, crenellate. Labrum incrassate and reflected, sharply angulate at its point of attachment to the body whorl near the angular lamella. The aperture is fairly large, roughly triangular in shape, little obstructed by fourfold dentition: a strong, almost perpendicular, inrunning angular lamella, (almost) free from apex of labrum; a more or less horizontal, triangular mid-labral process, protruding as far as angular lamella, corresponding to noticeable outside depression; a small, but noticeable superficial tubercle above or on the middle of the columella; a deeply situated, little prominent, almost vertical, inside columellar process.

The width of the shell is 3.2-3.6 mm. The height of the shell is 7.1-8.2 mm. The ratio length/major diameter of shells is 2.05-2.50. The length of the last whorl is 3.7-4.2 mm. The height of the aperture is 2.4-3.0 mm. The width of the aperture is 2.1-2.5 mm. The shell has 7-7¾ whorls.

The species is particularly characterized by its double columellar processes in the apertural dentition, a splendid discriminating character in shell morphology in this group. In addition, the labrum is sharply angulate at its point of attachment to the body whorl near the angular lamella. This may be an overlooked character as this has not been checked or noticed in other taxa with similar types of shell until the type description of Gulella systemanaturae. Also, sometimes the labrum is very slightly concave where it joins the body whorl on the columellar side.

== Anatomy ==
Gulella systemanaturae has red tentacles and cream body. Other detail on anatomy is so far undescribed.

== Habitat ==
Gulella systemanaturae was found in leaf litter in Syzygium forest in the Dedza Mountain in altitudes approximately from 1700 m to 2100 m above sea level.

According to Chapman & White (1970) all localities where the Gulella systemanaturae has been found are above the Brachystegia woodland belt. Chapman & White (1970: 147-151) well described forest habitats of Dedza Mountain. The colour photo on the top of p. 34 in Dowsett-Lemaire & Dowsett (2006) gives a good impression of the area, depicting “Low-canopy montane forest near the summit of Dedza Mountain (2150 m).”. In view of the geographic position of Dedza Mountain it is not unlikely for the species to occur in neighbouring Mozambique as well.
