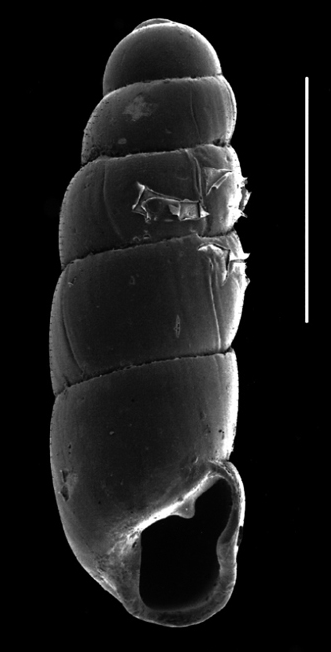
- SEM image of apertural view of paratype of Gulella streptostelopsis. The height of the shell is 2.37 mm. Scale bar is in mm.

Scientific classification
- Kingdom: Animalia
- Phylum: Mollusca
- Class: Gastropoda
- Order: Stylommatophora
- Family: Streptaxidae
- Genus: Gulella
- Species: G. streptostelopsis

Binomial name
- Gulella streptostelopsis Bruggen, 2007
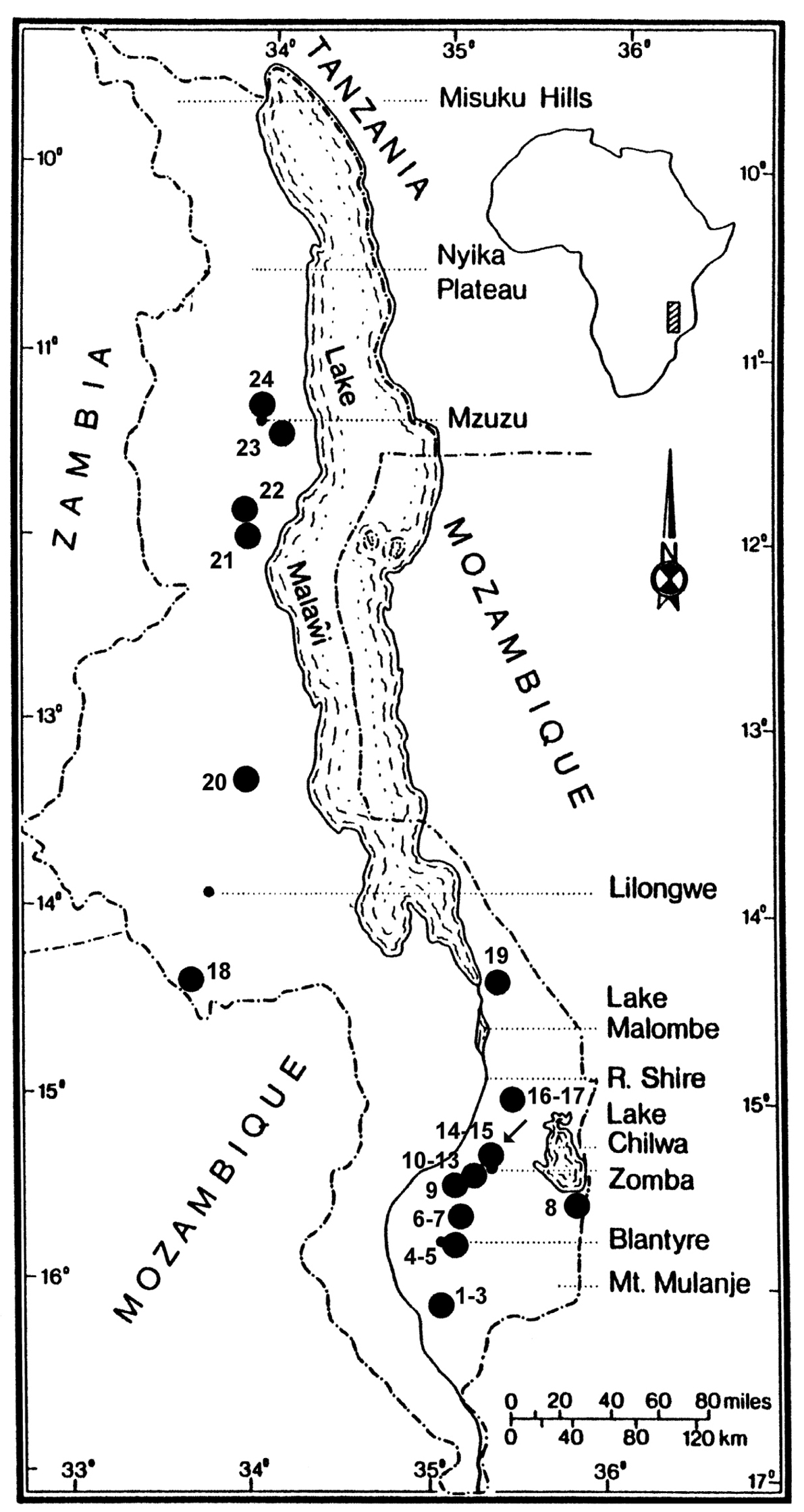
- Map of Malawi showing distribution of Gulella streptostelopsis. The arrow indicates the type locality.

= Gulella streptostelopsis =

Species of gastropod

Gulella streptostelopsis is a species of small air-breathing land snail, a terrestrial pulmonate gastropod mollusk in the family Streptaxidae.

Gulella streptostelopsis was described by Adolph Cornelis van Bruggen in 2007 based on material (except for one specimen) obtained for the National Museum of Natural History in Leiden (Nationaal Natuurhistorisch Museum, formerly Rijksmuseum van Natuurlijke Historie) by Ms H.M. Meredith (Newquay, U.K.; formerly Malawi) and her co-workers in the period 1975–1988.

The minute, almost smooth, shell (length 2.0-2.4 mm) resembles that of the genus Streptostele, but is characterized by three-fold apertural dentition and just under six whorls. This taxon may represent a new genus.

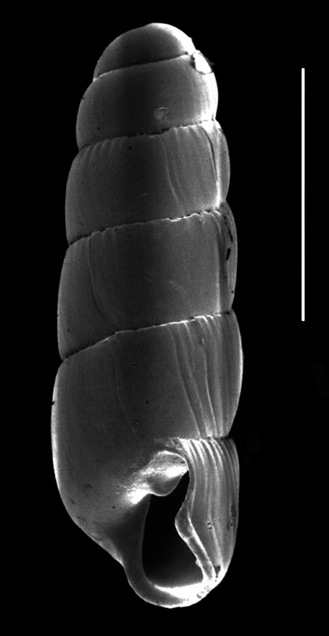
Lateral view of the shell.

== Etymology ==
The specific name streptostelopsis is of the resemblance of Streptostele. It is Latinized Greek for Streptostele-like and refers to the likeness to shells of the streptaxid genus Streptostele. The kindred epithet streptosteloides already exists in the family Streptaxidae. The original combination was Opeas streptosteloides Von Martens, 1897, but this taxon appears to be a streptaxid, now named Streptostele streptosteloides (Von Martens, 1897). In view of the similarity of the names and probable causes for confusion in possibly closely allied genera the epithet streptostelopsis was proposed.

== Distribution ==
This minute land snail lives at series of localities of mainly between 1000 and 1500 m a.s.l. in Malawi south of about 11°S. Bruggen (2007) presumed, that this almost certainly is not a Malawi endemic. Many localities are sufficiently close to the borders of at least Zambia and Mozambique to predict occurrence in those countries, particularly as suitable habitat is available there.

It has been reported from Pemba Island, Tanzania in 2010.

== Shell description ==
Gulella streptostelopsis is a minute species of Gulella s.l., with more or less tapering, almost smooth, shell about three times as long as wide and with three-fold apertural dentition consisting of single angular, labral and columellar processes. This species is generally easily recognized because of its small size and Streptostele-like shell.

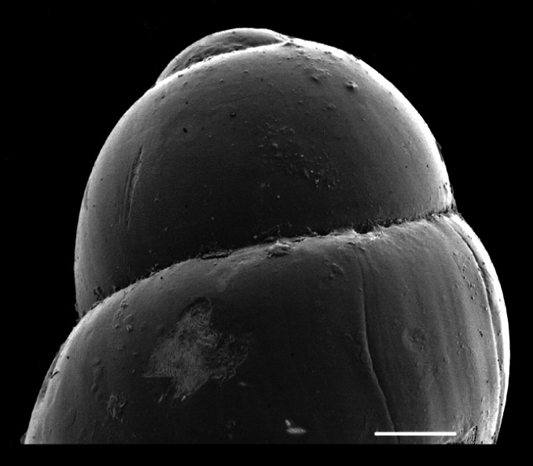
Apex.

The shell is small to minute, clavate, more or less tapering, greatest width well below the middle, always more than two-and-a-half times as long as wide, transparent when fresh to whitish when worn. The umbilicus is completely closed. The spire is produced, slightly tapering or sides at most subparallel, not convex. The apex is flattened, obtusely conical to mamillate. The shell has from five-and-a-half to just under six hardly convex whorls, that are superficially smooth but under high magnification with faint spiral sculpture and growth lines, growth lines turning to weak costulation behind the labrum. Sutures are somewhat impressed, fairly shallow, simple and filiform. The aperture is subovate, sometimes distinctly squarish at base, peristome slightly incrassate and reflected, aperture not or hardly obstructed by three-fold dentition: a small angular process (usually a mere swelling), somewhat distant from and therefore not connected with apex of labrum so that there is no sinus; opposite the angular denticle there is an upper labral process in the form of a thickening of the labrum, which process does not correspond to a depression behind the labrum; finally, a very faint thickening of the lower columella may be interpreted as a columellar process.

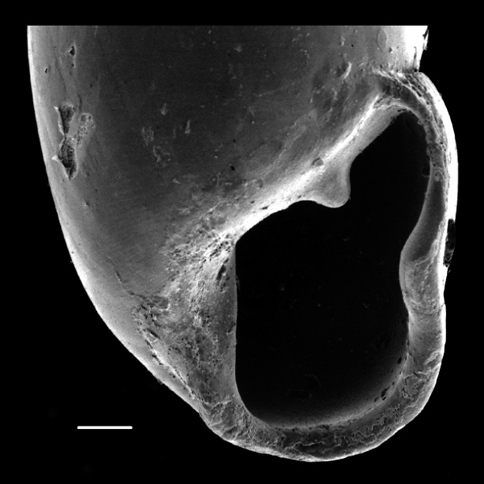
Aperture.

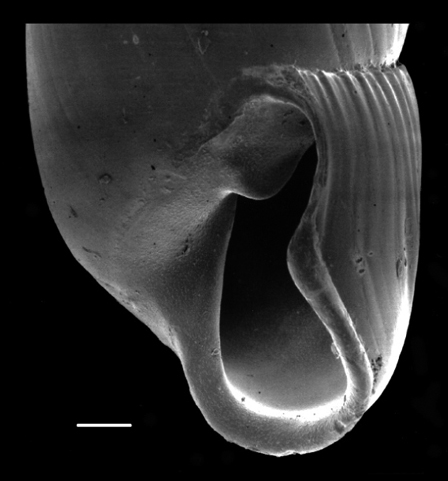
Lateral view of aperture.

Measurements of shell: 2.00-2.37 × 0.75-0.81 mm, l/d 2.62-3.17, lw 0.87-1.00 mm, aperture height × major diameter 0.56-0.62 × 0.44-0.50 mm, 5½->5¾ whorls. Holotype shell 2.31 × 0.78 mm, l/d 2.96, lw 1.00 mm, aperture 0.69 × 0.44 mm, >5¾ whorls. Mean values 2.18 × 0.78 mm, l/d 2.89, lw 0.93, aperture 0.59 × 0.47 mm, average values 2.19 × 0.75 mm, l/d 2.92, lw 0.94, aperture 0.59 × 0.44 mm (n = 38).

Animal so far undescribed. Some alcohol material of this species is available and should be properly evaluated, but this would involve micro-anatomy.
