= Eric Sidney Higgs =

British archaeologist

Eric Sidney Higgs (1908–1976) was the founder of the "Cambridge Palaeoeconomy School", which focused on the economic aspects of archaeology. His name is closely connected with a process known as "Site Catchment Analysis".

== Life on a farm ==
Eric Higgs attended the London School of Economics in the late 1920s, taking the BSc degree. He continued to live in London, but in the late 1930s became increasingly dissatisfied with urban life, buying a small Shropshire farm in 1939.

== Becoming an archaeologist ==
In 1953, frustrated by the many rules that surrounded post-war food production, Higgs sold his farm, and undertook a major career change, entering Cambridge University to read the post-graduate diploma in archaeology that was then offered. Here he founded a department with new ideas under Professor Grahame Clark, who had recently excavated the site of Star Carr in Yorkshire, and had published his highly influential Prehistoric Europe: the Economic Basis. With his farm experience, Higgs fitted neatly into this new, ecologically minded school of thought. He worked in Libya with Charles McBurney, digging at the cave of Haua Fteah in Cyrenaica. He subsequently worked on the faunal remains back in Cambridge, assisted by the much-respected lab technician, Don Allen. This investigation became the focus of a series of influential papers on the Haua Fteah faunal sequence, specifically examining the relationship between the animal bones identified there and the environmental setting of the site.

=== The faunal sequence ===
Traditionally, the species found and changes in their proportions had been interpreted as a reflection of changes in the environment. However, in his study of the fauna from the site of Ksar Akil in Lebanon, the palaeontologist D.A. Hooijer dismissed fluctuations in faunal percentages as no more than the "hunter's choice" and the bones as reflecting no more than the "palaeolithic menu". His main reason lay in the differences between the fauna of Ksar Akil and that of the Wadi Maghareh caves, only 200 km to the south (Garrod and Bate 1939). Higgs took marked exception to this, firmly rejecting the "menu' hypothesis. He showed that the environments at each site were wholly different. The steep mountains of the Lebanese coastal region supported the wild goats and deer found at Ksar Akil, and this contrasted sharply with the setting at Mount Carmel, where the low, steppic hinterland supported mainly gazelle, the bones of which predominated:

"There appear to be two possible interpretations to account for the fluctuations in the relative proportions of the main food animals in the cave; first, that they are due to environmental changes, or, secondly, that they are due to changes in hunting fashions".

Higgs argued that long-term trends reflected the most effective adaptation by the human groups living there, subject to the limitations of the prevailing technology, and thus the faunal remains will reflect the setting of the site. His papers remain a lucid and important exposition of climatic change within the Mediterranean basin, and the factors that underlay the hunters' decisions.

== Field explorations in Greece ==
Beginning in 1962, Higgs undertook field explorations in Epirus, establishing for the first time a well-dated presence for the Palaeolithic era in Greece. The first site he discovered was the open-air site of Kokkinopilos in the Louros Valley, with Middle Palaeolithic artefacts eroding out of heavily dissected red sediments. These were excavated in 1963 and 1964 in collaboration with archaeologist Sotiris Dakaris, then serving as the Ephor of Antiquities. This was followed by excavations at the rock shelter of Asprochaliko, further up the Louros Valley, from 1964 to 1966 (Dakaris and Higgs 1964, Higgs 1966). Higgs' excavations at Kokkinopilos were visited by the novelist Hammond Innes, and Higgs emerges thinly disguised among the characters in Innes' novel Levkas Man. In 1966 and 1967 he excavated at the Kastritsa Cave, located on Lake Pamvotis near the provincial capital of Ioannina (Higgs et al. 1967, Bailey 1967). Each site was shown to have a lengthy sequence of occupation (at Asprochaliko beginning in the Middle Palaeolithic period) and extending to the end of the ice age. In his earlier studies of Mediterranean faunas, Higgs had considered an area of 40 km radius as the likely hunting territory from a site. The publications of R.B. Lee and others (Lee and DeVore 1968), in which the behaviour of living hunters had been followed in detail, showed that the majority of forays were of a much lesser extent. For farming societies, the main arable resource was usually at an even lesser distance (Chisholm 1962).

== Site Catchment Analysis ==
During his work at the sites in Greece with the geologist Claudio Vita-Finzi, Higgs began to think more about the nature of occupation at each site, restricted as they were by settings within a steep gorge (at Asprochaliko) or at a lakeside (Kastritsa). Higgs and Vita-Finzi developed a method to evaluate the setting of each site in a process that became known as "Site Catchment Analysis", later modified to "Site Territorial Analysis". This sought to define the limits of accessibility of land and resources around a settlement site, usually on the basis of a time-distance model measured by walking, recording the extent of the different land forms and soil types. From the first investigations in Greece, this model was then extended to Natufian sites in Israel, often mooted as the homes of early farming innovations. The "site catchment" investigations showed that these sites had a diversity of landforms and soils that were much more suited to hunting than to farming, and that true early farming sites were located elsewhere.

This model has been widely criticised within the framework of both processual archaeology and post-processual archaeology, in which the interpretation of social concerns is paramount, beyond the strict needs of subsistence.

== Director at Cambridge and later work ==
Soon after his graduation from his Diploma studies, Higgs was appointed as 'Assistant Director of Research' within the Department of Archaeology at Cambridge, a post he held to retirement. In the later 1950s he worked with Charles McBurney in the excavation of upper Paleolithic caves in Britain. During one season there, Higgs had a severe heart attack which left him unwell for the rest of his life.

During the time the Department of Archaeology was divided into two factions — the flint typology faction under McBurney and the bone and seed faction under Higgs, who was infamous for playing favourites — individual paths and meritocracy were almost unheard of at Cambridge. Higgs's approach was typical of the old establishment of teachers. Students who disagreed with his choosing their path of study were gatekept from advancing in the university structures.

https://archaeologydataservice.ac.uk/archives/view/assemblage/html/4/4halst4.html

In 1968 he was the joint winner of the Rivers Memorial Medal, presented by the Royal Anthropological Institute.

== Sources ==
- G.N. Bailey, Klithi: Palaeolithic Settlement and Quaternary Landscapes in Northwest Greece. 2 vols. McDonald Institute for Archaeological Research (1998) ISBN 0-95194-202-6
- Michael Chisholm, Rural Settlement and Land Use, Hutchinson (1962), Aldine (2007) ISBN 0-202-30914-2
- Grahame Clark, Prehistoric Europe: The Economic Basis, Methuen (1952)
- Sotiris Dakaris, Higgs and R.W. Hey (with contributions by H. Tippett and Paul Mellars). (1964) The Climate, Environment and Industries of Stone Age Greece: Part I, "Proceedings of The Prehistoric Society" 30, 199–244.
- René Dumont, Types of Rural Economy, Methuen (1970) ISBN 0-416-18280-1
- Dorothy Garrod and Dorothea Bate, The Stone Age of Mount Carmel, Oxford (1937)
- Dirk Albert Hooijer, The Fossil Vertebrates of Ksar Akil, a Paleolithic Rock-Shelter in the Lebanon, "Zoologische Verhandelingen", 1961, 49, 1.
- Hammond Innes, Levkas Man, Ballantine (1971) ISBN 0-345-27410-5
- Richard B. Lee and Irven DeVore, Man the Hunter, Aldine-de Gruyter (1999) ISBN 0-202-33032-X
