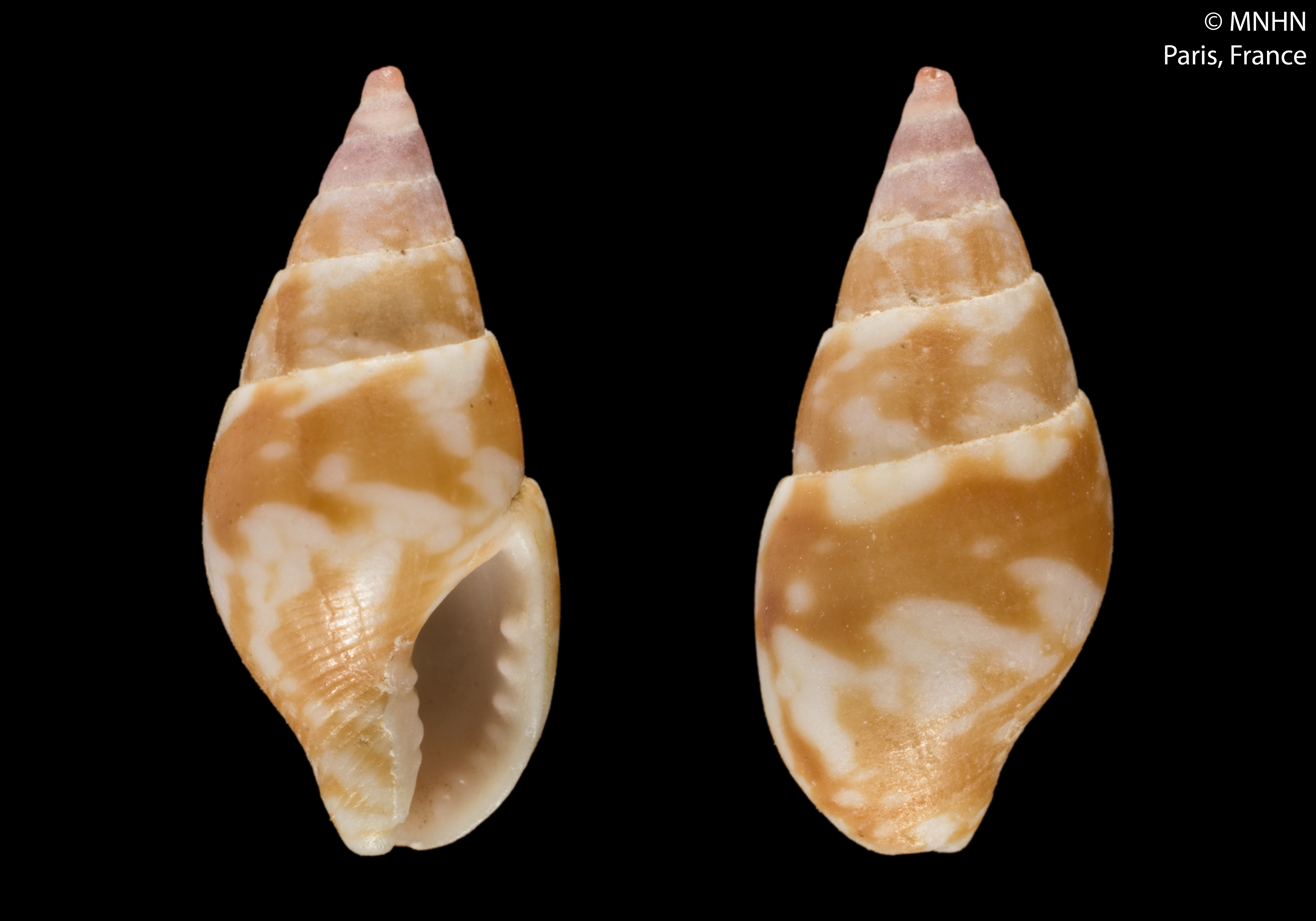

Scientific classification
- Kingdom: Animalia
- Phylum: Mollusca
- Class: Gastropoda
- Subclass: Caenogastropoda
- Order: Neogastropoda
- Family: Columbellidae
- Genus: Mitrella
- Species: M. bruggeni

Binomial name
- Mitrella bruggeni van Aartsen, Menkhorst & Gittenberger, 1984

= Mitrella bruggeni =

Species of gastropod

Mitrella bruggeni is a species of sea snail in the family Columbellidae, the dove snails. The specific name bruggeni is in honor of Dutch malacologist Adolph Cornelis van Bruggen. It was created as a new name for Mitrella broderipi auct. not Sowerby, 1844.
