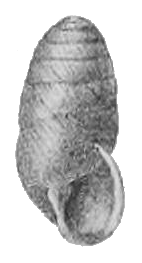
- An apertural view of a shell of the species

Scientific classification
- Domain: Eukaryota
- Kingdom: Animalia
- Phylum: Mollusca
- Class: Gastropoda
- Order: Stylommatophora
- Family: Streptaxidae
- Genus: Edentulina
- Species: E. moreleti

Binomial name
- Edentulina moreleti (Adams, 1868)

Synonyms
- Gibbus (Gibbulina) Moreleti Adams, 1868; Pupa Moreleti; Ennea (Edentulina) Moreleti; Ennea moreleti

= Edentulina moreleti =

Species of gastropod

Edentulina moreleti is a species of air-breathing land snail, a terrestrial pulmonate gastropod mollusc in the family Streptaxidae.

== Distribution ==
Edentulina moreleti is endemic to the Seychelles.

The type locality for this species is Silhouette Island. It also occurs on Mahé. Up to 1999 there were only 34 known specimens in collections.

== Description ==
The species gives live birth rather than laying eggs. The newborn snails are yellow in color. Juvenile snails are also yellow with crimson tentacles. Adult snails are dark brown, but Martens (1898) described the body as red.

The reproductive anatomy and radula have been described by J. Gerlach & A. C. van Bruggen (1999). The formula of the radula is 29 + 1 + 29. Salivary glands are bilobed.

The color of the shell is a tan brown. The width of the shell is 5.3-6.5 mm. The height of the shell is 11.0-14.0 mm. The shape of the shell is bulimoid. The shell has 6.75-7.75 whorls. There is no spiral sculpture on the shell.

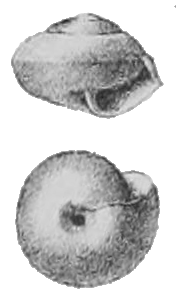
juvenile shell

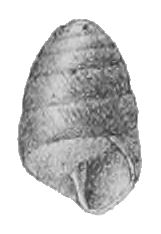
subadult shell

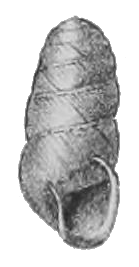
adult shell

The only other species of Edentulina on the Seychelles is Edentulina dussumieri, which is the most abundant streptaxid snail there. Edentulina moreleti is smaller than Edentulina dussumieri which is over 14 mm in shell height, and Edentulina dussumieri has spiral sculpture on the shell.

== Ecology ==
Edentulina moreleti inhabits habitats with high humidity and with many Dracaena reflexa plants. The population density of this species is low: about 160 individuals at locality area of 2 ha. Edentulina moreleti is ovo-viviparous.

Edentulina moreleti is the only known herbivorous streptaxid. Other Streptaxidae are carnivorous. Edentulina moreleti probably feeds on algae and decomposing plants, that occur on leaves of Dracaena reflexa. They can be fed with carrot, apple and decomposing leaves in captivity.
