= Glabrennea =

Scientific classification
- Kingdom: Animalia
- Phylum: Mollusca
- Class: Gastropoda
- Order: Stylommatophora
- Family: Streptaxidae
- Genus: Glabrennea

Genus of gastropods

Glabrennea is a genus of air-breathing land snails, a group of terrestrial pulmonate gastropod mollusks in the family Streptaxidae.

== Distribution ==
The distribution of the genus Glabrennea includes:

- the Seychelles

== Species ==
Species within the genus Glabrennea include:

- Glabrennea gardineri (Sykes, 1909)
- Glabrennea silhouettensis (Verdcourt, 1994)
- Glabrennea thomasseti (Sykes, 1909)
