= Priodiscus serratus =

Conservation status
- Vulnerable (IUCN 3.1)

Scientific classification
- Kingdom: Animalia
- Phylum: Mollusca
- Class: Gastropoda
- Order: Stylommatophora
- Family: Streptaxidae
- Genus: Priodiscus
- Species: P. serratus

Binomial name
- Priodiscus serratus (Adams, 1868)

Species of gastropod

Priodiscus serratus is a species of air-breathing land snail, a terrestrial pulmonate gastropod mollusk in the family Streptaxidae.

== Distribution ==
The distribution of Priodiscus serratus includes:

- Seychelles
