= Bruggennea =

Scientific classification
- Kingdom: Animalia
- Phylum: Mollusca
- Class: Gastropoda
- Order: Stylommatophora
- Family: Streptaxidae
- Subfamily: Enneinae
- Genus: Bruggennea; Dance, 1972

Genus of gastropods

Bruggennea is a genus of air-breathing land snails, terrestrial pulmonate gastropod mollusks in the family Streptaxidae.

The generic name Bruggennea is in honor of Dutch malacologist Adolph Cornelis van Bruggen.

== Distribution ==
The distribution of the genus Bruggennea includes:

- Kalimantan, Indonesia

== Species ==
Species within the genus Bruggennea include:

- Bruggennea luminifera
- Bruggennea bongi
- Bruggennea laidlawi
