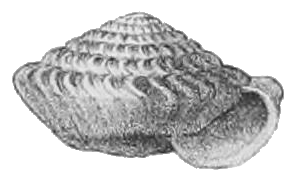
- apertural view of a shell
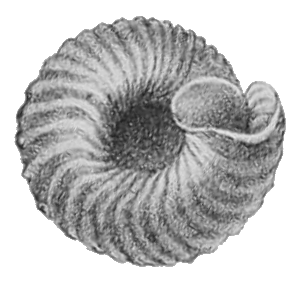
- Umbilical view of a shell

Conservation status
- Endangered (IUCN 3.1)

Scientific classification
- Kingdom: Animalia
- Phylum: Mollusca
- Class: Gastropoda
- Order: Stylommatophora
- Family: Streptaxidae
- Subfamily: Orthogibbinae
- Genus: Careoradula; Gerlach & van Bruggen, 1999
- Species: C. perelegans

Binomial name
- Careoradula perelegans (Martens, 1898)

Synonyms
- Streptaxis (Imperurbatia) perelegans Martens, 1898; Imperturbatio perelegans; Imperturbatia perelegans

= Careoradula =

Species of gastropod

Careoradula perelegans is a species of air-breathing land snail, terrestrial pulmonate gastropod mollusk in the family Streptaxidae.

Careoradula perelegans is the only species in the genus Careoradula.

The generic name Careoradula consist of Latin word "careo", that means "lacking" and the word radula.

== Distribution ==
Careoradula perelegans is endemic to the Seychelles.

== Description ==
The shape of the shell is discoidal. The shell has 6–8 whorls. there are regular ribs on the shell. The umbilicus is open.

The width of the shell is 4.4–6.1 mm. The height of the shell is 1.9–3.1 mm.

The body color is pale yellow.

Digestive system: Careoradula perelegans is unique among other streptaxids, because it has no radula, no odontophore and no retractor muscles associated with these structures. It is the first known terrestrial mollusc and first pulmonate gastropod without radula. Instead of this, the Careoradula perelegans has strong muscular ridges between mouth and oesophagus.

== Ecology ==
Careoradula perelegans feeds on carrion. It has been recorded to feed on dead snail Subulina octona. It evert an extensive rostrum, that is available in all carnivorous gastropods on the anterior part of the oesophagus, and it uses only muscular peristaltics instead of rasping by radula.
