= Imperturbatia violescens =

Conservation status
- Endangered (IUCN 3.1)

Scientific classification
- Kingdom: Animalia
- Phylum: Mollusca
- Class: Gastropoda
- Order: Stylommatophora
- Family: Streptaxidae
- Genus: Imperturbatia
- Species: I. violescens

Binomial name
- Imperturbatia violescens (Martens, 1898)

Species of gastropod

Imperturbatia violescens is a species of air-breathing land snail, terrestrial pulmonate gastropod mollusk in the family Streptaxidae.

Gerlach & Bruggen (1999) have spelled the specific name as Imperturbatia violascens.

This species is endemic to the Seychelles.
