= Glabrennea thomasseti =

Conservation status
- Critically Endangered (IUCN 3.1)

Scientific classification
- Kingdom: Animalia
- Phylum: Mollusca
- Class: Gastropoda
- Order: Stylommatophora
- Family: Streptaxidae
- Genus: Glabrennea
- Species: G. thomasseti

Binomial name
- Glabrennea thomasseti (Sykes, 1909)

Synonyms
- Gulella thomasseti (Sykes, 1909)

Species of land snail

Glabrennea thomasseti is a species of the air-breathing land snail, a terrestrial pulmonate gastropod mollusk in the family Streptaxidae.

Its natural habitat is subtropical or tropical moist lowland forests. It is threatened by habitat loss.

== Distribution ==
Glabrennea thomasseti is endemic to the Mahé Island in the Seychelles.
