= Payena lamii =

Conservation status
- Endangered (IUCN 3.1)

Scientific classification
- Kingdom: Plantae
- Clade: Tracheophytes
- Clade: Angiosperms
- Clade: Eudicots
- Clade: Asterids
- Order: Ericales
- Family: Sapotaceae
- Genus: Payena
- Species: P. lamii

Binomial name
- Payena lamii A.Bruggen

Species of tree

Payena lamii is a tree in the family Sapotaceae. It is named for the Dutch botanist Herman Johannes Lam.

== Description ==
Payena lamii grows up to 15 metres (50 ft) tall with a trunk diameter of up to 20 cm (8 in). The inflorescences bear up to ten flowers. The fruits are ellipsoid and measure up to 3 cm (1.2 in) long.

== Distribution and habitat ==
Payena lamii is endemic to Borneo, where it is known only from Sarawak. Its habitat is swamp and kerangas forests to 250 m (800 ft) elevation.

== Conservation ==
Payena lamii has been assessed as endangered on the IUCN Red List. It is at risk from conversion of its habitat for palm oil plantations. The species is present in Kubah National Park, which affords it a level of protection there.
