= Payena gigas =

Conservation status
- Least Concern (IUCN 3.1)

Scientific classification
- Kingdom: Plantae
- Clade: Tracheophytes
- Clade: Angiosperms
- Clade: Eudicots
- Clade: Asterids
- Order: Ericales
- Family: Sapotaceae
- Genus: Payena
- Species: P. gigas

Binomial name
- Payena gigas A.Bruggen

Species of tree

Payena gigas is a tree in the family Sapotaceae.

It grows up to 40 metres (130 ft) tall with a trunk diameter of up to 105 centimetres (40 in). The bark is greyish to brown. Inflorescences bear up to eight flowers. The fruits are ovoid, up to 4.5 cm (2 in) long. The specific epithet gigas is from the Greek meaning 'giant', referring to the tree's large size.

P. gigas is endemic to Borneo and known only from Sabah. Its habitat is hill mixed dipterocarp forests to lower montane forests from 850 metres (2,800 ft) to 1,220 metres (4,000 ft) elevation.
