= Adolph Cornelis van Bruggen =

Dutch biologist (1929–2016)

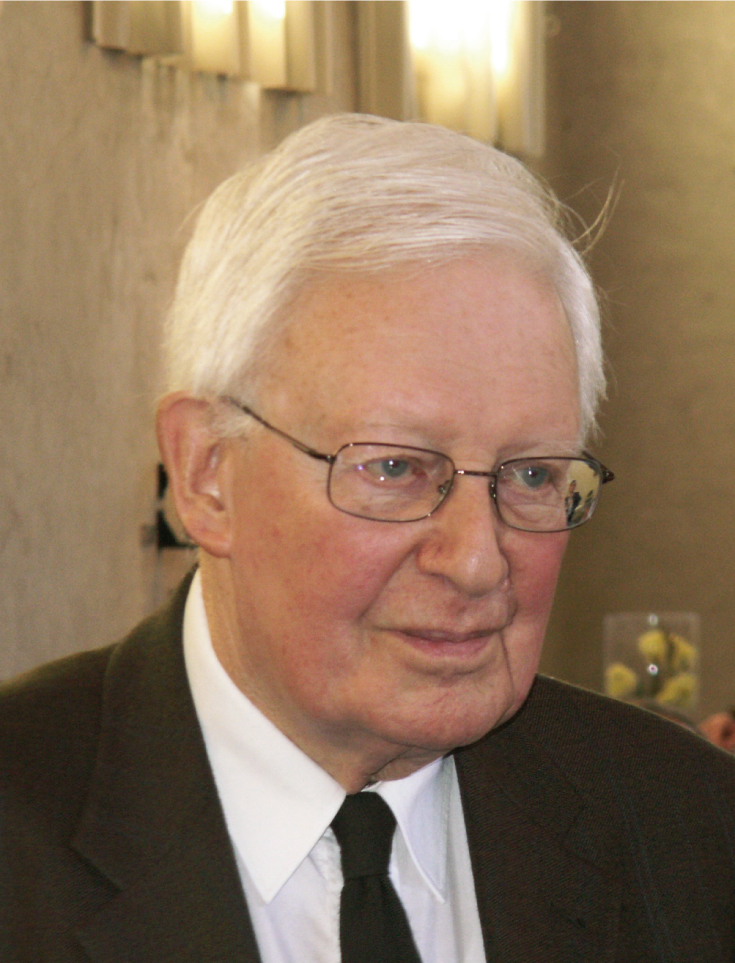
- Adolph Cornelis van Bruggen (2009)
- Born: 9 July 1929
- Died: 3 June 2016 (aged 86)
- Education: Leiden University
- Scientific career
- Fields: Malacology

Adolph Cornelis 'Dolf' van Bruggen (9 July 1929 – 3 June 2016) was a Dutch malacologist, entomologist, and botanist. His interest in the tropics and tropical Africa dominated his broad scientific interest for more than five decades. He was an expert especially in the land snail families Streptaxidae, Achatinidae and Maizaniidae. As of 2008, he had authored some 655 scientific publications.

== Early years ==
Adolph Cornelis van Bruggen was born on 9 July 1929, the eldest son of A.C. van Bruggen, Sr. and A.C.G. van Bruggen-van Eyk Bijleveld. He spent his youth in The Hague. Natural history and particularly animals always caught his attention. His father was a high-ranked civil servant at the Ministry of Education, Culture and Science. The Rijksmuseum van Natuurlijke Historie was administered by that ministry at the time, and when he graduated from the Gymnasium Haganum in The Hague in 1949, his father introduced him to Dr. Carel Octavius van Regteren Altena (1907–1976), curator of Mollusca at the museum, who stimulated his interest in malacology.

At Leiden University van Bruggen studied systematic botany, animal ecology and systematic zoology. In 1956 he graduated, after three years as an assistant to Prof. Dr. Hilbrand Boschma (1893–1976), the director of the Rijksmuseum van Natuurlijke Historie, who taught Systematic Zoology at Leiden University.

The start of van Bruggen's malacological career can be dated back to 1948, when he became a member of the Dutch Malacological Society (NMV). His first malacological publication, in Dutch, appeared in 1948 in the Dutch journal De Levende Natuur; a short note reporting a find of the marine bivalve Anomia ephippium, an uncommon species in the Netherlands. His very first publication had appeared earlier in the same year in the same journal; it reported a sighting of seals and a horse mackerel on a Dutch beach.

It was also in Leiden that van Bruggen met his wife, Wenda van Bruggen-Gorter. She became painfully aware of his malacological interests when one day on their honeymoon in Switzerland, they were returning home late in the evening and van Bruggen found a beautiful specimen of the slug Limax cinereoniger that he wanted for his collection. However, not having any glass vials with him (plastic bags were unknown in those days) he asked to use Wenda's evening bag to bring the animal home.

Originally intending to depart to the Dutch East Indies after his studies, this became impossible when the former Dutch colony achieved independence, as Indonesia, on 27 December 1949. Since van Bruggen had a firm interest in the tropics, the couple decided to move to Africa instead.

== In Africa (1957–1966) ==
They sailed to South Africa, stopping on their way at the remote Atlantic island of St Helena, in May 1957. In South Africa, van Bruggen had accepted a job at the Ministry of Agriculture in Pretoria. There he was charged with the study of insects and the problems they caused in warehouses. After three years he accepted the position of Marine Biologist and Curator at the newly erected Oceanarium in Port Elizabeth. Shortly afterwards, he accepted a position as curator at the Natal Museum in Pietermaritzburg. Both van Bruggens worked at the museum from 1962 to 1966; she as a librarian and his personal assistant in the field. They frequently went out for fieldwork, making collection trips as far north as Malawi and Zambia.

During his African years, in addition to his work on insects and snails, van Bruggen expanded into work on mammals and birds. Contacts with field staff of South African National Parks brought a new focus on nature conservation, and stimulated an interest in zoos. In 1963, at the 125th anniversary of Artis Zoo in Amsterdam, van Bruggen sent a number of rock hyraxes (Procavia capensis), as a gift from Dutch biologists working in South Africa.

At the beginning of 1966, van Bruggen accepted an invitation to return to the Netherlands to teach in the department of Systematic Zoology at Leiden University, invited van Bruggen to teach at that institution.

== In the Netherlands ==
At Leiden University, van Bruggen taught undergraduates in Systematic Zoology. In 1969 he received his Ph.D. with the thesis Studies on the land molluscs of Zululand with notes on the distribution of land molluscs in Southern Africa.

Although officially employed by the University, his actual place of work was a few minutes away at the Rijksmuseum van Natuurlijke Historie, where his supervisor was Prof. Dr Leo Brongersma, director of the museum.

Besides his work he devoted much time to various organizations. With the Dutch Malacological Society (Nederlandse Malacologische Vereniging, NMV), he served as Secretary (1953–1956), interim President (1970–1972) and Treasurer (1983–1986) on the Board. He was editor of the Correspondentieblad (1951–1953) and, after a short interruption, again from 1954 to 1956. Since 1968, he has been editor, then editor-in-chief, of Basteria, the scientific journal of NMV. He was elected Honorary Member of the Society in 1999.

He served as President of the 7th International Malacological Congress in Amsterdam in 1977, organized on behalf of Unitas Malacologica, the international organisation of malacologists. From 1989 to 1999, he was chairman of the Netherlands Commission for International Nature Conservation, also serving as editor of its communications. He also work with the Netherlands Zoological Society, the (former) Netherlands Foundation for Biological Research and the Dutch/Belgian Mammal Society.

He retired in 1994, with a lecture entitled Semper aliquid novi ex Africam adferre, which may be translated as "there is always something new from Africa", and which may be regarded as van Bruggen's personal motto. Afterwards he continued his studies as an associate of the Leiden museum, spending most of his days in the building at the Raamsteeg and later at the Darwinweg in Leiden, where he continues to study and publish on Mollusca and other topics.

Starting in the 1990s, the van Bruggen made several private trips to southern Africa. During their 2008 trip, van Bruggen accepted Dai Herbert's request to cooperate in revising some material collected in the Drakensberg Mountains, which allowed him to continue with his great love – land snails of South Africa.

He died 3 June 2016.

== Bibliography ==
Dolf van Bruggen's wide interest in systematic biology and related fields are reflected in his numerous publications, which cover topics as diverse as marine and non-marine Mollusca, mammals, amphibians, reptiles, birds, insects, as well as zoo biology, museum collections, nature conservation, bibliographical matters, and historical accounts, apart from numerous book reviews and obituaries, to name only the fields on which he wrote more than a single contribution. The complete listing of his publication include 655 records up till 2008.

The flow of publications over the years since 1948 continues to the present and has never been interrupted. Fluctuations in his production have been relatively small. On average, 11 papers appeared annually. There has never been a year with less than four papers and that happened only once. His most productive years (in number of papers) are 1960–1966, when he resided in South Africa; 1961 has been his most productive year with 23 papers.

His most important scientific contributions concern the fields of malacology, entomology and botany. His botanical publications are restricted to the year 1958, when he published two systematic papers on Sapotaceae from Borneo with the description of a new genus and two new species.

His entomological production lasted longer, from 1954 to 1963. In this period, he published 18 papers, mainly on Ephemeroptera from Southeast Asia and New Guinea, and on Diptera from southern Africa, thereby introducing 14 new species and two new genera.

The vast majority of his scientific papers dealt with the systematics and biogeography of the Mollusca. In the early period of his career he published on both marine and non-marine taxa, but the former more or less stopped after 1963, possibly related to his move from a marine institute at Port Elizabeth to the Natal Museum at Pietermaritzburg.

Most of van Bruggen's scientific work has been devoted to land snails, especially those from subsaharan Africa and the islands surrounding this continent. Although there are few families on which he has not published, there are three families that may be considered his particular area of expertise and fascination: the pulmonate families Streptaxidae and Achatinidae and the operculate (caenogastropod) family Maizaniidae.

The interest in the carnivorous family Streptaxidae was undoubtedly raised by van Bruggen's prolonged stay in South Africa, quite possibly inspired by Matthew William Kemble Connolly’s (1939) impressive monograph on the South African non-marine Mollusca, in which a picture of an extremely diverse and aesthetically appealing streptaxid radiation was painted. In all, he described three new genera and 60 new species and subspecies of Streptaxidae, all but four from Africa.

Achatinidae are a family of rather large land snails, and, in spite of their size, one that poses tremendous taxonomic problems, and van Bruggen is one of the few people who knows his way in the chaotic taxonomy of this group. He devoted various papers partly or wholly to the family and introduced six new species and subspecies. He was a friend of the recently deceased American Achatinidae specialist Albert Raymond Mead (1915–2009). They regularly exchanged opinions, but did not publish jointly.

A third group that apparently has his special interest are the terrestrial operculates, formerly known as ‘Prosobranchia’, a heterogeneous assemblage of gastropods with an operculum and separate males and females (in contrast to the hermaphrodite pulmonate land snails). Operculate gastropods appear to be particularly poorly represented in subsaharan Africa in comparison to other continents, especially tropical Asia. Since the early 1980s van Bruggen has taken it on him to revise the African representatives of this group, especially the families Maizaniidae and Cyclophoridae. This study resulted in the description of three new subgenera and ten new species (thereby doubling the number of African taxa known), and a series of papers with careful descriptions, keys and biogeographic analyses of the ‘prosobranch’ fauna in Africa and beyond.

== Taxa described ==
New taxa described by van Bruggen include (with type locality listed):

=== Gastropods ===
==== Streptaxidae ====
- Gulella adami van Bruggen, 1994 - Ivory Coast [Côte d'Ivoire].
- Gulella albinus van Bruggen & Van Goethem, 1999 - D.R. Congo.
- Gulella gwendolinae aldabrae van Bruggen, 1975 - Aldabra Is. [Seychelles].
- Ptychotrema altiplani van Bruggen, 1989 - Malawi.
- Gulella appletoni van Bruggen, 1975 - South Africa.
- Gulella aranearum van Bruggen, 1986 - Malawi.
- Gulella augur van Bruggen, 1988 - Tanzania.
- Austromarconia van Bruggen & de Winter, 2003 - type species Ennea hamiltoni Smith, 1897.
- Gulella barnardi van Bruggen, 1965 - South Africa.
- Gulella bernardi van Bruggen & van Goethem, 1997 - nom. nov. for Gulella sexdentata Taylor, 1880, non Gulella sexdentata (von Martens, 1869).
- Gulella darglensis benthodon van Bruggen, 1980 - South Africa.
- Gulella browni van Bruggen, 1969 - South Africa.
- Careoradula Gerlach & van Bruggen, 1999 - type species Streptaxis (Imperurbatia) perelegans Martens, 1898.
- Ptychotrema cazombense van Bruggen, 1989 - Angola.
- Gulella ceciliae van Bruggen, 1971 - Rhodesia [Zimbabwe].
- Ptychotrema collegarum van Bruggen, 1989 - Malawi.
- Gulella collicola van Bruggen, 1966 - Swaziland.
- Diaphera connectens van Bruggen, 1974 - Philippines.
- Gulella peakei continentalis van Bruggen, 1975 - South Africa.
- Ptychotrema cossyphae van Bruggen, 1989 - Uganda.
- Gulella cupula van Bruggen & van Goethem, 1999 - D.R. Congo.
- Gulella gouldi discriminanda van Bruggen, 1969 - South Africa.
- Gulella ectodentata van Bruggen & van Goethem, 1999 - D.R. Congo.
- Gulella garambae van Bruggen & van Goethem, 1999 - D.R. Congo.
- Ptychotrema glabellum van Bruggen, 1989 - Angola.
- Gulella guilielmi van Bruggen & van Goethem, 1998 - D.R. Congo.
- Gulella herberti van Bruggen, 2004 - Swaziland.
- Gulella hildae van Bruggen, 2001 - Malawi.
- Streptostele inconspicua van Bruggen, 1964 - Mozambique.
- Gulella incurvidens van Bruggen, 1972 - South Africa.
- Gulella inobstructa van Bruggen, 1965 - South Africa.
- Gulella insulincola van Bruggen, 1975 - Aldabra Is. [Seychelles].
- Ptychotrema interstriatum van Bruggen 1989 - Angola.
- Gulella johannae van Bruggen, 2006 - South Africa.
- Gulella crassidens jonesi van Bruggen, 1969 - South Africa.
- Haploptychius juttingae van Bruggen, 1972 - Indonesia.
- Ptychotrema kalemiense Adam, van Bruggen & van Goethem, 1994 - Zaire [D.R. Congo].
- Gulella lawrencei van Bruggen, 1964 - Mozambique.
- Gulella lievrouwi van Bruggen & van Goethem, 1999 - D.R. Congo.
- Gulella loveridgei van Bruggen, 1996 - Malawi, (publication dated 18 December 1995, published February 1996).
- Ptychotrema loveridgei van Bruggen, 1990 - Malawi.
- Gulella vicina luci van Bruggen, 1980 - Rhodesia [Zimbabwe].
- Gulella meredithae van Bruggen, 2000 - Malawi.
- Streptostele meridionalis van Bruggen, 1966 - South Africa. = Streptostele herma Connolly, 1912, vide van Bruggen, 1967
- Gulella microrutshuruensis van Bruggen, 1995 - Malawi.
- Ptychotrema multispiralis van Bruggen, 1989 - Malawi.
- Diaphera obliquapex van Bruggen, 1974 - Philippines.
- Gulella obstructa van Bruggen, 1965 - South Africa.
- Diaphera palawanica van Bruggen, 1974 - Philippines.
- Stereostele nevilli parvidentata Gerlach & van Bruggen, 1999 - Seychelles.
- Gulella peakei van Bruggen, 1975 - Aldabra Is. [Seychelles].
- Ptychotrema pervagatum van Bruggen, 1989 - Malawi.
- Edentulina dussumieri praslina Gerlach & van Bruggen, 1999 - Seychelles.
- Ptychotrema pseudosilvaticum Adam, van Bruggen & van Goethem, 1994 - Zaire [D.R. Congo].
- Edentulina dussumieri reservae Gerlach & van Bruggen, 1999 - Seychelles.
- Gulella ruwenzoriensis van Bruggen & van Goethem, 1999 - D.R. Congo.
- Streptostele sanctuarii van Bruggen, 1966 - South Africa.
- Gulella selene van Bruggen & van Goethem, 1999 - D.R. Congo.
- Edentulina dussumieri silhouettae Gerlach & van Bruggen, 1999 - Seychelles.
- Silhouettia Gerlach & van Bruggen, 1999 - type species Streptaxis (Imperturbatia) constans var. silhouettae Von Martens, 1898.

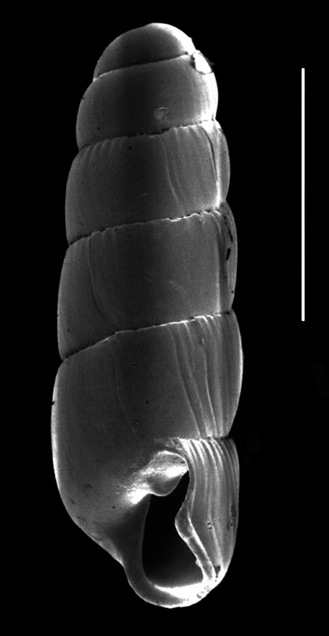
Gulella streptostelopsis

- Gulella streptostelopsis van Bruggen, 2007 - Malawi.
- Gulella sursum van Bruggen, 2001 - Malawi.
- Gulella systemanaturae van Bruggen, 2008 Malawi.
- Ptychotrema tanganyikae Adam, van Bruggen & van Goethem, 1995 - Zaire [D.R. Congo].
- Gulella elliptica tesserula van Bruggen, 1980 - South Africa.
- Gulella turriformis van Bruggen & van Goethem, 1999 - D.R. Congo.
- Gulella udzungwensis van Bruggen, 2003 - Tanzania.
- Ptrychotrema upembae Adam, van Bruggen & van Goethem, 1993 - D.R. Congo.
- Gulella verdcourti van Bruggen, 1966 - South Africa.
- Gulella virungae van Bruggen & van Goethem, 1999 - D.R. Congo.
- Gulella wendalinae van Bruggen, 1975 - South Africa.

==== Achatinidae ====
- Archachatina aenigmatica van Bruggen, 1977 - Rhodesia [Zimbabwe].
- Achatina coroca van Bruggen, 1978 - Angola.
- Archachatina ustulata limitanea van Bruggen, 1984 - South Africa.
- Archachatina montistempli van Bruggen, 1965 - South Africa.
- Archachatina omissa van Bruggen, 1965 South Africa.
- Archachatina sanctaeluciae van Bruggen, 1989 - South Africa.

==== Maizaniidae ====
- Neomaizania coryli van Bruggen, 1985 - Malawi.
- Maizaniella erroris van Bruggen, 1982 - Liberia.
- Maizaniella hiemalis van Bruggen, 1990 - Guinée [Guinea].
- Maizaniella iterum van Bruggen, 1991 - Gabon.
- Maizaniella machadoi van Bruggen, 1982 - Angola.
- Macromaizaniella van Bruggen, 1982 - type species Cyclophorus preussi Von Martens, 1892.
- Neomaizania van Bruggen, 1985 - type species Neomaizania coryli van Bruggen, 1985.
- Maizaniella poensis van Bruggen, 1982 - Fernando Poo [Bioko, Equatorial Guinea].
- Pteromaizaniella van Bruggen, 1982 - type species Maizaniella (Pteromaizaniella) poensis van Bruggen, 1982.
- Maizania scalarioidea van Bruggen, 1983 - Malawi.
- Spirulozania van Bruggen, 1982 - type species Cyclophorus lilliputianus Morelet, 1873.

==== Other land gastropods ====
- Truncatellina adami van Bruggen, 1994 - Fernando Poo [Bioko, Equatorial Guinea], (Stylommatophora, Vertiginidae).
- Punctum adami van Bruggen & Van Goethem, 2001, D.R. Congo, (Stylommatophora, Punctidae).
- Afroconulus Van Mol & van Bruggen, 1971 - type species Sitala diaphana Connolly, 1922, (Stylommatophora, Euconulidae).
- Afroguppya de Winter & van Bruggen, 1992 - type species Thapsia rumrutiensis Preston, 1911, (Stylommatophora, Euconulidae).
- Curvella amicitiae van Bruggen, 1968 - South Africa, (Stylommatophora, Subulinidae).
- Carinazingis van Bruggen & de Winter, 1990 - type species Carinazingis regalis van Bruggen & de Winter, 1990, (Stylommatophora, Urocyclidae).
- Chondrocyclus chirindae van Bruggen, 1986 - Zimbabwe, (Caenogastropoda, Cyclophoridae).
- Zingis chirindensis van Bruggen & Verdcourt, 1968 - Rhodesia [Zimbabwe], (Stylommatophora, Urocyclidae).
- Rachis cunctatoris van Bruggen, 1975 - Malawi, (Stylommatophora, Cerastidae).
- Dendrotrichia van Bruggen & Verdcourt, 1965, type species Trachycystis (Dendrotrichia) sylvicola van Bruggen & Verdcourt, 1965 (Stylommatophora, Charopidae).
- Sculptaria fumarium van Bruggen & Rolán, 2003 - Namibia, (Stylommatophora, Sculptariidae).
- Fauxulus grayi van Bruggen & Meredith, 1983 - Malawi, (Stylommatophora, Orculidae).
- Pseudoglessula haackei van Bruggen, 1966 - South Africa, (Stylommatophora, Subulinidae).
- Pseudoglessula hamiltoni van Bruggen, 1966 - South Africa, (Stylommatophora, Subulinidae).
- Trachycystis langi van Bruggen, 1994 - South Africa, (Stylommatophora, Charopidae).
- Pseudoglessula libera Solem & van Bruggen, 1976 - Guinea [Guinée], (Stylommatophora, Subulinidae).
- Chondrocyclus meredithae van Bruggen, 1983 - Malawi, (Caenogastropoda, Cyclophoridae).
- Trachycystis montissalinarum van Bruggen, 2002 - South Africa, (Stylommatophora, Charopidae).
- Phortion occidentalis van Bruggen, 1982 - South Africa, (Stylommatophora, Charopidae).
- Asperitas trochus parvinsularis van Bruggen, 1976 - Indonesia, (Stylommatophora, Ariophantidae).
- Cerastua procrastinationis van Bruggen, 1993 - Malawi, (Stylommatophora, Cerastidae).
- Prestonellidae van Bruggen, 1978 is not available name. Type genus is Prestonella Connolly, 1929. Prestonellidae has been considered as a synonym for Aillyidae according to the taxonomy of Bouchet & Rocroi (2005).
- Prestonellinae van Bruggen, Herbert & Breure, 2016
- Carinazingis regalis van Bruggen & de Winter, 1990 - Malawi, (Stylommatophora, Urocyclidae).
- Afroguppya solemi de Winter & van Bruggen, 1992 - Togo, (Stylommatophora, Euconulidae).
- Trachycystis sylvicola van Bruggen & Verdcourt, 1965 - S. Rhodesia [Zimbabwe], (Stylommatophora, Charopidae).
- Curvella transvaalensis van Bruggen, 1978 - South Africa, (Stylommatophora, Subulinidae).
- Cyathopoma tres van Bruggen, 2008 - Malawi, (Caenogastropoda, Cyclophoridae).

==== Marine gastropods ====
- Pyrene sorongensis van Bruggen, 1956 - West New Guinea [Indonesia, Papua] (Caenogastropoda, Columbellidae).

=== Bivalves ===
- Pecten sulcicostatus var. casa van Bruggen, 1961 - South Africa, (Bivalvia, Pectinidae).

=== Insects ===
- Afromelittodes Oldroyd & van Bruggen, 1963, type species Afromelittodes solis Oldroyd & van Bruggen, 1963 (Diptera, Asilidae).
- Pyrgotina antidorcas van Bruggen, 1961 - South Africa - Northern Cape. (Diptera, Pyrgotidae).
- Atriangulum van Bruggen, 1960 - type species: Atriangulum brevicostatum van Bruggen, 1960 (Diptera, Cryptochaetidae).
- Cryptochaetum brevicostatum van Bruggen, 1960 - South Africa - Gauteng, (Diptera, Cryptochaetidae).
- Cryptochaetum capense van Bruggen, 1960 - South Africa - Eastern Cape Province, (Diptera, Cryptochaetidae).
- Caenis demoulini van Bruggen, 1954 - Thailand, (Ephemeroptera, Caenidae).
- Cryptochaetum mixtum van Bruggen, 1960 - South Africa - Free State, (Diptera, Cryptochaetidae).
- Tephritopyrgota munroi van Bruggen, 1961 - South Africa - Gauteng, (Diptera, Pyrgotidae).
- Cloeon navasi van Bruggen, 1957 - Zhejiang, China, (Ephemeroptera, Baetidae).
- Tasmanocaenis novaeguineae van Bruggen, 1957 - Indonesia, Irian Jaya (West New Guinea), (Ephemeroptera, Caenidae).
- Prohypotyphla pallidipennis van Bruggen, 1961 - South Africa - Limpopo Province, (Diptera, Pyrgotidae).
- Cloeon papuanum van Bruggen, 1957 - Indonesia, Irian Jaya (West New Guinea), (Ephemeroptera, Baetidae).
- Chrysopilus rhodesiensis van Bruggen, 1960 - Zimbabwe, (Diptera, Rhagionidae).
- Afromelittodes solis Oldroyd & van Bruggen, 1963 - South Africa - NorthWest Province, (Diptera, Asilidae).
- Cryptochaetum utilis van Bruggen, 1960 - South Africa - KwaZulu-Natal, (Cryptochaetidae).
- Neosciara wendalinae van Bruggen, 1954 - the Netherlands, (Diptera, Lycoriidae).

=== Plants ===
- Payena gigas van Bruggen, 1958 - Malaysia (Borneo: Sabah), (Sapotaceae).
- Payena lamii van Bruggen, 1958 - Malaysia (Borneo: Sarawak), (Sapotaceae).
- Pupureopayena van Bruggen, 1958 - the type species: Pupureopayena dasyphylla (Miquel) Pierre, 1885 (Sapotaceae).

== Taxa named in honour ==
The following taxa have been named in honour (eponyms) of Dolf van Bruggen:

Arachnida

- Hamataliwa vanbruggeni Deeleman-Reinhold, 2009 Type locality: Malaysian Borneo, W. Sabah, Mt.Kinabalu area, Sorinsim (Arachnida, Oxyopidae).

Diplopoda

- Spinotarsus bruggenorum Kraus, 1966 Type locality: Zululand, Ndumu Game Reserve, Engabateni forest (Diplopoda).

Insecta

- Diopsis vanbruggeni H. R. Feijen & C. Feijen, 2009 Type locality: Malawi, Ntchisi rainforest, small tributary stream of Mahatope River (Diptera, Diopsidae).
- Notiophygus vanbruggeni John, 1964 Type locality: Zululand (Coleoptera, Discolomidae) [taxon mentioned in the Zoological Record, but not found in publication].
- Phaenocarpa vanbruggeni van Achterberg, 2009 Type locality: Madagascar, Tanatare, Périnet (Hymenoptera, Braconidae).
- Selinda bruggeni Theron, 1986 Type locality: Zimbabwe, Chirinda Forest, Mount Selinda (Homoptera, Cicadellidae).
- Termitotrox vanbruggeni Krikken, 2008 Type locality: Kenya, Karen (Coleoptera, Scarabaeidae).

Gastropoda

- Apera bruggeni Forcart, 1967 Type locality: South Africa, Limpopo Prov. (Chlamydephoridae).
- Bruggenina Mead, 2004 Type species by original designation Archachatina sandgroundi Bequaert, 1950 (Achatinidae).
- Bruggennea Dance, 1972 Type species by original designation: Sinoennea laidlawi Dance, 1970 (Streptaxidae).
- Centrafricarion bruggeni Van Mol, 1970 Type locality: Malawi, Nyika Plateau, Zozu Chipolo Forest (Urocyclidae).
- Chrysallida vanbruggeni van Aartsen & Corgan, 1996 New name for Odostomia ornata Turton, 1932 not H. & A. Adams, 1853 (Pyramidellidae).
- Cingula bruggeni Verduin, 1984 Type locality: Spain, Strait of Gibraltar, Tarifa (Rissoidae).
- Cyclostremiscus vanbruggeni De Jong & Coomans, 1988 Type locality: Caribbean Sea (Tornidae).

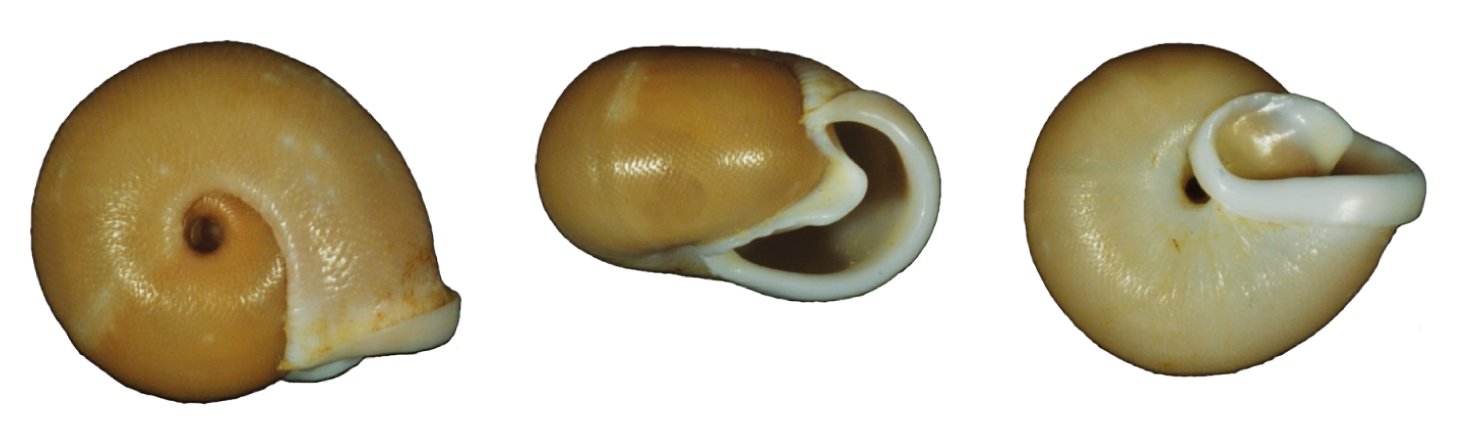
three views of the shell of Chloritis vanbruggeni

- Chloritis vanbruggeni Maassen, 2009 Type locality: Indonesia, Central Sulawesi, Pulau [Island] Peleng, Gunung [Mount] Tatarandang (Camaenidae).
- Gulella bruggeni Cole & Herbert, 2009 Type locality: South Africa, E. Cape, Transkei, Hluleka Nature Reserve (Streptaxidae).
- Gulella mkuu Rowson, Seddon & Tattersfield, 2009 Type locality: Kenya, Rift Valley Province, Samburu District, Ndoto Mountains (Streptaxidae). Dedication in the reference include: "From Swahili noun or adjective mkuu, meaning great, principal, elder, chief, etc. As a noun in apposition, with reference to the size of the shell, but also to Dr A.C. van Bruggen, a distinguished and esteemed contributor to African malacology."
- Inchoatia megdova bruggeni Gittenberger & Uit de Weerd, 2009 Type locality: Greece, Thessalia, Trikala, 7.5 km WNW of Pyli (= Pili), 8.5 km S of Elati along road to Agh. Prokopios (Clausiliidae).
- Mitrella bruggeni van Aartsen, Menkhorst & Gittenberger, 1984 New name for Mitrella broderipi auct. not Sowerby, 1844 (Columbellidae).
- Parennea vanbruggeni de Winter, 2008 Type locality: Cameroon, Sud Province, Meka’a-II, W of Nyangong (Streptaxidae).
- Plekocheilus (Eurytus) bruggeni Breure, 1978 Type locality: Peru, Dept. Pasco, Huancabamba (Orthalicidae).

Bivalvia

- Sunetta bruggeni Fischer-Piette, 1974 New name for Sunetta ovalis Sowerby, 1892 not Martin, 1880 (Veneridae).
