= Priodiscus =

Scientific classification
- Domain: Eukaryota
- Kingdom: Animalia
- Phylum: Mollusca
- Class: Gastropoda
- Order: Stylommatophora
- Family: Streptaxidae
- Genus: Priodiscus; Martens, 1898

Diversity
- 3 species

Genus of gastropods

Priodiscus is a genus of air-breathing land snails, terrestrial pulmonate gastropod mollusks in the family Streptaxidae.

== Distribution ==
The genus Priodiscus is endemic to the Seychelles.

== Species ==
There are three species within the genus Priodiscus and they include:

- Priodiscus costatus
- Priodiscus serratus (Adams, 1868)
- Priodiscus spinatus
