= Glabrennea gardineri =

Conservation status
- Endangered (IUCN 3.1)

Scientific classification
- Kingdom: Animalia
- Phylum: Mollusca
- Class: Gastropoda
- Order: Stylommatophora
- Family: Streptaxidae
- Genus: Glabrennea
- Species: G. gardineri

Binomial name
- Glabrennea gardineri (Sykes, 1909)

Synonyms
- Gulella gardineri (Sykes, 1909)

Species of gastropod

Glabrennea gardineri is a species of air-breathing land snail, a terrestrial pulmonate gastropod mollusk in the family Streptaxidae.

== Distribution ==
Glabrennea gardineri is endemic to the Mahé Island and Silhouette Island in the Seychelles.
