= Chloritis vanbruggeni =

Scientific classification
- Domain: Eukaryota
- Kingdom: Animalia
- Phylum: Mollusca
- Class: Gastropoda
- Order: Stylommatophora
- Family: Camaenidae
- Genus: Chloritis
- Species: C. vanbruggeni

Binomial name
- Chloritis vanbruggeni Maassen, 2009

Species of gastropod

Chloritis vanbruggeni is a species of air-breathing land snail, a terrestrial pulmonate gastropod mollusk in the family Camaenidae.

== Etymology ==
The specific name vanbruggeni is named in honor of Dr. Adolph Cornelis van Bruggen, well-known malacologist, on the occasion of his 80th birthday and in recognition of his work on the malacofauna of Indonesia.

== Distribution ==
The type locality is Indonesia, Central Sulawesi, Pulau [Island] Peleng, Gunung [Mount] Tatarandang, near village at foot of the mountain in low vegetation. The holotype is stored in the Nationaal Natuurhistorisch Museum Naturalis.

== Shell description ==
Shell is solid, of a light ochre color, biconcave, regularly striated with very fine axial riblets, with numerous periostracal hairs (visible in this well cleaned sample as hair pits), covering the whole surface. The spire is deeply sunken, with 3¾-4½ whorls. Whorls are rounded, first whorls very narrow, the last one very large, and embracing the preceding one, distinctly descending in front. The umbilicus is deep, and very small (about 1/20 of the width of the shell) and partly hidden by the expanded columellar side of the peristome. The aperture is crescent, a little oblique. The peristome is very thick and expanded all around and somewhat reflexed. The two ends are connected by an extremely thick callus, forming a very strong and quite sharp arcuate tooth on the body of the penultimate whorl.

The width of the shell is 18.2-24.6 mm. The height of the shell is 10.7-14.0 mm. The width of the holotype is 21.7 mm. The height of the holotype is 13.0 mm.

So far, this most remarkable species can not be confused with any other Chloritis species because of its peculiar appearance; so far it is the only species with such a strong and sharp arcuate tooth.

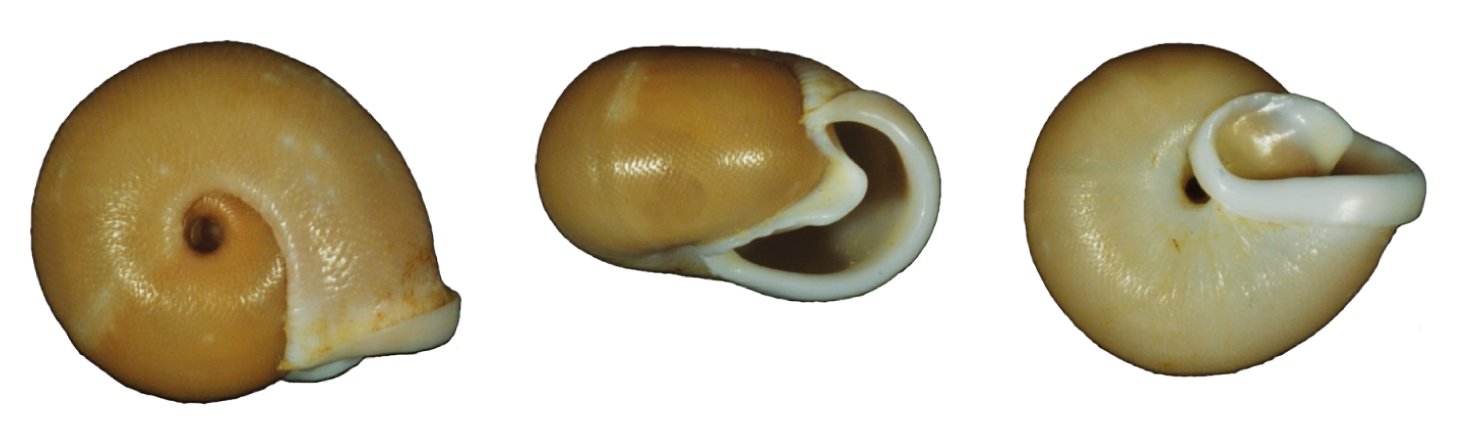
Apical, apertural and umbilical view of the shell of the holotype of Chloritis vanbruggeni. The width of the shell is 21.7 mm.
