= Glabrennea silhouettensis =

Conservation status
- Critically Endangered (IUCN 3.1)

Scientific classification
- Kingdom: Animalia
- Phylum: Mollusca
- Class: Gastropoda
- Order: Stylommatophora
- Family: Streptaxidae
- Genus: Glabrennea
- Species: G. silhouettensis

Binomial name
- Glabrennea silhouettensis (Verdcourt, 1994)

Synonyms
- Gulella silhouettensis Verdcourt, 1994

Species of gastropod

Glabrennea silhouettensis is a species of air-breathing land snail, a terrestrial pulmonate gastropod mollusk in the family Streptaxidae.

== Distribution ==
Glabrennea silhouettensis is endemic to Mont Dauban on Silhouette Island in the Seychelles.
