= Imperturbatia =

Scientific classification
- Kingdom: Animalia
- Phylum: Mollusca
- Class: Gastropoda
- Order: Stylommatophora
- Family: Streptaxidae
- Genus: Imperturbatia; Martens, 1898

Genus of gastropods

Imperturbatia is a genus of air-breathing land snails, terrestrial pulmonate gastropod mollusks in the family Streptaxidae.

== Distribution ==
Distribution of the genus Imperturbatia include:

- the Seychelles

== Species ==
Species within the genus Imperturbatia include:

- Imperturbatia violescens (Martens, 1898)
