= Augustula =

Conservation status
- Vulnerable (IUCN 3.1)

Scientific classification
- Kingdom: Animalia
- Phylum: Mollusca
- Class: Gastropoda
- Order: Stylommatophora
- Family: Streptaxidae
- Subfamily: Orthogibbinae
- Genus: Augustula; Thiele, 1931
- Species: A. braueri

Binomial name
- Augustula braueri (Martens, 1898)

Synonyms
- Streptaxis (Imperturbatia) braueri Martens, 1898; Imperturbatio braueri; Imperturbatia braueri

Species of gastropod

Augustula braueri is a species of air-breathing land snail, terrestrial pulmonate gastropod mollusc in the family Streptaxidae.

Augustula braueri is the only species within the genus Augustula.

== Distribution ==
Augustula braueri is endemic to the Seychelles.
