= Rijksmuseum van Geologie en Mineralogie =

Museum in the Netherlands

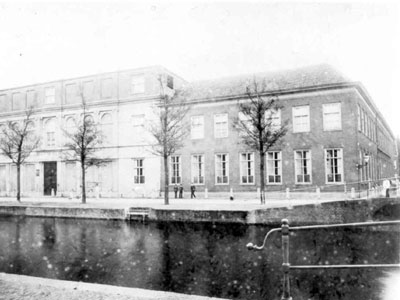
First building, Rapenburg Leiden (1878-1893)

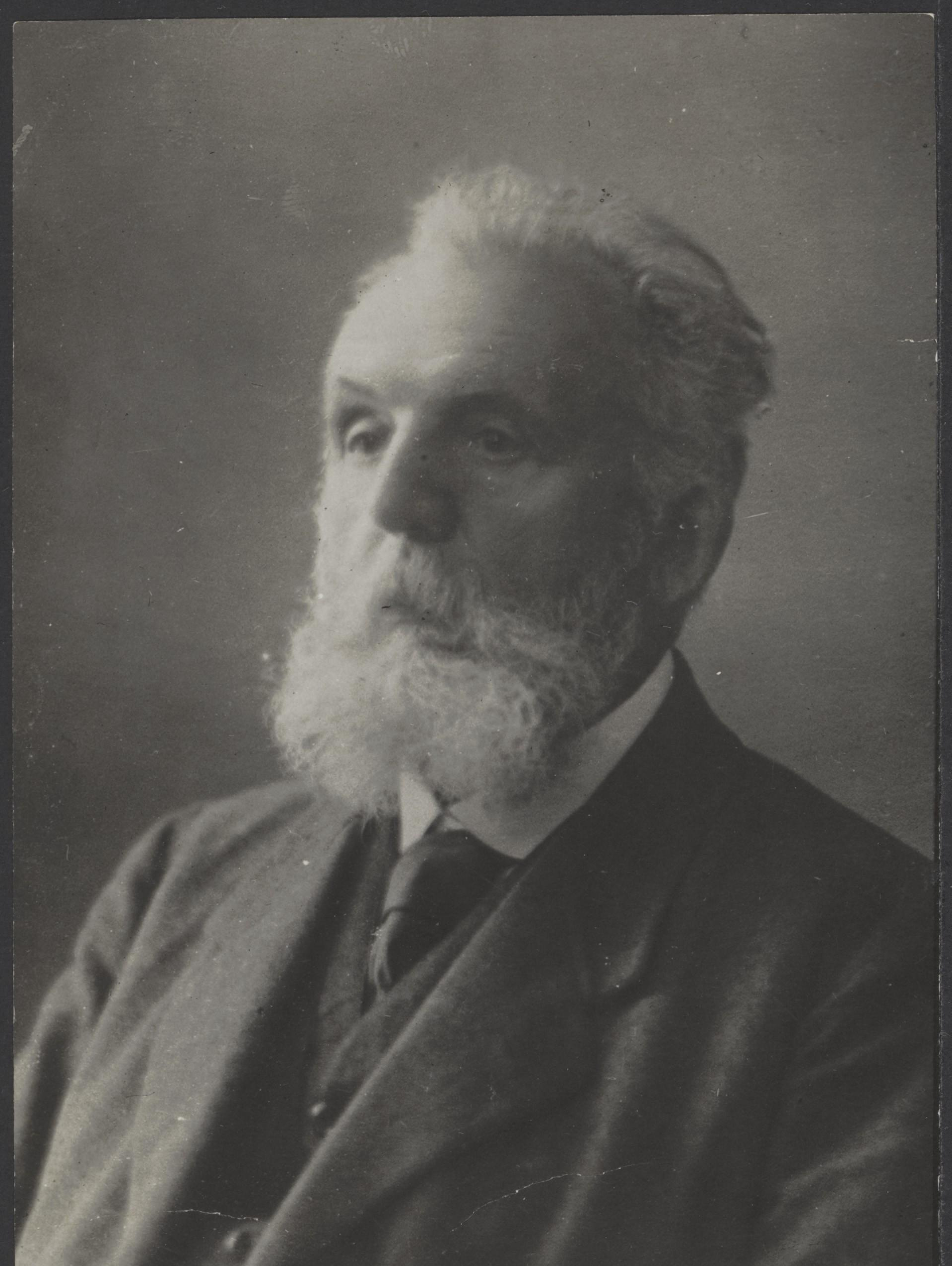
Martin

The Rijksmuseum van Geologie en Mineralogie was a museum of geological and mineralogical collections. Up to 1878, geological and mineralogical collections formed part of Rijksmuseum van Natuurlijke Historie, the National Museum of Natural History. This museum, founded in 1820 and established at Leiden, was closely linked with the university there. One of the staff members used to be in charge of the geological collections. In 1893 the collection was moved into a new building at the Van der Werffpark/Garenmarkt as the Rijksmuseum van Geologie en Mineralogie, representing a great step forward. The RGM thus became completely independent and was no longer regarded as part of the Natural History Museum.

== History ==
A list of the early curators of the museum and their roles in the museum's history are included here.

=== K. Martin (1878-1922) ===
Proposed by the then director of the Natural History Museum, H. Schlegel, K. Martin, a young German geologist, was appointed as ordinary professor of geology at the Leiden University in 1877. In 1878, Martin was also put in charge of the geological and mineralogical collections, which continued to be housed in the Natural History Museum. Under Martin's directorate the collections steadily grew, while increasing in scope and scientific importance. From 1881 onward, most of the fossils collected by the mining engineers of the Mining Survey of the Netherlands East Indies were sent to Leiden for examination by Martin.

Martin's interests were also aroused by the West Indies. During a field trip in 1884-1885 he managed to make extensive collections, comprising well over 800 specimens, in Aruba, Curaçao and Bonaire as well as in Surinam and Venezuela. The second journey Martin was able to undertake led to the Moluccas in the East Indies. Here again Martin succeeded in collecting much material. According to the entry in the Museum's list of acquisitions for 1892, he brought home a collection of 1063 specimens.

A number of collections have come to the Museum by means of exchange. The material offered in exchange consisted in most cases of duplicates from the Java Tertiary. In this way the RGM was enriched with series of fossils from Australia, Great Britain, Bosnia, Maryland, Paris Basin, and other regions. Apart from these means of extending the RGM collections, Martin managed to buy several important ones: one from the Philippines, collected by C. Semper and another one from Java and Madura.

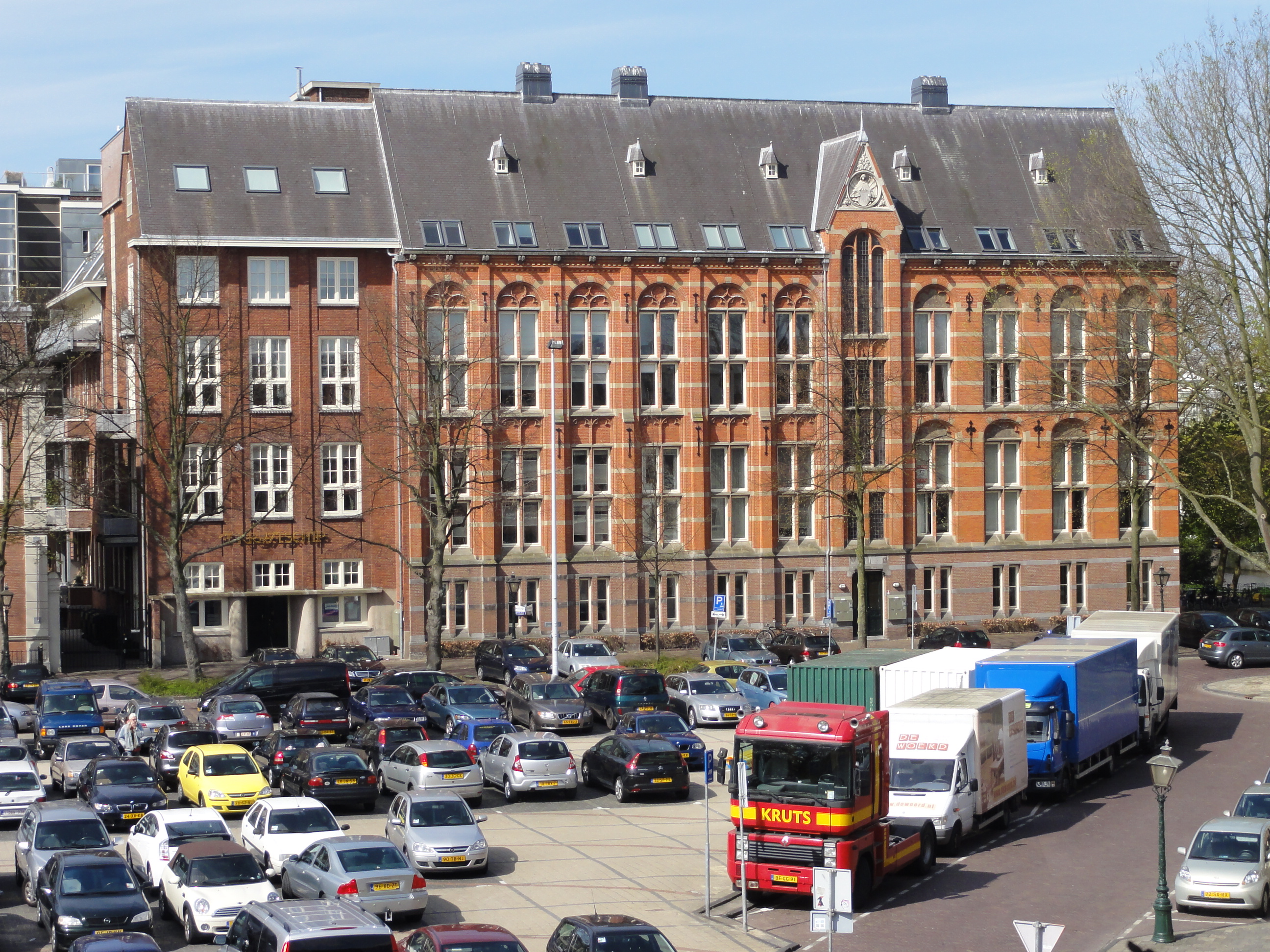
2nd Building, Garenmarkt Leiden (1893-1966)

Moving into a new building at the Van der Werffpark/Garenmarkt in 1893 meant a great step forward. The RGM thus became completely independent and was no longer regarded as part of the Natural History Museum.

=== B.G. Escher (1922-1955) ===
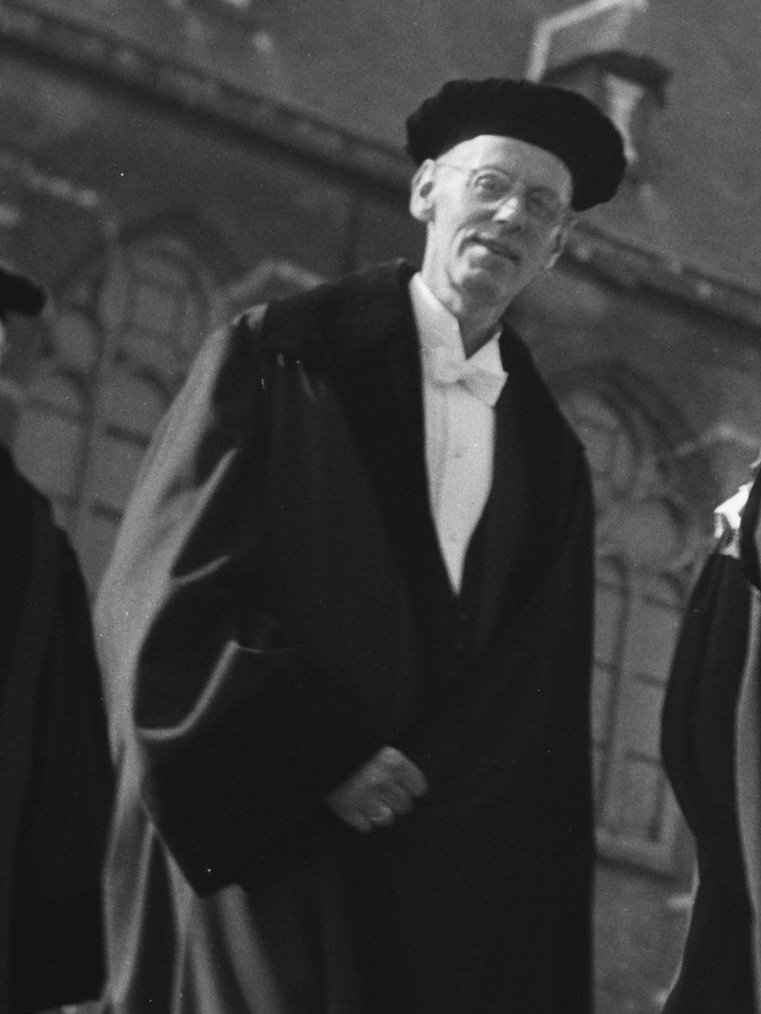
Escher (1947)

In 1922 Martin was succeeded by B.G. Escher. Under his responsibility the Museum collections continued growing. Under Escher's guidance field work was started in the porphyry district near Lugano; soon afterwards in the Bergamasc Alps in northern Italy, and later also more in the south, in the Apennines and Turin Hills. Most samples and specimens collected during excursions with students were stored in the Museum. All these activities accumulated European material; Escher led excursions to Switzerland and Italy; staff members also to 'classical' regions in Germany, France and England.

After the Second World War the areas where Leiden students did their field work became more varied, and this meant also more variety in the collections brought to the Museum. In the first place may be mentioned the Netherlands itself, which until the war had not attracted many students. Most of them still went farther afield: Sweden (Dalsland), France (Pyrenees, Belledonne), Switzerland (southern Alps), Spain (Cantabrian Mountains and Galicia), Morocco and even Surinam. Investigations in these areas led to numerous publications, and in many cases the samples described were stored in the RGM.

In 1946 A. Brouwer was promoted to a curatorship in charge of the palaeontological department. He augmented the collections from the Netherlands concerning the Pleistocene mammalian remains. Brouwer followed an active policy in gaining material by buying representative collections from amateur geologists when opportunity and money permitted, and by going out on collecting trips himself.

Meanwhile, mammalian fossils kept coming in. They include two important collections: that of A. B. van Deinse containing cetacean remains, i.a. from the eastern part of the Netherlands, at first on loan, later permanently deposited in the RGM; and a large amount of fossils from the type locality of the Tiglian, the 'Steyl' collection, assigned to the RGM by the Minister of Education, Arts and Science.

=== I.M. Van der Vlerk (1955-1961) ===
Van der Vlerk succeeded Escher, who retired in 1955. Owing to his efforts the collection of the late J. H. F. Umbgrove was purchased. It contained — apart from much other valuable material — a large number of fossils from the Upper Cretaceous of southern Limburg and as such was a very desirable and important addition. Two more cases are worth mentioning: a donation of some 1500 erratics by the Geological Museum of Wageningen University, and a gift from the 'Nederlandse Aardolie Maatschappij' consisting of c. 250 cores from borings in various parts of the Netherlands. Van der Vlerk resigned early 1961.

=== C. Beets (1963-1977) ===
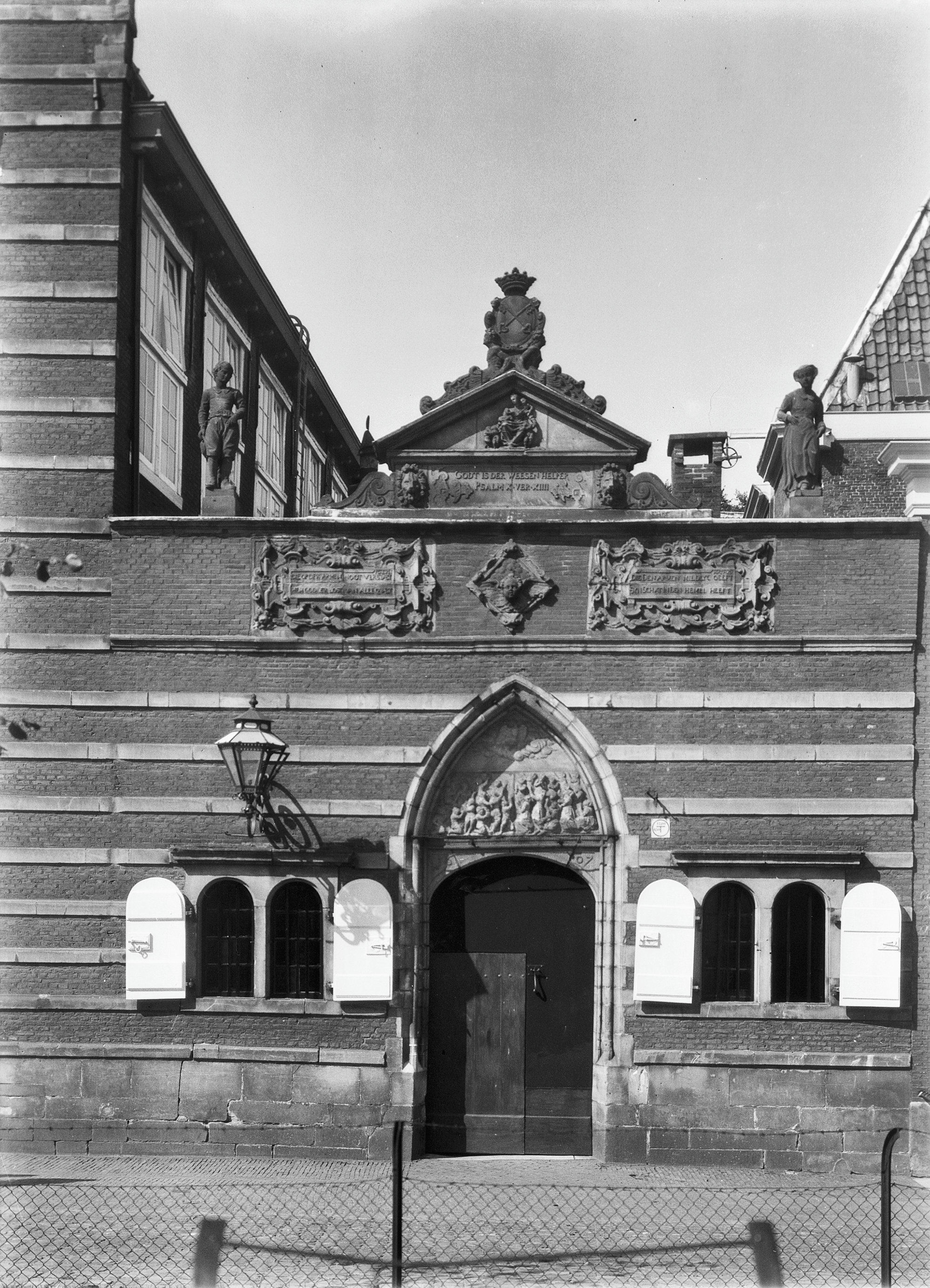
3rd Building: Hooglandse Kerkgracht

After his retirement P. C. Zwaan became acting director followed by C. Beets who was appointed director of the RGM in 1963. Beets set himself to the task of making the RGM not only in name but also de facto the Dutch national geological museum and centre of research. He could put his plans into practice after the removal to the Hooglandse Kerkgracht in 1966.

Intensive collecting campaigns were taken up, for instance in the eastern part of the Netherlands from Tertiary deposits of the Winterswijk-Almelo region; in the southern part from the continental Pleistocene of Tegelen; in Italy from Neogene fissure fillings in Gargano. Apart from these campaigns, Museum staff members went all over Europe on collecting trips or further afield: Canada, U.S.A., Jamaica, El Salvador, Algeria, Rhodesia, Ceylon (Sri Lanka) and Australia.

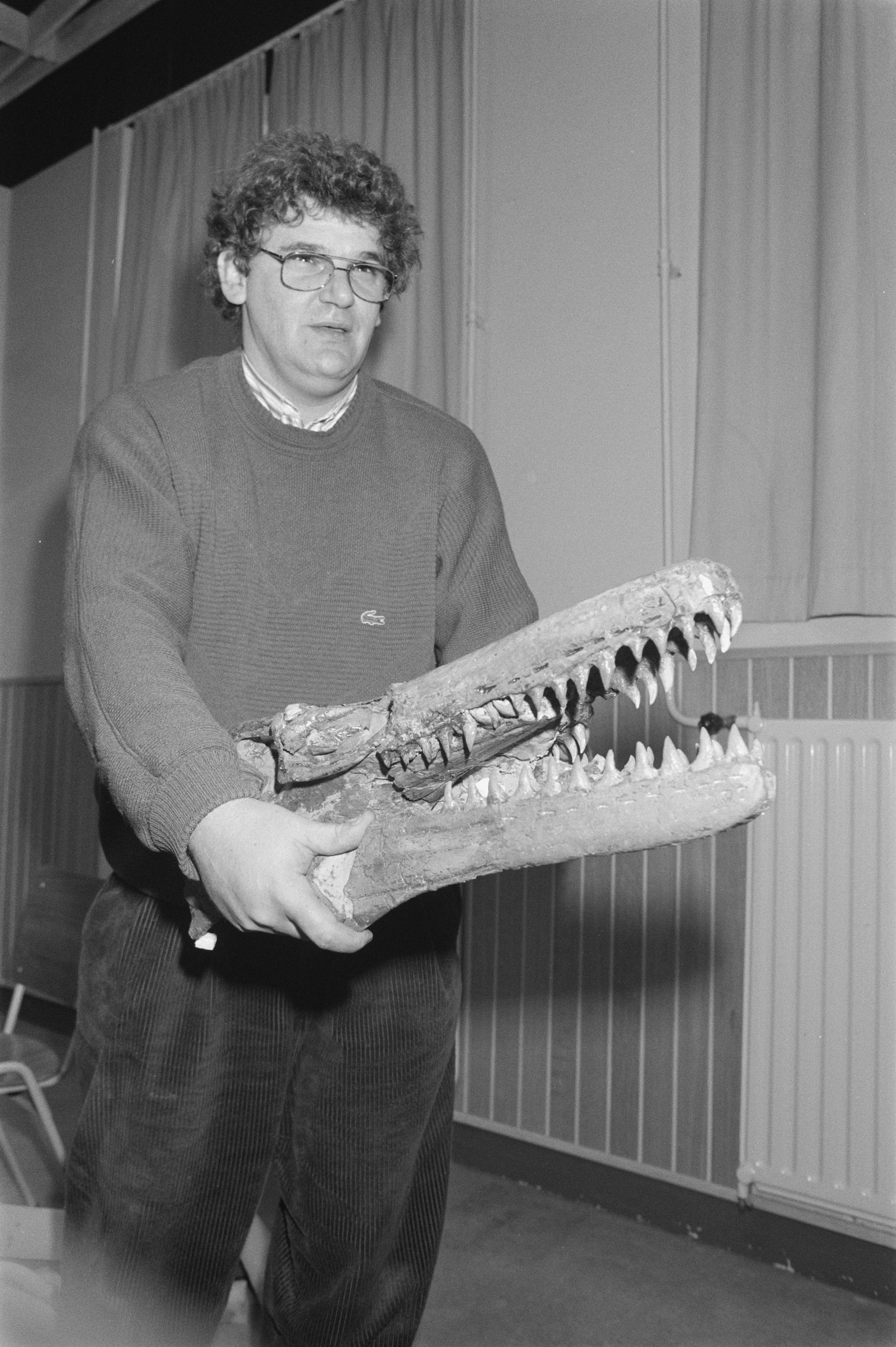
Acquisition of mosasaurus fossile (1988)

In this period the RGM received much valuable material from other sources as well. To name a few important additions: Fossils and samples from numerous borings in the eastern part of the Netherlands, donated by the 'Nederlandse Aardolie Maatschappij'. Hundreds of ore and rock samples from Billiton and many other parts of the world, and about 1000 drilling samples from the Mbeya carbonatite of Tanzania, donated by the 'Billiton Maatschappij'. Some 6300 samples and about 5000 thin sections of sedimentary and crystalline rocks of the Oman Mountains, donated by the 'Shell Internationale Petroleum Maatschappij', The Hague. The collection of the late R. Lagaaij, containing thousands of bryozoan samples from all parts of the world, together with his extensive library. A comprehensive collection of fossils and rock specimens (a.o. that of Molengraaff's Borneo expedition 1893/94) from the Geological Institute of Groningen University. A large collection of fossils, notably foraminifera and rudists, and rock specimens from the Cretaceous and Tertiary of Jamaica, from the Geological Institute of the University of Amsterdam. Many thesis collections, presented by the Geological Institute of Leiden University. The collection of H.M.E. Schürmann (in part): Precambrian rocks of the Eastern Desert, Egypt.

Beets resigned in 1977 and was followed by P.C. Zwaan as acting director.

The Rijksmuseum van Geologie en Mineralogie merged with the Rijksmuseum van Natuurlijke Historie in 1984 into what eventually became Naturalis.
