= Silhouettia =

Conservation status
- Vulnerable (IUCN 3.1)

Scientific classification
- Kingdom: Animalia
- Phylum: Mollusca
- Class: Gastropoda
- Order: Stylommatophora
- Family: Streptaxidae
- Subfamily: Orthogibbinae
- Genus: Silhouettia; Gerlach & van Bruggen, 1999
- Species: S. silhouettae

Binomial name
- Silhouettia silhouettae (Martens, 1898)

Synonyms
- Streptaxis (Imperturbatia) constans var. Silhouettae Martens, 1898; Imperturbatia levieuxi

Genus of gastropods

Silhouettia silhouettae is a species of air-breathing land snail, terrestrial pulmonate gastropod mollusk in the family Streptaxidae.

Silhouettia silhouettae is the only species within the genus Silhouettia.

== Distribution ==
Silhouettia silhouettae is endemic to Silhouette Island, the Seychelles.
