= Zoologische Verhandelingen =

- Discipline: Zoology
- Language: English

Publication details
- Publisher: Rijksmuseum van Natuurlijke Historie (The Netherlands)

Standard abbreviations
- ISO 4: Zool. Verh.

Indexing
- ISSN: 0024-1652

Links
- Journal homepage

Zoologische Verhandelingen was a Dutch scientific journal covering research in zoology. It was published between 1948 and 2002 by the Rijksmuseum van Natuurlijke Historie in Leiden. All issues are available online.
