= Rijksmuseum van Natuurlijke Historie =

Former Dutch natural history museum

Coordinates: 52°09′30″N 4°29′09″E

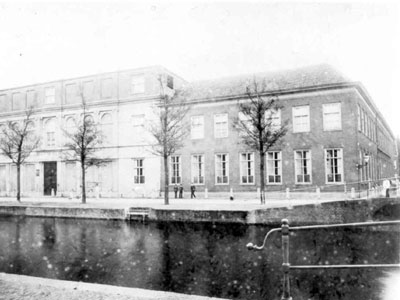
The Rijksmuseum van Natuurlijke Historie (left) on the Rapenburg in 1880. The building on the right is the Physisch Kabinet which was used for demonstrations of physics and public lectures.

The Rijksmuseum van Natuurlijke Historie (National Museum of Natural History) was a museum on the Rapenburg in Leiden, the Netherlands. It was founded in 1820 by Royal Decree from a merger of several existing collections including Temminck's own collection. This happened on the initiative of Coenraad Jacob Temminck, who saw the museum primarily as a research institute for the University of Leiden. The total collection was already quite large at the time, and continued to grow from foreign expeditions and by obtaining private collections from inheritances. The location is currently used by the Rijksmuseum van Oudheden.

== History ==
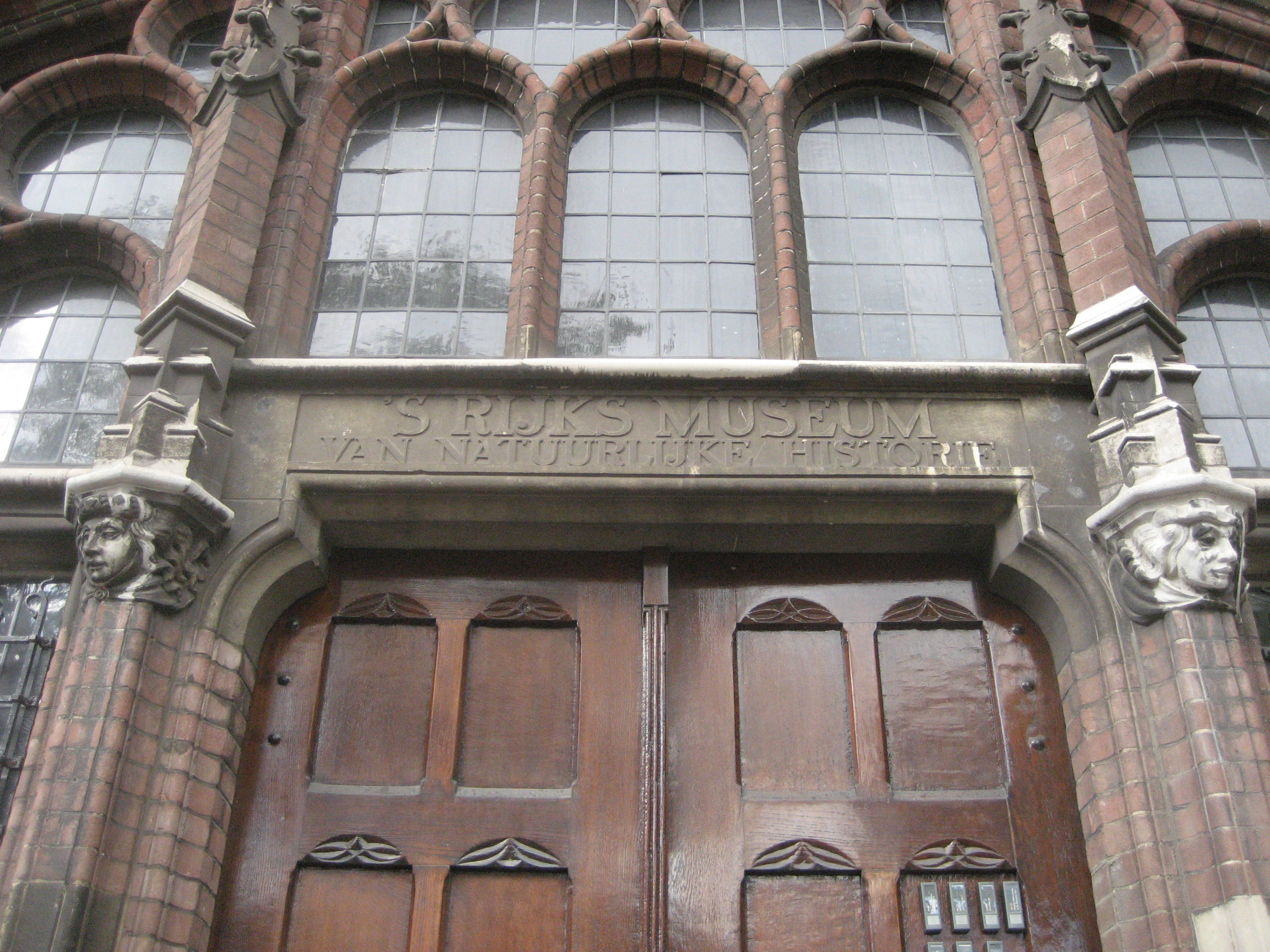
Raamsteeg building

The location was originally a hofje called Hof van Zessen. In 1815 plans were made to build a museum there (the first building called a "museum" in Leiden). It opened in 1820, and until 1913, the museum normally opened to the public on Sundays. In 1913, the museum moved to a new building, with very little room available for exhibits, and in 1950, this room was also closed. After that, there were a few opportunities for guided tours, attending lectures, and temporary exhibitions.

In 1976, a paper, "Towards a New Museum", was produced. This led to the museum taking on more of a central curating role, lending pieces from its collection to other museums. The Rijksmuseum van Natuurlijke Historie and the Rijksmuseum van Geologie en Mineralogie merged in 1984. A permanent public exhibition was still not present. That came in 1986, when the so-called "National Presentation" in the field of natural history was commissioned by the Dutch government. Planning began for a new building, which was completed in 1990 and launched in 1998 as "Naturalis".

== Buildings and interior ==
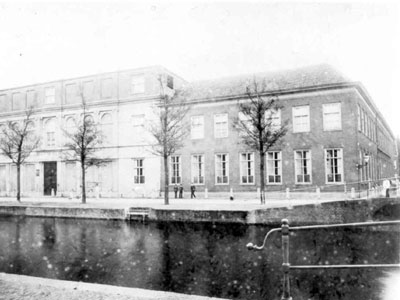
1820-1913: Building Papengracht/Rapenburg

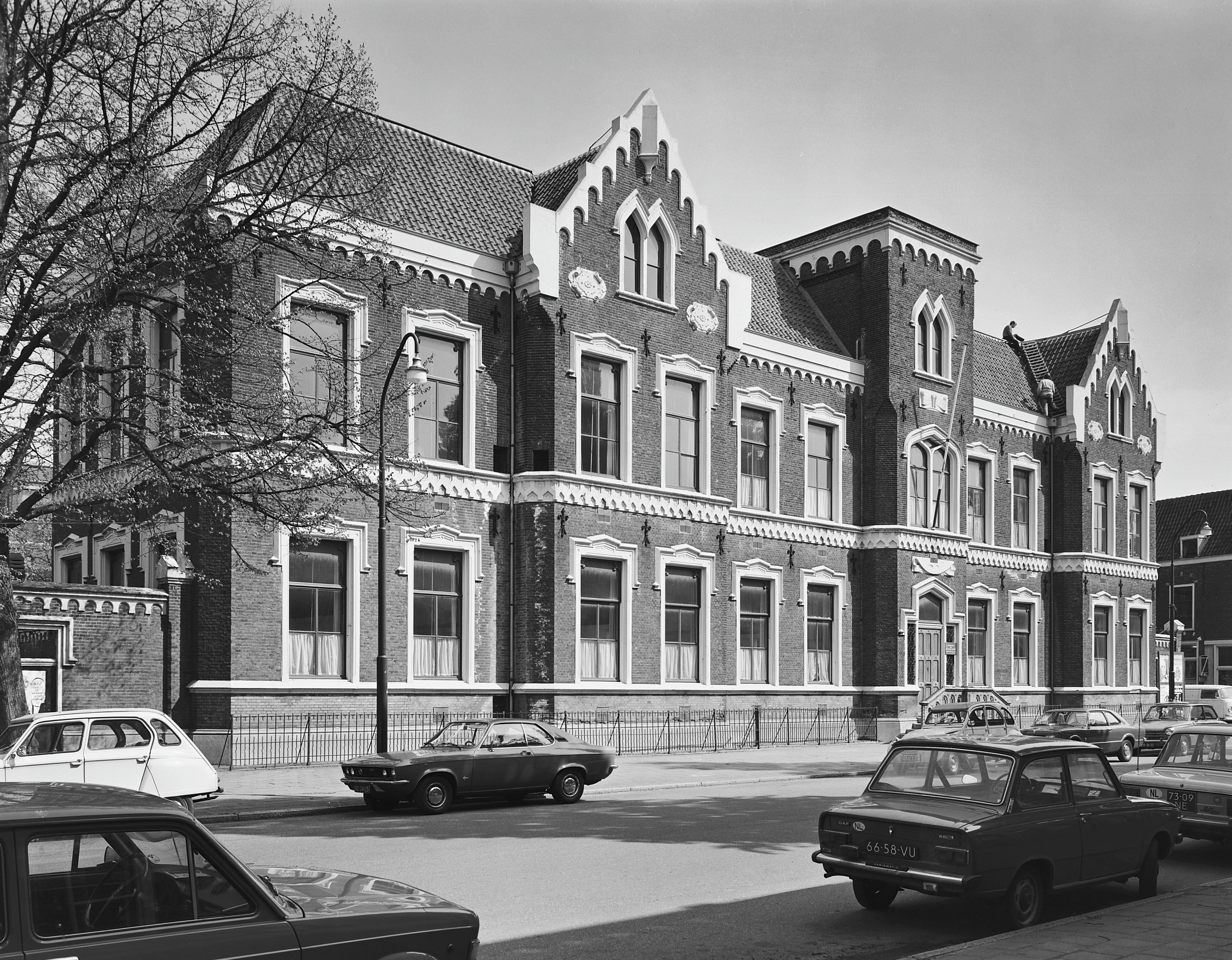
1913-1990: Building Doezastraat/corner Raamsteeg

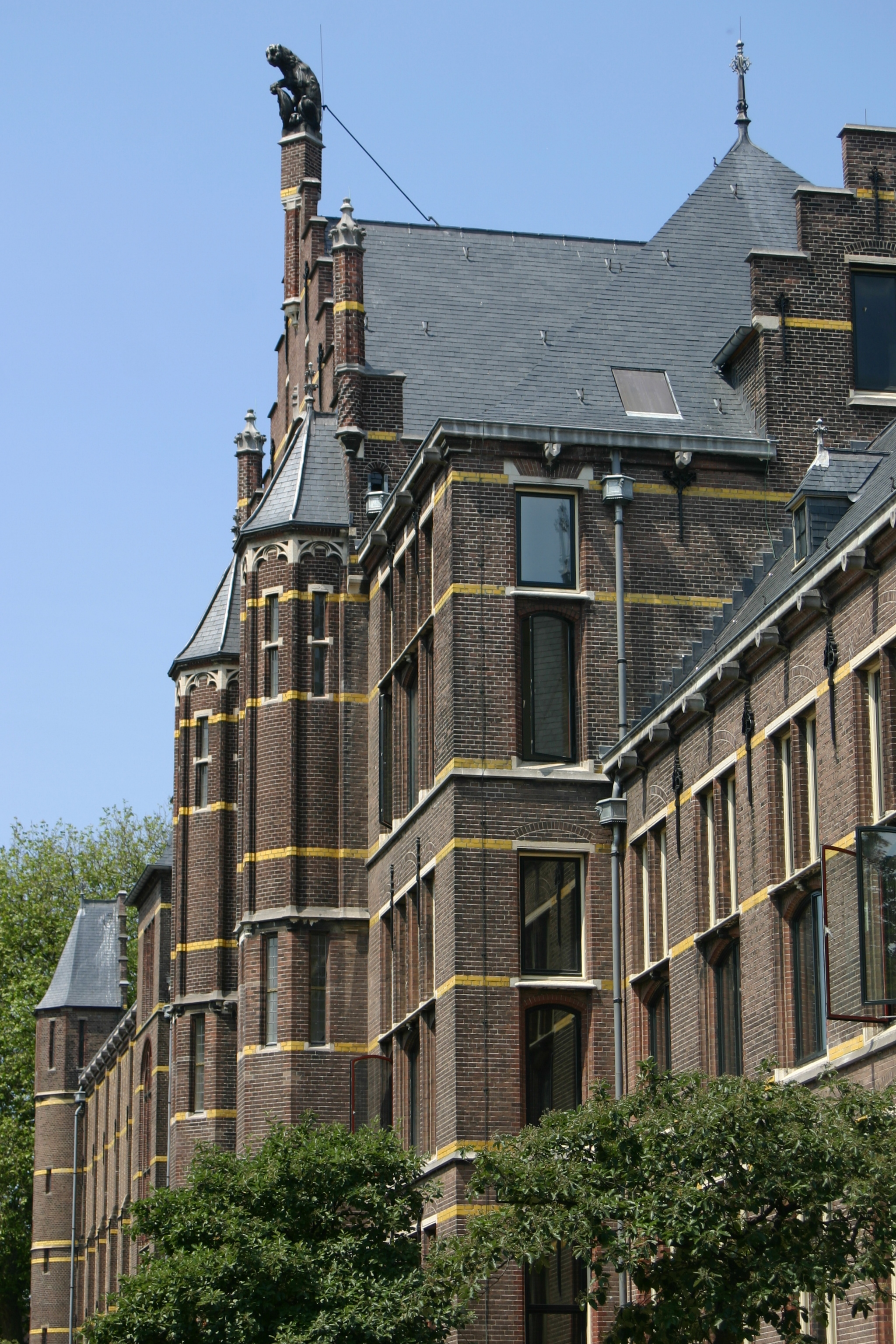
1913-1990: Raamsteeg side

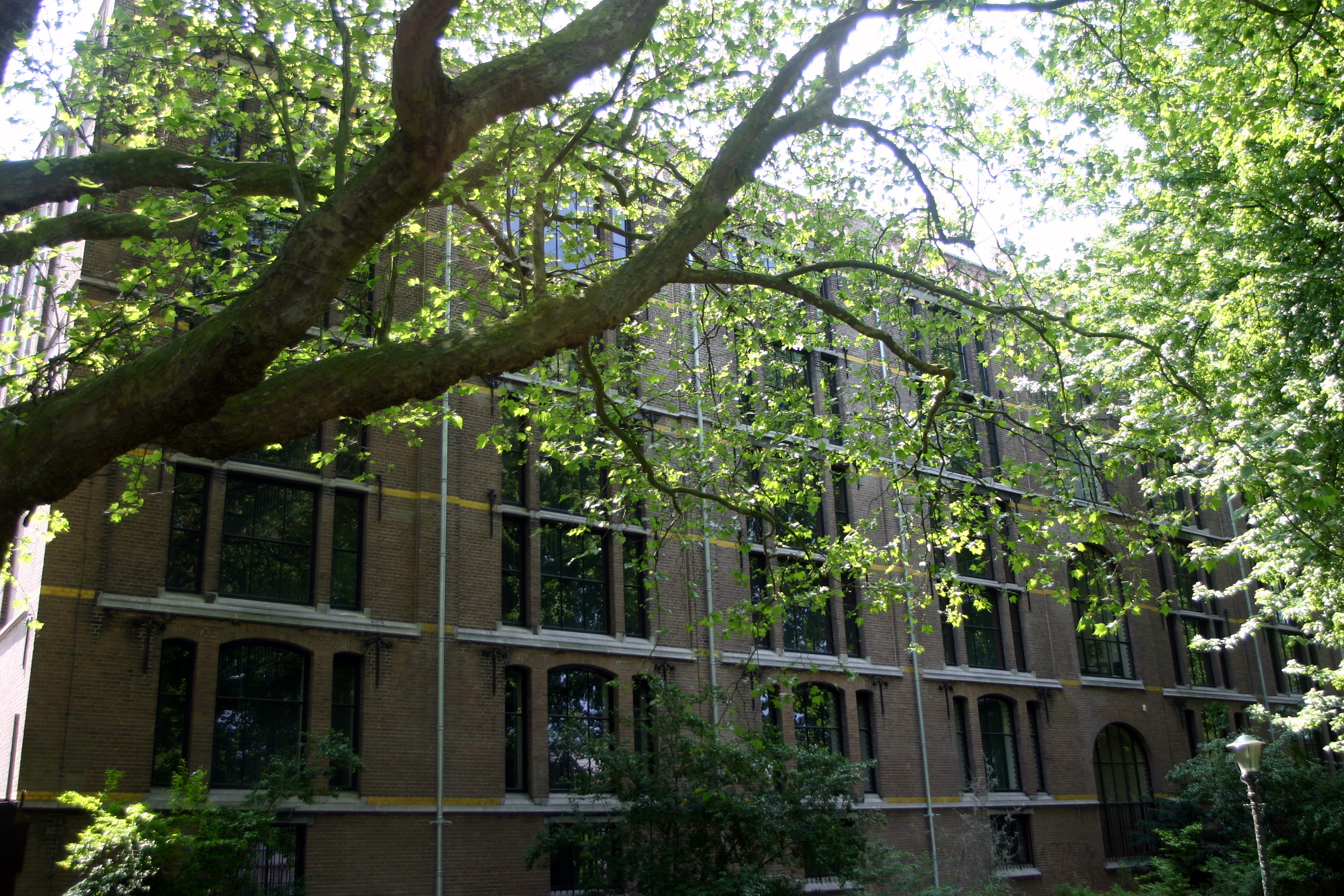
1913-1990: "Dry warehouse", near the Van der Werffpark

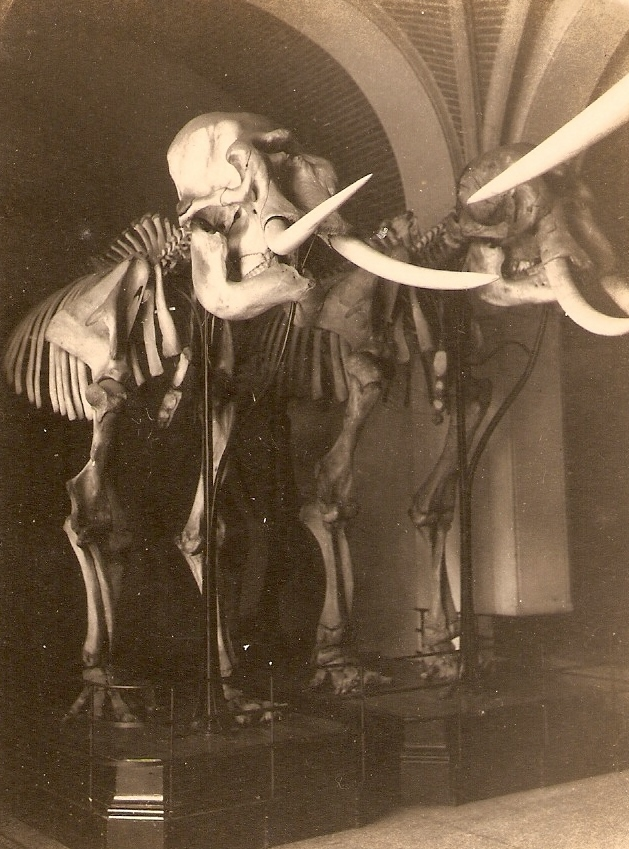
Hall with two elephant skeletons

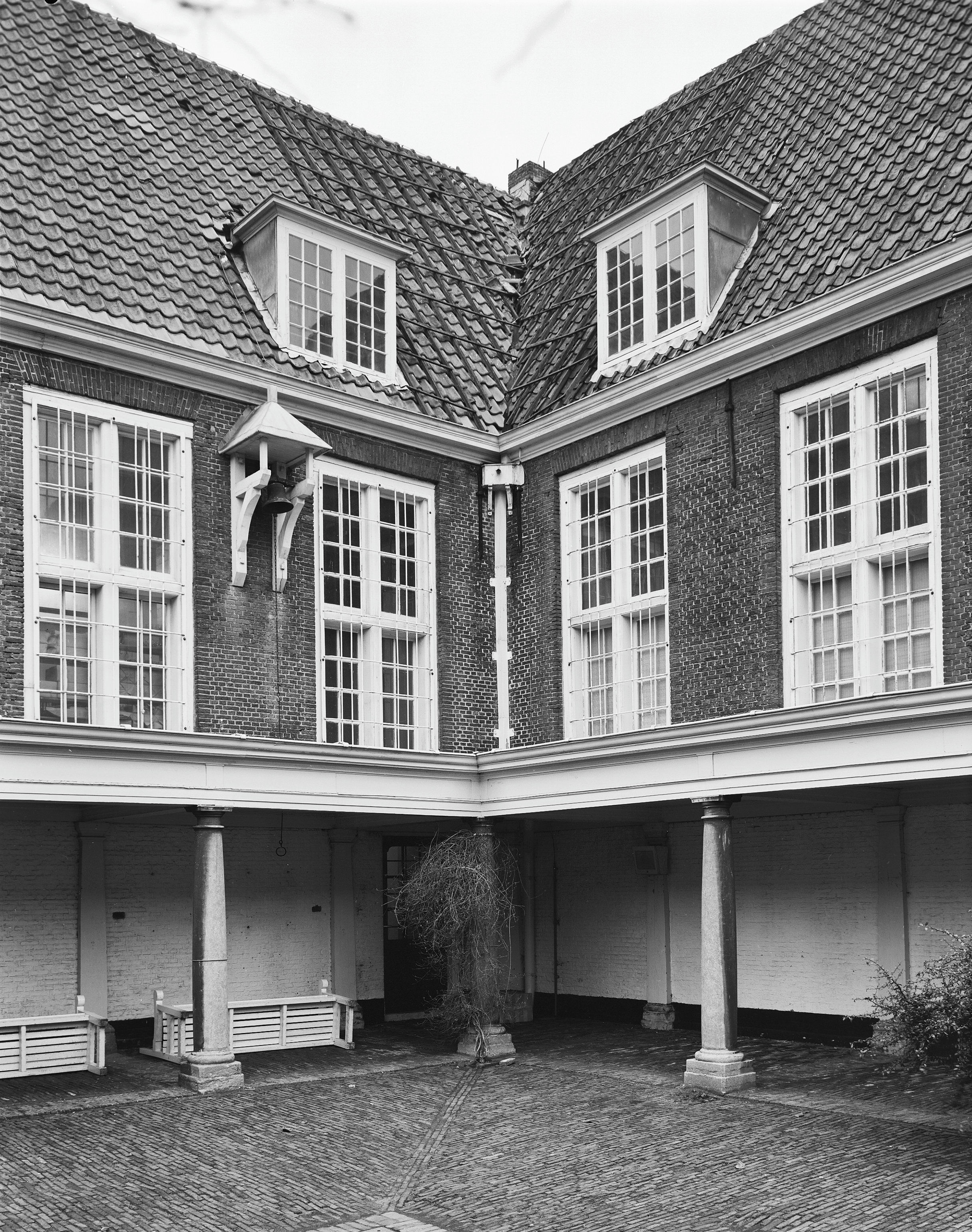
Pesthuis Leiden

== Former Directors ==
- Coenraad Jacob Temminck 1820 - 1858
- Hermann Schlegel 1858 - 1884
- Fredericus Anna Jentink 1884 - 1913
- Eduard Daniel van Oort 1913 - 1933
- Hilbrand Boschma 1933 - 1958
- Leo Brongersma 1958 - 1972
- Willem Vervoort 1972 - 1982
- Jacobus Theodorus Wiebes 1982 - 1989
- T. de Caluwé (?) 1989 - 1991
- W. van der Weiden 1991 - 2003

== Contributing scientists ==
- Marinus Boeseman
- Heinrich Boie
- Johann Büttikofer
- Rudolf van Eecke
- Berend George Escher
- Matthijs Freudenthal
- Otto Finsch
- Agatha Gijzen
- Wilhem de Haan
- James Edmund Harting
- Koos den Hartog
- Jan Adrianus Herklots
- Lipke Holthuis
- Johan Coenraad van Hasselt
- George Junge
- Heinrich Kuhl
- Jacob van der Land
- Heinrich Christian Macklot
- Johannes Govertus de Man
- Karl Martin
- Gerlof Fokko Mees
- Salomon Müller
- Dirk Noordam
- Coenraad Ritsema
- Willem Roelofs
- Adolph Cornelis van Bruggen
- Jacobus van der Vecht
- Samuel Constantinus Snellen van Vollenhoven
- G. van der Zanden

== Contributing artists ==
- John Gerrard Keulemans
- Marinus Adrianus Koekkoek the Younger
- Joseph Smit
- Joseph Wolf

== Contributing to collections ==
- Coenraad Jacob Temminck
- Pieter Bleeker
- Eugène Dubois
- Curt Eisner
- Oliver Erichson Janson
- Franz Wilhelm Junghuhn
- Thure Kumlien
- Pierre Millière
- Hendrik Pel
- Walter Karl Johann Roepke
- Hermann von Rosenberg
- Gerard van Rossem
- Philipp Franz von Siebold
- Hermanus Gerardus Maria Teunissen
- François Le Vaillant

== Varia ==
- Stephen Jay Gould depicts his visit to the Raamsteeg building in Dinosaur in a Haystack in his essay "Four Antelopes of the Apocalypse".

== See also ==
- Scripta Geologica
- Zoologische Mededelingen
- Zoologische Verhandelingen
