= Mitrella broderipii =

Scientific classification
- Kingdom: Animalia
- Phylum: Mollusca
- Class: Gastropoda
- Subclass: Caenogastropoda
- Order: Neogastropoda
- Superfamily: Buccinoidea
- Family: Columbellidae
- Genus: Mitrella
- Species: M. broderipii

Binomial name
- Mitrella broderipii (Sowerby G.B. I, 1844)

Synonyms
- Columbella (Mitrella) broderipi [sic] (misspelling of broderipii Sowerby...); Columbella broderipii G. B. Sowerby I, 1844 (original combination); Mitrella hidalgoi Monterosato, 1889; Mitrella hidalgoi var. albida Monterosato, 1889; Mitrella ocellina (Nordsieck, 1975)·(junior synonym); Nitidella ocellina F. Nordsieck, 1975; Pusionella scripta F. Nordsieck, 1975

Species of gastropod

Mitrella broderipii is a species of sea snail in the family Columbellidae, the dove snails.
