= Stereostele =

Scientific classification
- Kingdom: Animalia
- Phylum: Mollusca
- Class: Gastropoda
- Order: Stylommatophora
- Family: Streptaxidae
- Subfamily: Orthogibbinae
- Genus: Stereostele; Pilsbry, 1919
- Species: S. nevilli

Binomial name
- Stereostele nevilli (Adams, 1868)

Synonyms
- Ennea (Elma) Nevilli Adams, 1868; Streptosele (Elma) Nevilli; Streptosele (Elma) Nevilli var. dubia Wiegmann, 1898; Streptosele (Stereosele) nevilli; Streptosele nevilli

Species of gastropod

Stereostele nevilli is a species of air-breathing land snails, terrestrial pulmonate gastropod mollusks in the family Streptaxidae.

Stereostele nevilli is the only species in the genus Stereostele.

== Subspecies ==
Subspecies of Stereostele nevilli include:

- Stereostele nevilli nevilli (Adams, 1868)
- Stereostele nevilli parvidentata Gerlach & Bruggen, 1999

== Distribution ==
Stereostele nevilli is endemic to the Seychelles.
