= Dedza Mountain =

Mountain in Malawi

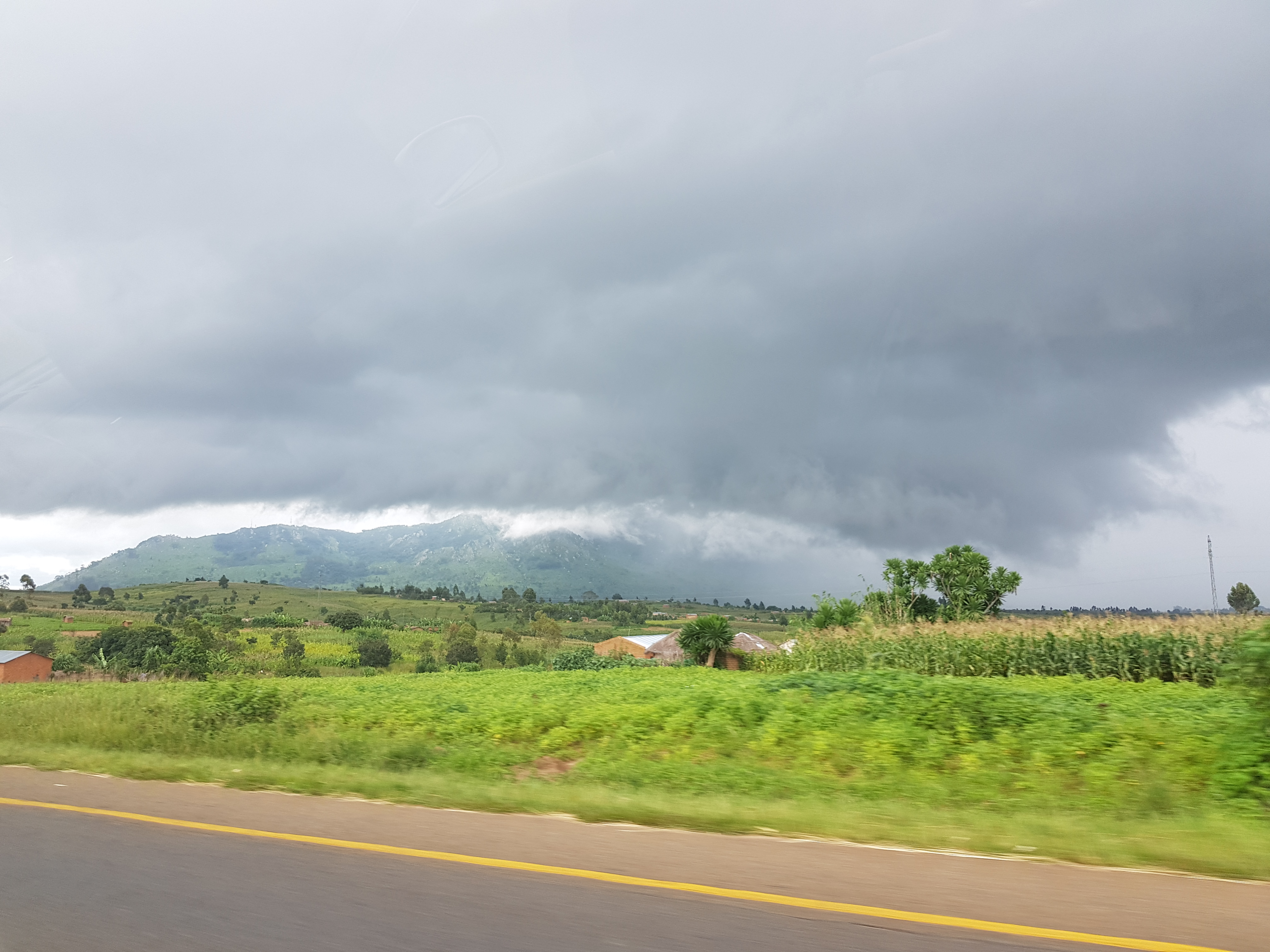

Highest point
- Elevation: 2,198 m (7,211 ft)
- Prominence: 1,120 m (3,670 ft)
- Listing: Ribu
- Coordinates: 14.339°S 34.333°E

Geography
- Location within Malawi
- Location: Malawi

Dedza Mountain is a mountain in central Malawi. It is located in Dedza District, just north of the town of Dedza.

Dedza Mountain's peak reaches 2198 meters elevation.

Dedza Mountain Forest Reserve was established in 1926, and covers an area of 2917 ha. Plantations of introduced pine trees cover much of the mountain, but there are remnant patches of native montane evergreen forest near the summit, and riparian forests in ravines. The native forests are home to numerous epiphytic orchids and other species.
