= List of non-marine molluscs of Seychelles =

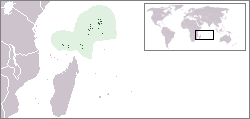
Location of Seychelles

The non-marine molluscs of Seychelles are a part of the molluscan wildlife of Seychelles.

== Freshwater gastropods ==
Paludomidae

- Paludomus ajanensis Morelet, 1860

== Land gastropods ==
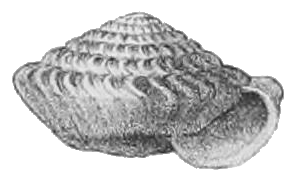
endemic Careoradula perelegans is the only terrestrial gastropod without radula

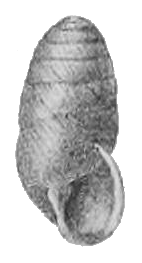
endemic Edentulina moreleti is the only one known herbivore streptaxid

Streptaxidae - There are 20 species of Streptaxidae on the Seychelles. Seven genera of Streptaxidae are endemic to the Seychelles: Stereostele, Imperturbatia, Silhouettia, Careoradula, Augustula, Priodiscus and Acanthennea.

1. Acanthennea erinacea (Martens, 1898) - endemic
2. Augustula braueri (Martens, 1898) - endemic
3. Careoradula perelegans (Martens, 1898) - endemic
4. Conturbatia crenata Gerlach, 2001 - endemic to Frégate Island, possibly extinct
5. Edentulina dussumieri (Dufo, 1840) - subspecies: Edentulina dussumieri dussumieri (Dufo, 1840); Edentulina dussumieri reservae Gerlach & Bruggen, 1999; Edentulina dussumieri silhouettae Gerlach & Bruggen, 1999; Edentulina dussumieri praslina Gerlach & Bruggen, 1999. The subspecies praslina is only known as subfossil.
6. Edentulina moreleti (Adams, 1868) - endemic
7. Glabrennea gardineri (Sykes, 1909) - endemic
8. Glabrennea silhouettensis (Verdcourt, 1994) - endemic
9. Glabrennea thomasseti (Sykes, 1909) - endemic
10. Gonaxis quadrilateralis Preston, 1910 / Gonaxis (Macrogonaxis) quadrilateralis (Preston, 1910) / Macrogonaxis quadrilateralis - introduced in 1958 to biological control two species of Achatina, but it has failed
11. Huttonella bicolor (Hutton, 1834)
12. Imperturbatia constans (Martens, 1898) - endemic
13. Imperturbatia violescens (Martens, 1898) - endemic - Gerlach & Bruggen (1999) have spelled the specific name as Imperturbatia violascens
14. Priodiscus costatus - endemic
15. Priodiscus serratus (Adams, 1868) - endemic
16. Priodiscus spinatus - endemic
17. Seychellaxis souleyetianus (Petit, 1841) - endemic
18. Silhouettia silhouettae (Martens, 1898) - endemic
19. Stereostele nevilli (Adams, 1868) - endemic - subspecies: Stereostele nevilli nevilli (Adams, 1868) and Stereostele nevilli parvidentata Gerlach & Bruggen, 1999
20. Streptostele acicula (Morelet, 1877)

== See also ==
- List of marine molluscs of Seychelles
- List of non-marine molluscs of Zanzibar
- List of non-marine molluscs of Mauritius
- List of non-marine molluscs of Réunion
- List of non-marine molluscs of Comoros
- List of non-marine molluscs of Mayotte
- List of non-marine molluscs of Madagascar
