= Hoya excavata =

Scientific classification
- Kingdom: Plantae
- Clade: Tracheophytes
- Clade: Angiosperms
- Clade: Eudicots
- Clade: Asterids
- Order: Gentianales
- Family: Apocynaceae
- Genus: Hoya
- Species: H. excavata

Binomial name
- Hoya excavata Teijsm. & Binn.

Synonyms
- Hoya cunninghamii Teijsm. & Binn.

Species of plant

Hoya excavata is a species of flowering plant in the family Apocynaceae. It is native to Sulawesi and the Moluccas in Indonesia. A climber with red or pink flowers, it is found in the wet tropics. It is occasionally kept as a houseplant.
