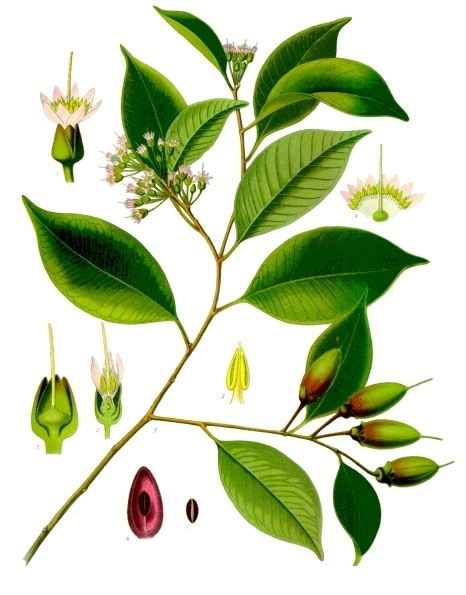

Conservation status
- Near Threatened (IUCN 3.1)

Scientific classification
- Kingdom: Plantae
- Clade: Embryophytes
- Clade: Tracheophytes
- Clade: Angiosperms
- Clade: Eudicots
- Clade: Asterids
- Order: Ericales
- Family: Sapotaceae
- Genus: Payena
- Species: P. leerii

Binomial name
- Payena leerii (Teijsm. & Binn.) Kurz

Synonyms
- List: Azaola leerii Teijsm. & Binn.; Hapaloceras arupa Hassk.; Hapaloceras leerii (Teijsm. & Binn.) Hassk.; Isonandra benjamina de Vriese; Isonandra lamponga Miq.; Keratephorus leerii (Teijsm. & Binn.) Hassk.; Madhuca leerii (Teijsm. & Binn.) Merr.; Payena benjamina (de Vriese) Pierre; Payena croixiana Pierre; Payena lamponga (Miq.) Burck

= Payena leerii =

Species of tree

Payena leerii is a tree in the family Sapotaceae.

== Description ==
Payena leerii grows up to 30 metres (100 ft) tall with a trunk diameter of up to 60 cm (24 in). The bark is greyish brown. The inflorescences bear up to eight flowers. The fruits are conical and measure up to 4 cm (1.6 in) long. The tree is a source of high-quality gutta-percha.

== Distribution and habitat ==
Payena leerii is found widely in Sumatra, Peninsular Malaysia, Borneo, Sulawesi and the Philippines. Its habitat is coastal lowland forests to 650 m (2,100 ft) elevation.

== Conservation ==
Payena leerii has been assessed as near threatened on the IUCN Red List. It is at risk from conversion of its habitat for urban development and agriculture. The species is present in Borneo's Bako National Park, Kinabalu Park and Mount Palung National Park, which affords a level of protection in these places.
