= Payena longipedicellata =

Conservation status
- Vulnerable (IUCN 3.1)

Scientific classification
- Kingdom: Plantae
- Clade: Tracheophytes
- Clade: Angiosperms
- Clade: Eudicots
- Clade: Asterids
- Order: Ericales
- Family: Sapotaceae
- Genus: Payena
- Species: P. longipedicellata

Binomial name
- Payena longipedicellata Brace ex King & Gamble

Synonyms
- Keratephorus longipedicellata (Brace ex King & Gamble) Teijsm. & Binn.

Species of tree

Payena longipedicellata is a tree in the family Sapotaceae. The specific epithet longipedicellata means 'long pedicel', referring to the flower.

== Description ==
Payena longipedicellata grows up to 30 metres (100 ft) tall with a trunk diameter of up to 60 cm (24 in). The bark is black. The inflorescences bear up to three flowers. The fruits are ovoid, and measure up to 3 cm (1.2 in) long.

== Distribution and habitat ==
Payena longipedicellata is native to Peninsular Malaysia and Borneo. Its habitat is lowland mixed dipterocarp forests.

== Conservation ==
Payena longipedicellata has been assessed as vulnerable on the IUCN Red List. It is at risk from conversion of its habitat for palm oil plantations. The species is present in Peninsular Malaysia's Taman Negara national park, which affords a level of protection here.
