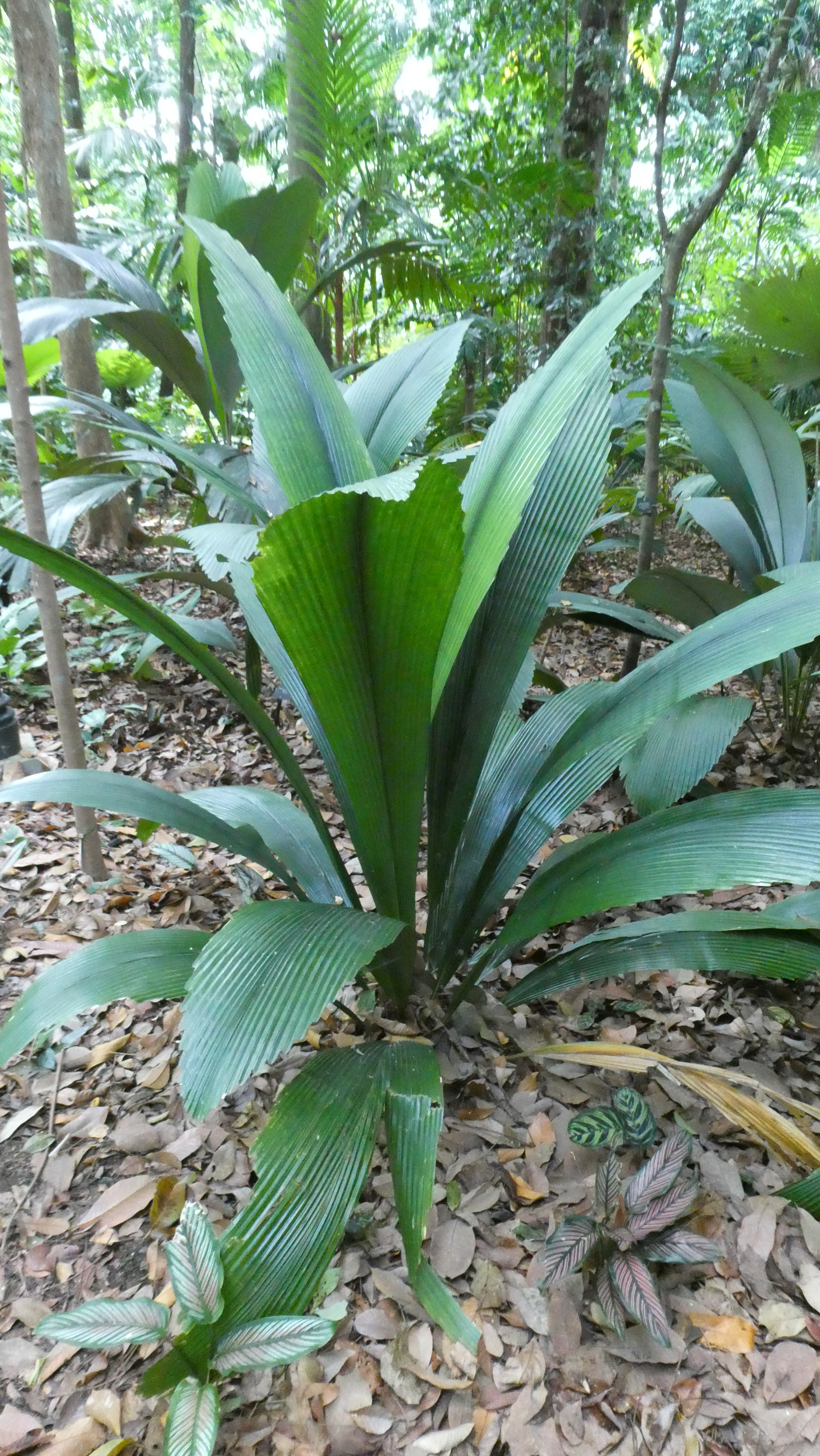

Scientific classification
- Kingdom: Plantae
- Clade: Tracheophytes
- Clade: Angiosperms
- Clade: Monocots
- Clade: Commelinids
- Order: Arecales
- Family: Arecaceae
- Genus: Johannesteijsmannia
- Species: J. lanceolata

Binomial name
- Johannesteijsmannia lanceolata J.Dransf.

= Johannesteijsmannia lanceolata =

Species of palm

Johannesteijsmannia lanceolata, commonly known as the slender joey or the narrow-leafed umbrella palm, is a species of palm in the family Arecaceae. It was first described 1972 by John Dransfield. The slender joey is endemic to Malaysia, where it is referred to by the local Orang Asli communities as chica.

== Description ==
Johannesteijsmannia lanceolata is a medium-sized palm that grows in the forest understory with lance-shaped leaves and no visible stem. It grows to a maximum 3.5 metres (11 ft) in height, with the crown of the plant growing to a maximum width of 5 metres (16 ft). The plant has no visible trunk, referred to as acaulescent in form, as the trunk is underground. The trunk is solitary and has leaf scars if visible. The leaf sheath is fibrous, around 25 centimetres (9.8 in), withering to form a brown network of fibres.

The large glossy leaves, lamina, of the plant are 3.5 metres (11 ft) in length and have a width of 30 centimetres (12 in). The leaves of the palm are narrower compared to other members of the same genus. The fronds are lance-shaped, contributing to the naming of the palm, which denote the shape of the fronds. Leaf margins are lined with small sharp teeth, along the midrib, primary nerves, and underside the leaves are covered in brown-scurfy scales. The petiole of the leaves have two yellow stripes. The leaves of the palm are used by local Indigenous peoples for roof thatching. Due to the rarity of the palm, this is only done during celebration feasts, known as kenduri in the local language.

The inflorescence is divided into 3 to 6 branches and are sessile, attached to the base of the palm. The flowers are creamy white in colour, with broad, papillate petals which are 1 millimetre (0.039 in) in length and are described as "very thick". The inflorescence additionally features tubular, inflated bracts. The sweetly scented flowers attract insect pollinators such as black ants, flies (Cecidomyiidae and Phoridae), and stingless bees (Trigona sp.) which facilitate the autogamy of the flowers.

The fruits can grow up to 3.4 centimetres (1.3 in) in diameter, are brown in colour, globular in shape, and covered in short warts or corky protuberances. The period of maturity from flower to fruit takes about fourteen to fifteen months. Compared to the other members of the genus Johannesteijsmannia, it produces few seeds, making it harder to find than other members of the genus Johannesteijsmannia.

== Range ==
The slender joey is endemic to Malaysia. It is found in the states of Negeri Sembilan, Pahang, and Selangor. It has an extremely limited distribution, being restricted to the Sungei Lalang watershed in the Malay Peninsula.

=== Habitat ===
An understory palm, the slender joey is found in sites with well drained soils in river valleys. Some specimens were found growing in logged forest areas.

In cultivation, the slender joey requires filtered light and a moist, humid environment and requires soils with good drainage.

== Human interactions ==
The slender joey is used by the local Orang Asli communities for roof thatching, known locally as atap. In Selangor, in the communities of Donglai, Lalang Baru, Serendah, it is collected once every six or more months. In Negeri Sembilan, in the community of Ulu Kelaka, it is collected rarely, only during kenduri rituals.

=== Conservation ===
Under the International Union for Conservation of Nature's Red List 3.1 criteria, the slender joey is listed as Endangered. It was designated as such due to its endemicity and its limited extent of occurrence, as well as the small population size. For its largest subpopulation, it is numbered at 250 individuals.

It is threatened by illegal poaching and seed collection due to the commercialization of members of its genus as ornamentals. It is also threatened by the conversion of forest habitat into palm oil plantations and rubber farms, dam building, highway construction, and logging. In addition to increasing the protection of wild populations, one action proposed to help preserve the species is to create a domestic population, and artificially extend the palm's range.

Under the provisions of the Customs (Prohibition of Export) Order 1998, overseas export of the slender joey is banned. Collection of the plant and its seeds are allowed with permissions granted from the relevant authorities.

== Etymology ==
The genus name honours Johannes Elias Teijsmann, a botanist formerly working at the Buitenzorg Botanical Gardens, currently known as the Bogor Botanical Gardens. The specific epithet, lanceolata, means "lance-shaped", and refers to the lance-shaped fronds that the tree has.

In the states of Selangor and Negeri Sembilan it is commonly known as the Slender Joey Palm. It is also known as the Narrow-leafed Umbrella palm in English. In the Malay language among the Indigenous Orang Asli communities, it is called chica in the states of Selangor and Negeri Sembilan, while in Johor it is referred to as payung, which refers to all four Johannesteijsmannia members found in the state.
