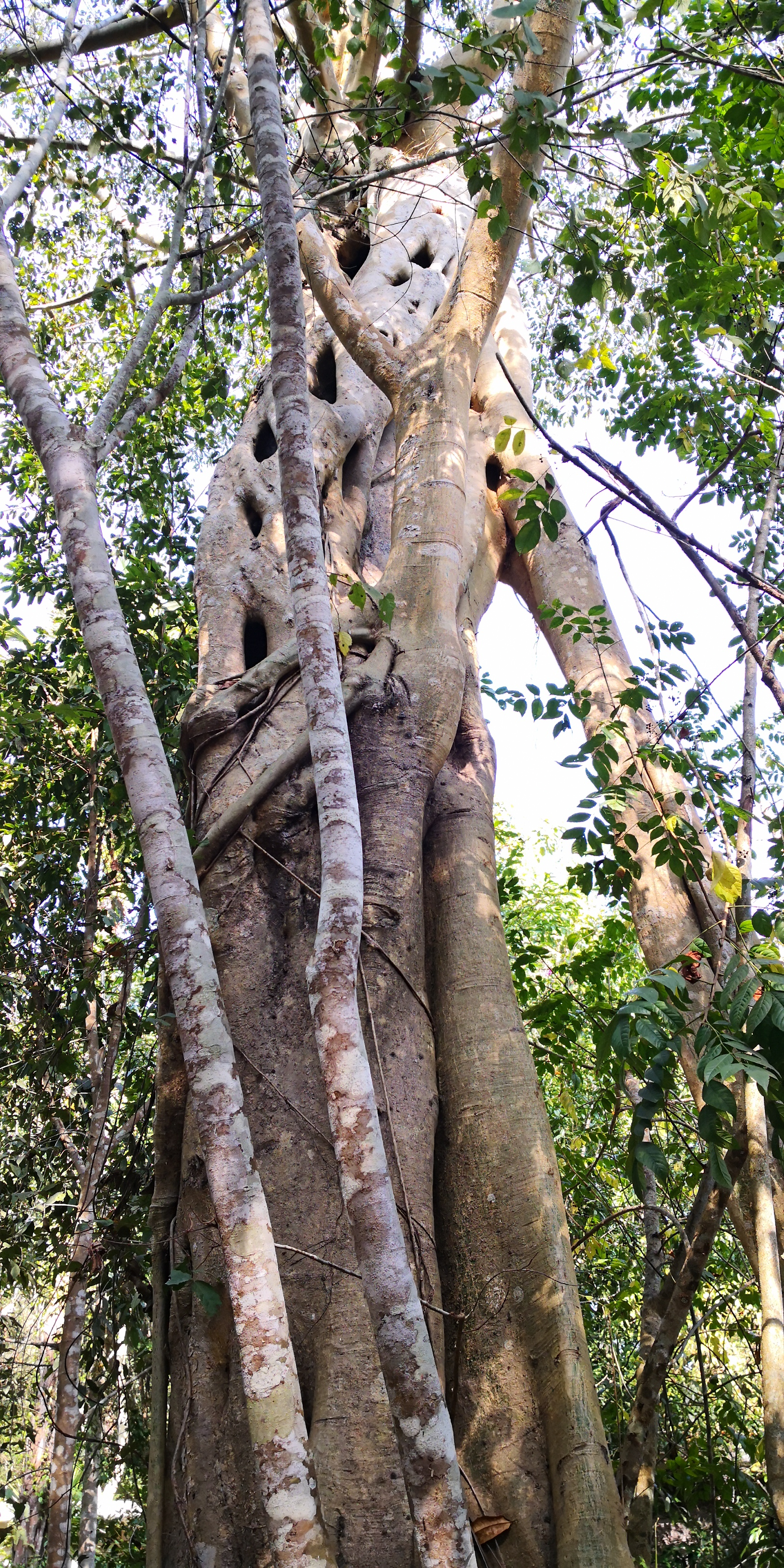
- Mengla, Xishuangbanna, Yunnan

Conservation status
- Least Concern (IUCN 3.1)

Scientific classification
- Kingdom: Plantae
- Clade: Tracheophytes
- Clade: Angiosperms
- Clade: Eudicots
- Clade: Rosids
- Order: Rosales
- Family: Moraceae
- Genus: Ficus
- Subgenus: F. subg. Urostigma
- Species: F. maclellandii

Binomial name
- Ficus maclellandii King

Synonyms
- Ficus maclellandii var. rhododendrifolia (Miq.) Corner; Ficus rhododendrifolia (Miq.) Miq.; Ficus thorelii Gagnep.; Urostigma rhododendrifolium Miq.

= Ficus maclellandii =

Species of flowering plant

Ficus maclellandii (common name Alii fig or banana-leaf fig) is a species of fig plant in the family Moraceae. It is native to eastern India, Bangladesh, Indochina, Peninsular Malaysia, and Yunnan in south-central China. It is an evergreen often grown as a houseplant in temperate climates. The leaves are 8–13 cm and uniquely dimorphic; with narrow leaves on the lower, sterile branches and broader leaves on the higher branches.

The species was described by George King in 1887.

== Cultivar ==
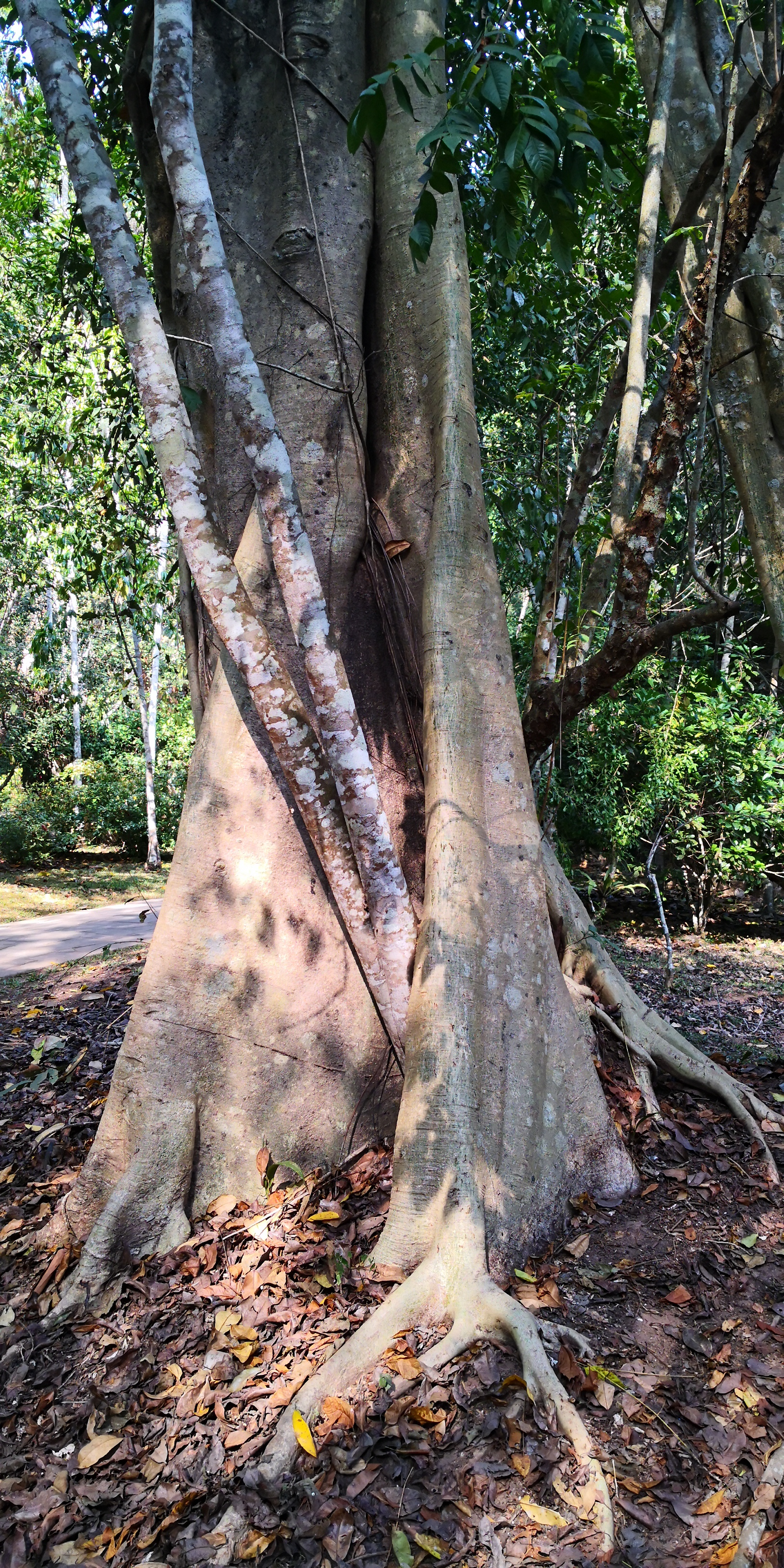
Stem with bark

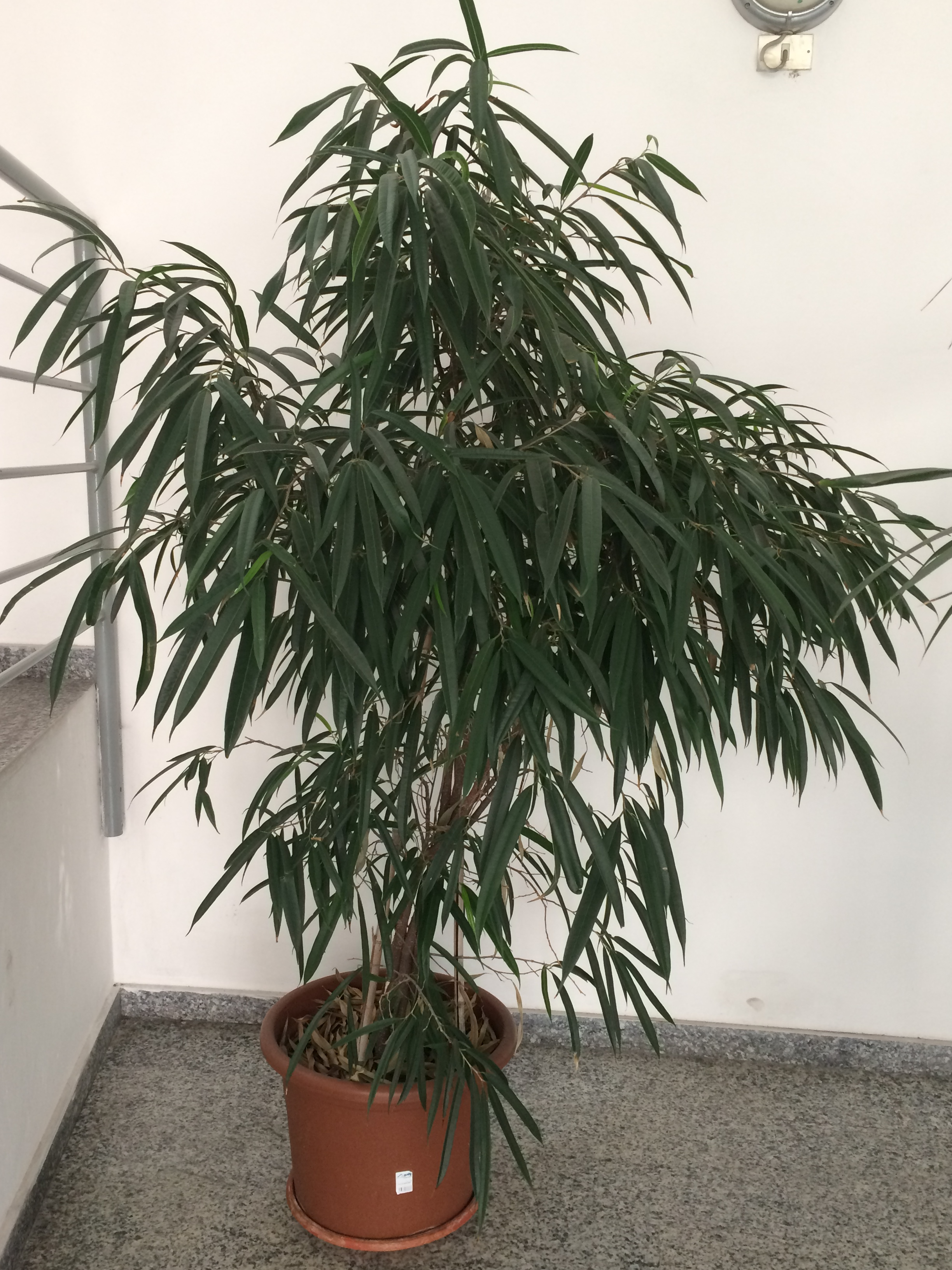
'Alii' cultivar

The most common cultivar is 'Alii' which was originally introduced in Hawaii. In the past this cultivar was often misidentified as F. binnendijkii or under the spurious name Ficus longifolia.
