= Payena ferruginea =

Conservation status
- Least Concern (IUCN 3.1)

Scientific classification
- Kingdom: Plantae
- Clade: Embryophytes
- Clade: Tracheophytes
- Clade: Angiosperms
- Clade: Eudicots
- Clade: Asterids
- Order: Ericales
- Family: Sapotaceae
- Genus: Payena
- Species: P. ferruginea

Binomial name
- Payena ferruginea J.T.Pereira

Species of tree

Payena ferruginea is a tree in the family Sapotaceae. The specific epithet ferruginea means 'rust-coloured', referring to the indumentum.

== Description ==
Payena ferruginea grows up to 35 metres (110 ft) tall with a trunk diameter of up to 75 cm (30 in). The bark is dark brown to grey. The inflorescences bear up to nine flowers. The fruits are round to ellipsoid, up to 3.5 cm (1.4 in) long. The timber is used commercially.

== Distribution and habitat ==
Payena ferruginea is endemic to Borneo. Its habitat is mixed dipterocarp forests, to 450 m (1,500 ft) elevation.

== Conservation ==
Payena ferruginea has been assessed as least concern on the IUCN Red List. However, forests in Borneo are threatened by logging and mining and by conversion of land for rubber and palm oil production. Payena ferruginea is specifically harvested for its timber. The species is present in some protected areas, such as Ulu Temburong National Park in Brunei.
