= Payena khoonmengiana =

Conservation status
- Vulnerable (IUCN 3.1)

Scientific classification
- Kingdom: Plantae
- Clade: Tracheophytes
- Clade: Angiosperms
- Clade: Eudicots
- Clade: Asterids
- Order: Ericales
- Family: Sapotaceae
- Genus: Payena
- Species: P. khoonmengiana

Binomial name
- Payena khoonmengiana J.T.Pereira

Species of tree

Payena khoonmengiana is a tree in the family Sapotaceae. It is endemic to Borneo and known only from Sabah.

It grows up to 15 metres (50 ft) tall with a trunk diameter of up to 13 centimetres (5 in). The bark is reddish brown. Inflorescences bear one or two flowers. The fruits are ovoid, up to 8 cm (3 in) long. The tree is named for forest botanist Meng Wong Khoon.

The tree is known only from the Tawai Forest Reserve and Sg Talibu Forest Reserve in Sabah. It has a small range, and its estimated area of occupancy (AOO) and extent of occurrence (EOO) are both 20 km^{2}. Its habitat is lowland rain forest from 265 to 422 metres elevation.
