= Payena obscura =

Conservation status
- Vulnerable (IUCN 3.1)

Scientific classification
- Kingdom: Plantae
- Clade: Embryophytes
- Clade: Tracheophytes
- Clade: Angiosperms
- Clade: Eudicots
- Clade: Asterids
- Order: Ericales
- Family: Sapotaceae
- Genus: Payena
- Species: P. obscura

Binomial name
- Payena obscura Burck

Species of tree

Payena obscura is a tree in the family Sapotaceae, native to Southeast Asia.The specific epithet obscura means 'obscure', referring to the leaf veins.

== Description ==
Payena obscura grows up to 30 metres (100 ft) tall, with a trunk diameter of up to 90 cm (35 in). The brownish bark is flaky to fissured. The leaves measure up to 16 cm (6 in) long. The inflorescences bear up to nine flowers. Gutta-percha may be made from the latex.

== Varieties ==
Two varieties of Payena obscura are recognised:

- Payena obscura var. havilandii (King & Gamble) J.T.Pereira – endemic to Borneo; in lowland dipterocarp forests to elevations of 850 m (2,800 ft)
- Payena obscura var. obscura – native to Borneo, Peninsular Malaysia, Singapore and Sumatra; in lowland forests and in kerangas forests on ridges, to elevations of 1,200 m (4,000 ft)

== Conservation ==
Payena obscura has been assessed as vulnerable on the IUCN Red List. It is threatened by logging and mining and by production of rubber and palm oil. The species is present in some protected areas, such as Taman Negara National Park in Peninsular Malaysia.
