= Payena acuminata =

Conservation status
- Least Concern (IUCN 3.1)

Scientific classification
- Kingdom: Plantae
- Clade: Embryophytes
- Clade: Tracheophytes
- Clade: Angiosperms
- Clade: Eudicots
- Clade: Asterids
- Order: Ericales
- Family: Sapotaceae
- Genus: Payena
- Species: P. acuminata

Binomial name
- Payena acuminata (Blume) Pierre

Synonyms
- List: Kaukenia acuminata (Blume) Kuntze; Madhuca acuminata (Blume) Baehni; Mimusops acuminata Blume; Bassia balem Miq.; Bassia junghuhniana de Vriese; Bassia sericea Blume; Isonandra pulchra Burck; Isonandra sumatrana (Miq.) Burck; Payena balem (Miq.) Pierre; Payena junghuhniana (de Vriese) Pierre; Payena ornata S.Moore; Payena seicea var. pulchra (Burck) H.J.Lam; Payena sericea var. pulchra (Burck) H.J.Lam; Payena stipularis Burck; Payena sumatrana Miq.; Payena suringariana Burck; Payena teysmanniana Pierre

Species of tree

Payena acuminata is a tree in the family Sapotaceae. The specific epithet acuminata means 'tapering to a narrow point', referring to the leaf apex.

== Description ==
Payena acuminata grows up to 30 metres (100 ft) tall with a trunk diameter of up to 75 cm (30 in). The bark is brown. The inflorescences bear up to 20 flowers. The fruits are ellipsoid, and measure up to 4 cm (1.6 in) long.

== Distribution and habitat ==
Payena acuminata is native to Peninsular Thailand, Peninsular Malaysia, Borneo, Java and Sumatra. Its habitat is mixed dipterocarp forests to 400 m (1,300 ft) altitude.

== Uses ==
Payena acuminata is a source of gutta-percha. The timber is used commercially. The fruits are considered edible.

== Conservation ==
Payena acuminata has been assessed as least concern on the IUCN Red List. However there are threats to some of the species' habitats. Forests in Borneo are threatened by logging and mining and by conversion of land for rubber and palm oil production. Forest cover in Sumatra has steadily decreased. Payena acuminata is specifically harvested for its timber and gutta-percha. The species is present in some protected areas, such as Taman Negara National Park in Peninsular Malaysia.
