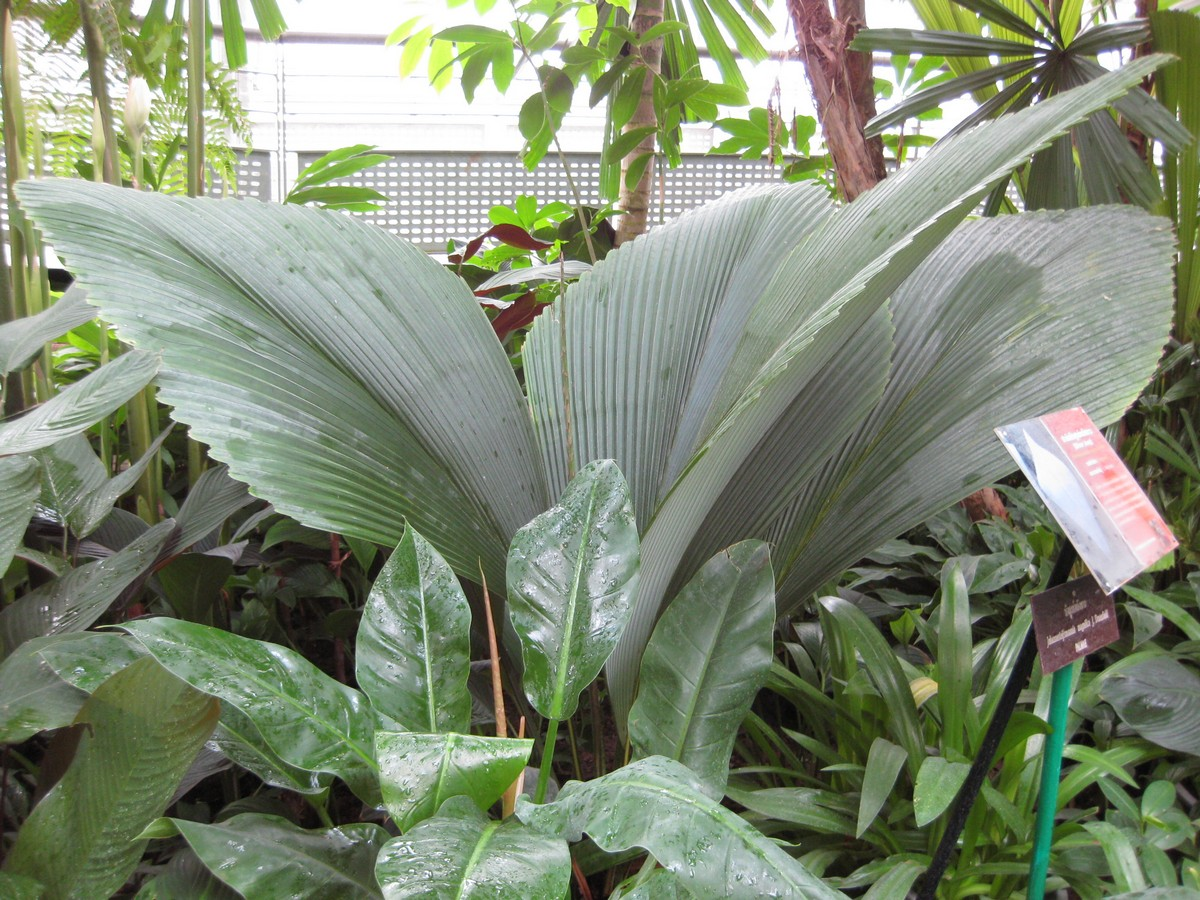

Scientific classification
- Kingdom: Plantae
- Clade: Tracheophytes
- Clade: Angiosperms
- Clade: Monocots
- Clade: Commelinids
- Order: Arecales
- Family: Arecaceae
- Tribe: Trachycarpeae
- Genus: Johannesteijsmannia
- Species: J. magnifica

Binomial name
- Johannesteijsmannia magnifica J.Dransf.

= Johannesteijsmannia magnifica =

Species of palm

Johannesteijsmannia magnifica, commonly known as the silver joey palm or segalok, is a perennial species of palm from Selangor, Perak, and Negeri Sembilan, Malaysia. It grows in primary forests in tropical lowlands, and is considered endangered. It was first described in 1972 by John Dransfield, but was known to and used by indigenous Malaysians before description.

== Description ==
This species of palm characterized by its flat spear-shaped leaves up to 3 meters in length and 2 meters in width, its acaulescent growth, and the silvery hairs on the underside of the leaves. It can grow up to 5 meters tall.

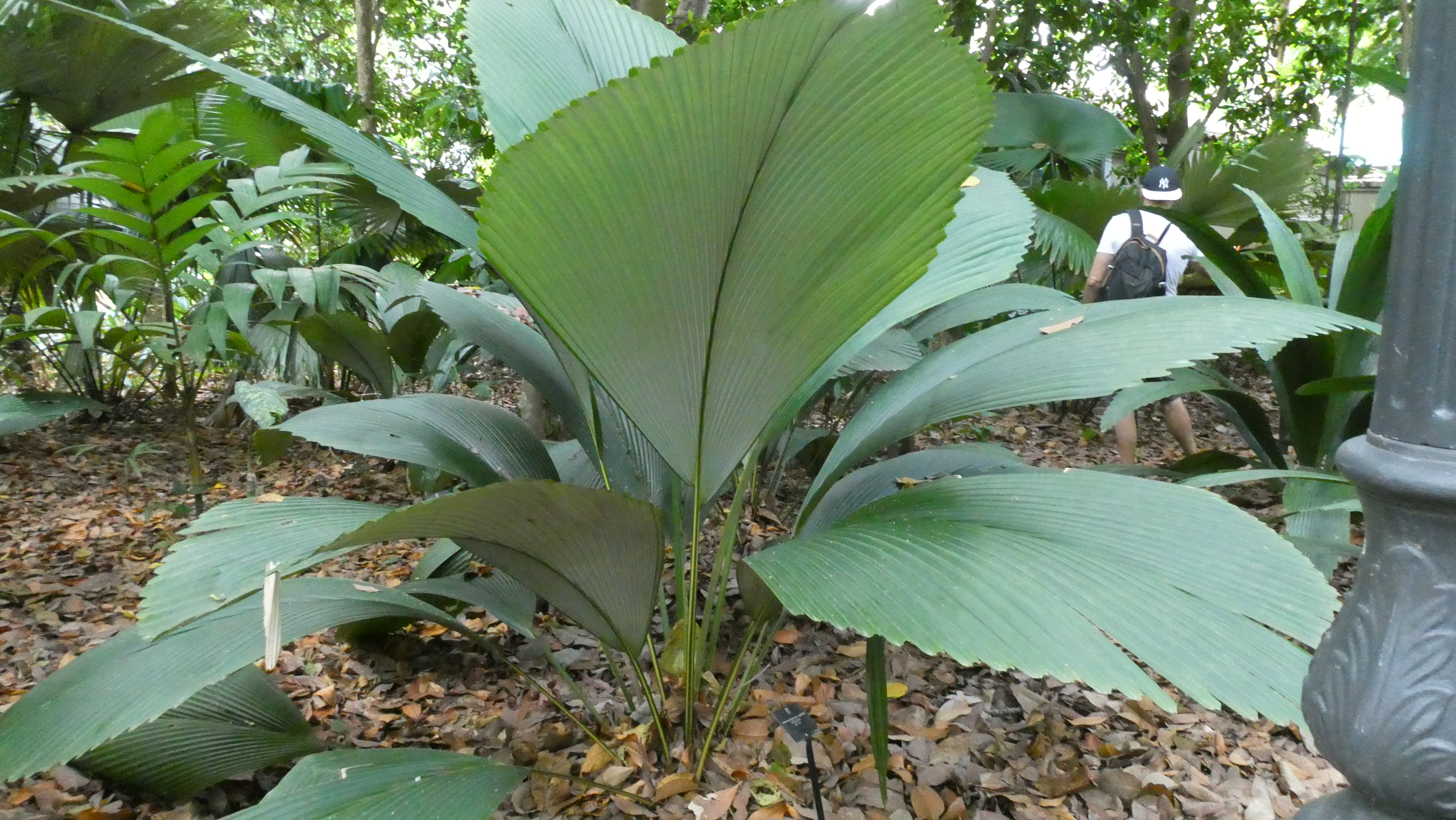
Image of acaulescent (stemless) habit and silvery underside

The inflorescences are axillary, and are described as having "comb-like" rachillae as a defining feature. The flowers themselves are intermediately sized for the genus, and the petals are flat and triangular in shape. They emerge from the center of the palm from under the layer of dead leaves, and turn from a white color to brown as the flowers age. The drooping raceme of flowers has a strong sweet-sour scent that attracts pollinators. The inflorescences individually last from 7-14 days, and fully bloom during the day.

The fruits change from pink and white to a light orange brown with age. They are round with corky protrusions and roughly 4 cm in diameter.

== Distribution and habitat ==
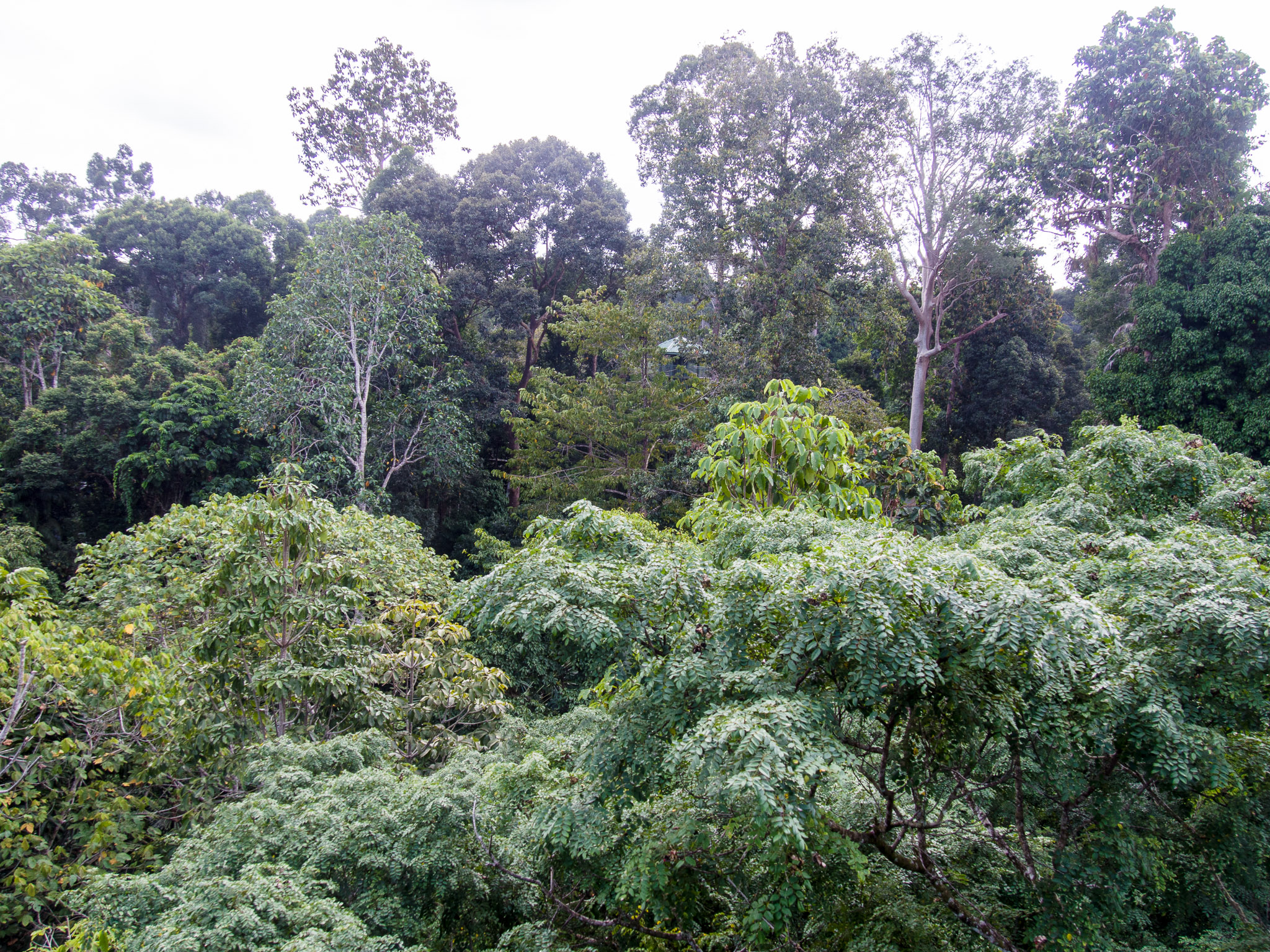
Tropical Dipterocarp forest habitat

This species is endemic to Malaysia, distributed throughout the western portion of the peninsula. It grows in valley bottoms and hill slopes in evergreen tropical lowland forest, with one site occurring on limestone. It prefers unlogged primary forests with high canopy cover, and juvenile recruitment in heavily logged groves is very low. Populations of J. magnifica tend to be densely populated, but isolated from other populations, with some groups of palms being confined to particular valleys. Dispersal between these populations is low, though genetic diversity within them remains relatively high.

It has been found at elevations between 120-500 meters above sea level.

== Ecology ==
J. magnifica is an understory plant, growing in dense populations in well-shaded areas. It flowers and fruits annually, peaking from February to April. The fruits mature from July through October, producing annually a mean of 82 fruits.

Pollinators of this species include stingless bees in the genus Trigona, flies, ants, thrips, and beetles. This species produces floral tannins to deter insect destruction of reproductive parts. Self-pollination is possible, and may be advantageous for very small populations of J. magnifica.

== Conservation ==
This species is considered endangered following the IUCN Red List Category and Criteria. Deforestation and development in their native habitats result in a declining but still-important threat to their populations. Illegal seed-collection for use in medicine or horticulture are also driving declines in the species.

Specific threats include dam building, the proliferation of palm oil plantations, highway construction, and logging. The disparate nature of their populations and low rates of dispersion mean that once one site is converted to unsuitable habitat, plants in that area are unlikely to reestablish. National and State parks within Malaysia offer protection from development, though plants in the Permanent Reserved Forests are susceptible to disturbance by logging. Dam building creates remnant populations of once contiguous populations.

== Human use ==
Indigenous communities in Malaysia, notably the Orang Asli, may use the fronds of the palm for roof thatching known as 'atap'. The seeds are not generally used for medicinal purposes among the community, though seeds may be collected for germination to be sold to private collectors, wholesalers, or nurseries.

The palm is also commonly grown for landscaping and horticulture outside of Malaysia, and is one of the most popular in their genus due to the impressive foliage. Their native habitat is very well shaded, and the palms do not tolerate sunlight. Domestication attempts by a private company, Malesiana Tropicals Sdn. Bhd., has resulted in less wild collection of seeds. The plant is sold in the south of the United States, Japan, and Taiwan.
