= Payena kapitensis =

Conservation status
- Critically Endangered (IUCN 3.1)

Scientific classification
- Kingdom: Plantae
- Clade: Tracheophytes
- Clade: Angiosperms
- Clade: Eudicots
- Clade: Asterids
- Order: Ericales
- Family: Sapotaceae
- Genus: Payena
- Species: P. kapitensis

Binomial name
- Payena kapitensis J.T.Pereira

Species of tree

Payena kapitensis is a tree in the family Sapotaceae. It is named for Kapit in Malaysia's Sarawak state.

== Description ==
Payena kapitensis grows up to 35 metres (110 ft) tall with a trunk diameter of up to 45 cm (20 in). The bark is dark brown. The inflorescences bear up to four flowers.

== Distribution and habitat ==
Payena kapitensis is endemic to Borneo, where it is known only from Sarawak. Its habitat is mixed dipterocarp forests.

== Conservation ==
Payena kapitensis has been assessed as critically endangered on the IUCN Red List. It is at risk from logging and conversion of land for palm oil plantations. The species is not known to be present in any protected areas.
