= Payena microphylla =

Conservation status
- Least Concern (IUCN 3.1)

Scientific classification
- Kingdom: Plantae
- Clade: Embryophytes
- Clade: Tracheophytes
- Clade: Angiosperms
- Clade: Eudicots
- Clade: Asterids
- Order: Ericales
- Family: Sapotaceae
- Genus: Payena
- Species: P. microphylla

Binomial name
- Payena microphylla (de Vriese) Burck

Synonyms
- Isonandra microphylla de Vriese; Payena beccarii Pierre; Payena parvifolia Engl.

Species of tree

Payena microphylla is a tree in the family Sapotaceae. The specific epithet microphylla means 'small-leaved'.

== Description ==
Payena microphylla grows up to 45 metres (150 ft) tall with a trunk diameter of up to 160 cm (60 in). The bark is black to reddish brown. The inflorescences bear up to 15 flowers. The fruits are ovoid to ellipsoid and measure up to 4 cm (1.6 in) long.

== Distribution and habitat ==
Payena microphylla is endemic to Borneo. Its habitat is lowland mixed dipterocarp to montane forest, to 2,000 m (6,600 ft) elevation.

== Conservation ==
Payena microphylla has been assessed as least concern on the IUCN Red List. However, its Borneo habitat is generally at risk from logging and conversion of land for palm oil plantations. The species is present in Kinabalu Park and Gunung Mulu National Park, which affords a level of protection in those areas.
