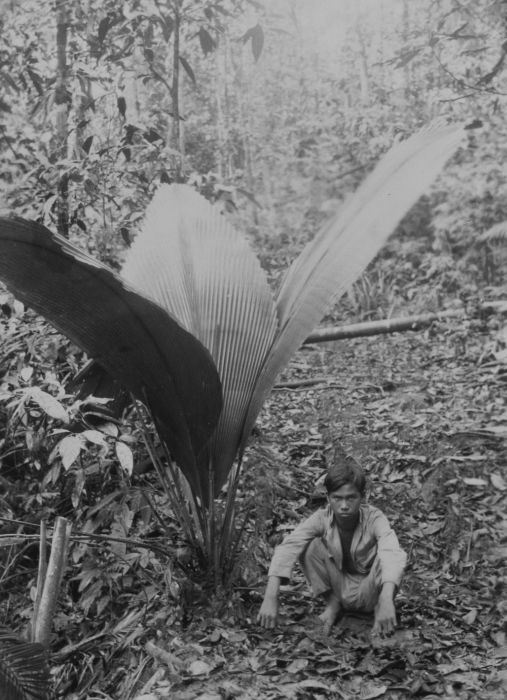
- Johannesteijsmannia altifrons in Sumatra (Photo:Tropenmuseum, Amsterdam)

Scientific classification
- Kingdom: Plantae
- Clade: Tracheophytes
- Clade: Angiosperms
- Clade: Monocots
- Clade: Commelinids
- Order: Arecales
- Family: Arecaceae
- Subfamily: Coryphoideae
- Tribe: Trachycarpeae
- Genus: Johannesteijsmannia; H.E.Moore

Synonyms
- Teysmannia Rchb.f. & Zoll. 1858, illegitimate name not Miq. 1857

= Johannesteijsmannia =

Genus of palms

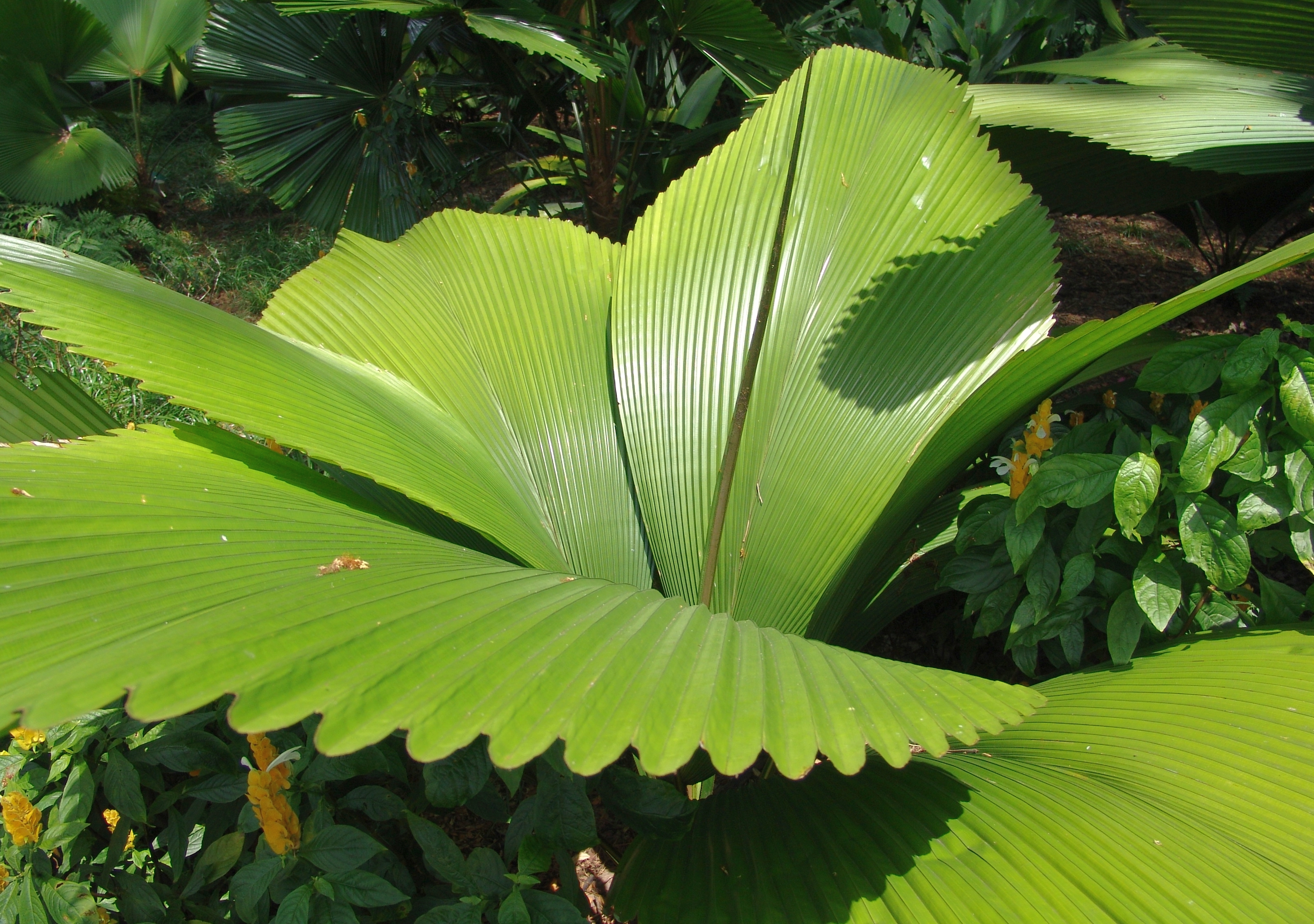
Johannesteijsmannia altifrons

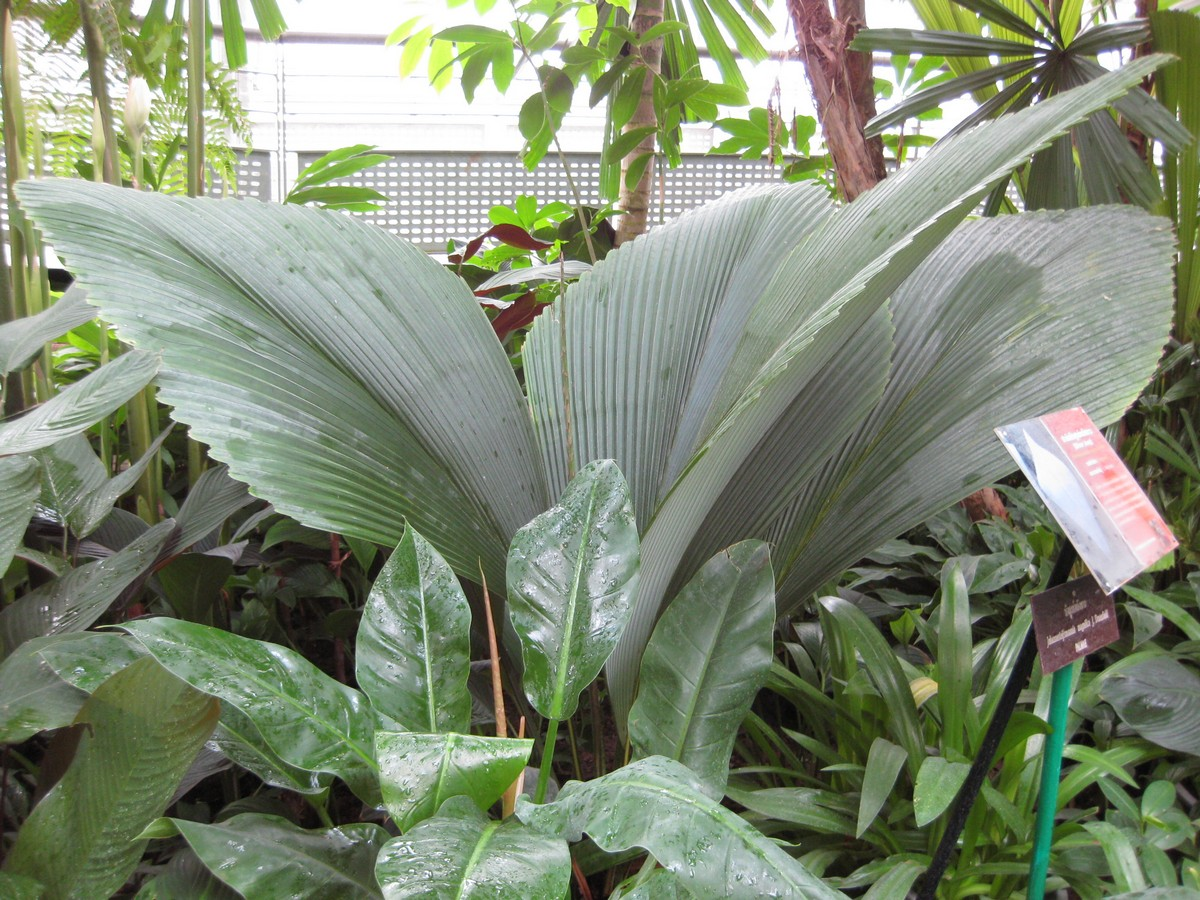
Johannesteijsmannia magnifica

Johannesteijsmannia is a genus of flowering plants in the palm family, Arecaceae. The genus has four species that are native to the tropical rainforests of Borneo, the Malay Peninsula, northern Sumatra, and Thailand. They are fan palms, usually growing without a trunk. The genus was named in honor of Johannes Elias Teijsmann, a Dutch botanist who was director of the Bogor Botanical Gardens from 1830 to 1869.

== Species ==
Species include:

Image	Scientific name	Distribution
	Johannesteijsmannia altifrons (Rchb.f. & Zoll.) H.E.Moore	southern Thailand, Peninsular Malaysia, Borneo, Sumatra
	Johannesteijsmannia lanceolata J.Dransf.	Malaysia: Selangor
	Johannesteijsmannia magnifica J.Dransf.	Malaysia: Selangor
	Johannesteijsmannia perakensis J.Dransf.	Malaysia: Perak, Kedah
