= Payena maingayi =

Conservation status
- Least Concern (IUCN 2.3)

Scientific classification
- Kingdom: Plantae
- Clade: Tracheophytes
- Clade: Angiosperms
- Clade: Eudicots
- Clade: Asterids
- Order: Ericales
- Family: Sapotaceae
- Genus: Payena
- Species: P. maingayi

Binomial name
- Payena maingayi C.B.Clarke in J.D.Hooker

Species of flowering plant

Payena maingayi is a species of plant in the family Sapotaceae. It is found in Malaysia and Singapore.
