= Payena grandistipula =

Conservation status
- Vulnerable (IUCN 3.1)

Scientific classification
- Kingdom: Plantae
- Clade: Embryophytes
- Clade: Tracheophytes
- Clade: Angiosperms
- Clade: Eudicots
- Clade: Asterids
- Order: Ericales
- Family: Sapotaceae
- Genus: Payena
- Species: P. grandistipula

Binomial name
- Payena grandistipula J.T.Pereira

Species of tree

Payena grandistipula is a tree in the family Sapotaceae. The specific epithet grandistipula means 'large stipules'.

== Description ==
Payena grandistipula grows up to 20 metres (70 ft) tall with a trunk diameter of up to 30 cm (12 in). The fruits are ovoid, up to 4 cm (1.6 in) long.

== Distribution and habitat ==
Payena grandistipula is endemic to Borneo. Its habitat is riparian forests.

== Conservation ==
Payena grandistipula has been assessed as vulnerable on the IUCN Red List. It is threatened by conversion of land for palm oil plantations.
