= Payena kinabaluensis =

Conservation status
- Endangered (IUCN 3.1)

Scientific classification
- Kingdom: Plantae
- Clade: Embryophytes
- Clade: Tracheophytes
- Clade: Angiosperms
- Clade: Eudicots
- Clade: Asterids
- Order: Ericales
- Family: Sapotaceae
- Genus: Payena
- Species: P. kinabaluensis

Binomial name
- Payena kinabaluensis J.T.Pereira

Species of tree

Payena kinabaluensis is a tree in the family Sapotaceae. It is endemic to Borneo and known only from Malaysia's Sabah state.

It grows up to 20 metres (70 ft) tall. Inflorescences bear up to seven flowers. The fruits are ovoid, up to 3 cm (1 in) long. The tree is named for Mount Kinabalu in Sabah.

It is known from mountain slopes west of Mount Kinabalu and in Sugud Recreational Forest. Its habitat is mixed dipterocarp forest at about 900 metres (3,000 ft) elevation.
