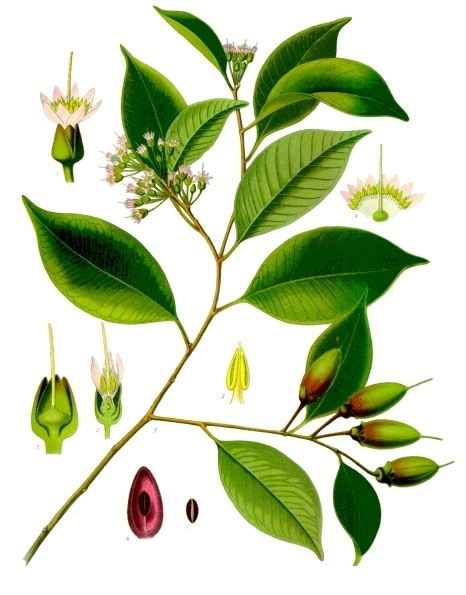
- Payena leerii

Scientific classification
- Kingdom: Plantae
- Clade: Embryophytes
- Clade: Tracheophytes
- Clade: Angiosperms
- Clade: Eudicots
- Clade: Asterids
- Order: Ericales
- Family: Sapotaceae
- Subfamily: Sapotoideae
- Genus: Payena; A.DC.

Synonyms
- Ceratophorus Hassk. 1855 illegitimate homonym not Sond. 1850 (Euphorbiaceae) nor Miq. 1859 (Sapotaceae); Keratephorus Hassk.; Hapaloceras Hassk.

= Payena =

Genus of trees

Payena is a genus of plants in the family Sapotaceae, described as a genus in 1844. It is native to Southeast Asia.

As of March 2024, Plants of the World Online recognised the following species:

1. Payena acuminata (Blume) Pierre – Thailand, Peninsular Malaysia, Borneo, Java, Sumatra
2. Payena annamensis Lecomte – Vietnam
3. Payena asiatica Chantar. – Thailand, Peninsular Malaysia, Sumatra
4. Payena dantung H.J.Lam – Sumatra
5. Payena dasyphylla (Miq.) Pierre – Sumatra, Peninsular Malaysia
6. Payena endertii H.J.Lam – Sumatra
7. Payena ferruginea J.T.Pereira – Borneo
8. Payena gigas A.Bruggen – Borneo
9. Payena grandistipula J.T.Pereira – Borneo
10. Payena kapitensis J.T.Pereira – Borneo
11. Payena khoonmengiana J.T.Pereira – Borneo
12. Payena kinabaluensis J.T.Pereira – Borneo
13. Payena lamii A.Bruggen – Borneo
14. Payena leerii (Teijsm. & Binn.) Kurz. – Myanmar, Peninsular Malaysia, Borneo, Sumatra, Philippines
15. Payena longipedicellata Brace ex King & Gamble – Peninsular Malaysia, Borneo
16. Payena lucida A.DC. – Andaman Islands, Bangladesh, Myanmar, Thailand, Peninsular Malaysia, Borneo, Sumatra
17. Payena maingayi C.B.Clarke – Thailand, Peninsular Malaysia
18. Payena microphylla (de Vriese) Burck – Borneo
19. Payena obscura Burck – Peninsular Malaysia, Borneo, Sumatra
20. Payena pseudoterminalis H.J.Lam – Sumatra
