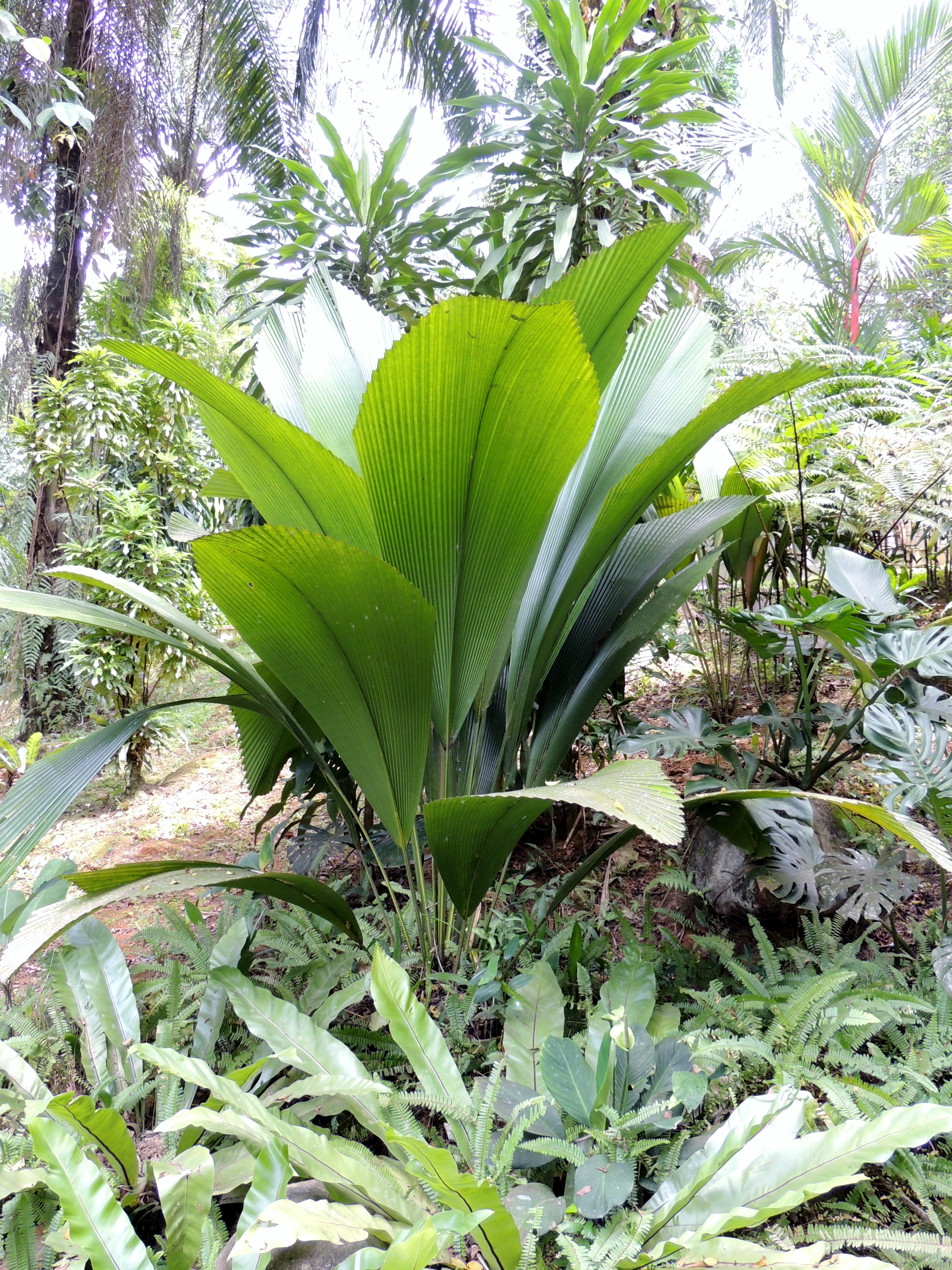

Scientific classification
- Kingdom: Plantae
- Clade: Tracheophytes
- Clade: Angiosperms
- Clade: Monocots
- Clade: Commelinids
- Order: Arecales
- Family: Arecaceae
- Genus: Johannesteijsmannia
- Species: J. altifrons

Binomial name
- Johannesteijsmannia altifrons (Rchb.f. & Zoll.) H.E.Moore

Synonyms
- Teysmannia altifrons Rchb.f. & Zoll.

= Johannesteijsmannia altifrons =

Species of palm

Johannesteijsmannia altifrons is a species of flowering plant in the palm family. It is native to southern Thailand, Peninsular Malaysia, Borneo, and Sumatra. Flowers of this species smell of sour milk.

== Description ==
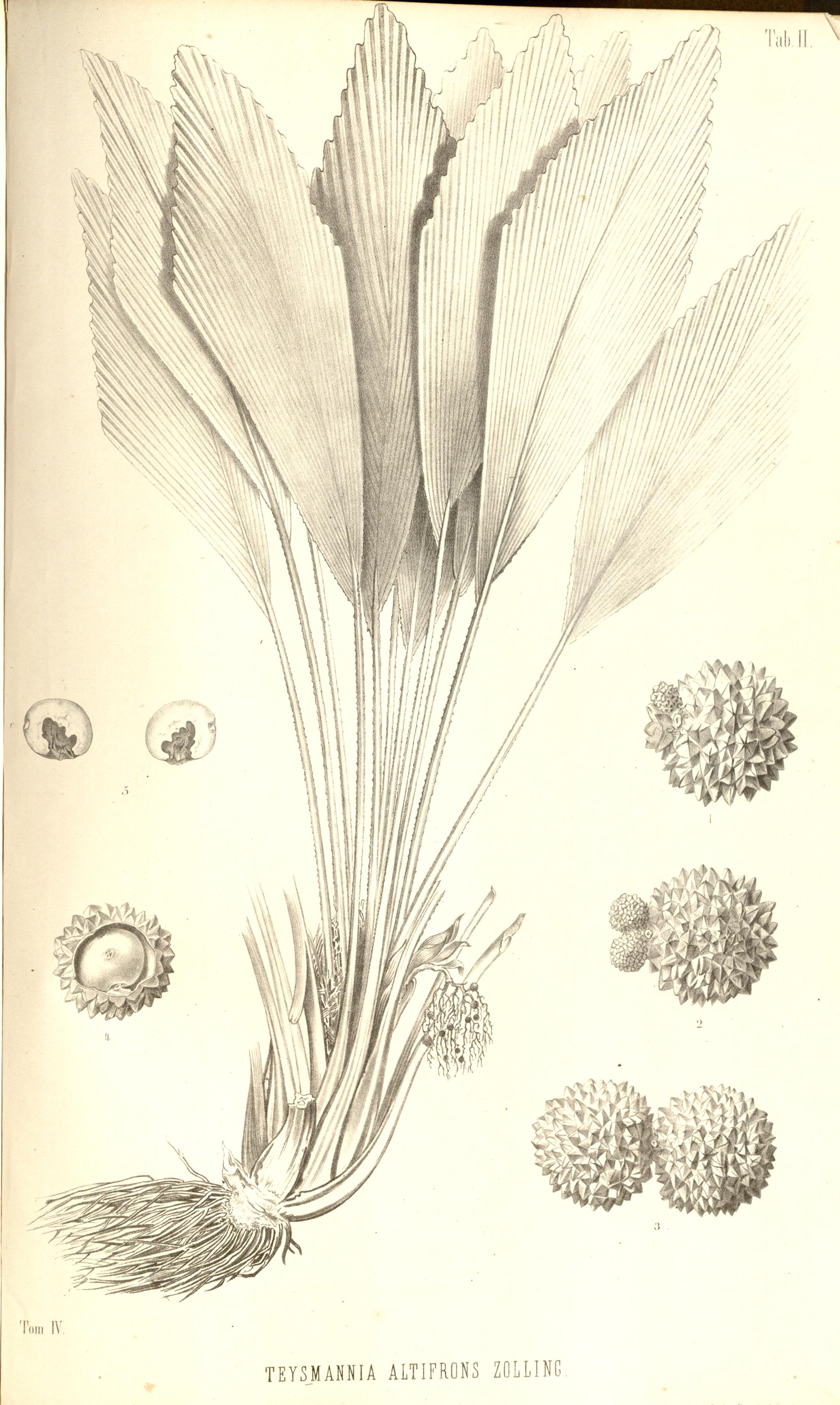
Illustration in Annales Musei Botanici Lugduno-Batavi.

This is a medium-sized, stemless palm with a subterranean, creeping base that can reach up to 15 cm in diameter. It forms a dense crown of 20–30 large, upright leaves that can grow up to 3.5 m in length and 1.8 m in width. The leaves have a pleated structure with up to 20 or more folds on each side, a leathery texture, and serrated edges. The petioles, reaching up to 2.5 m long, are lined with minute spines and transition into a broad leaf blade that is smooth underneath but covered in brown scales near the central rib. The inflorescence starts upright before arching downward, branching into multiple levels. The flowering stalk is 30–50 cm long, bearing 20–100 smaller branches covered in fine white fuzz. The flowers are small, cream-colored, and pointed when in bud, measuring 4–5 mm in length. The rounded fruit reaches 4–5 cm in diameter and is covered in 60–80 corky protrusions, giving it a distinct textured appearance.
