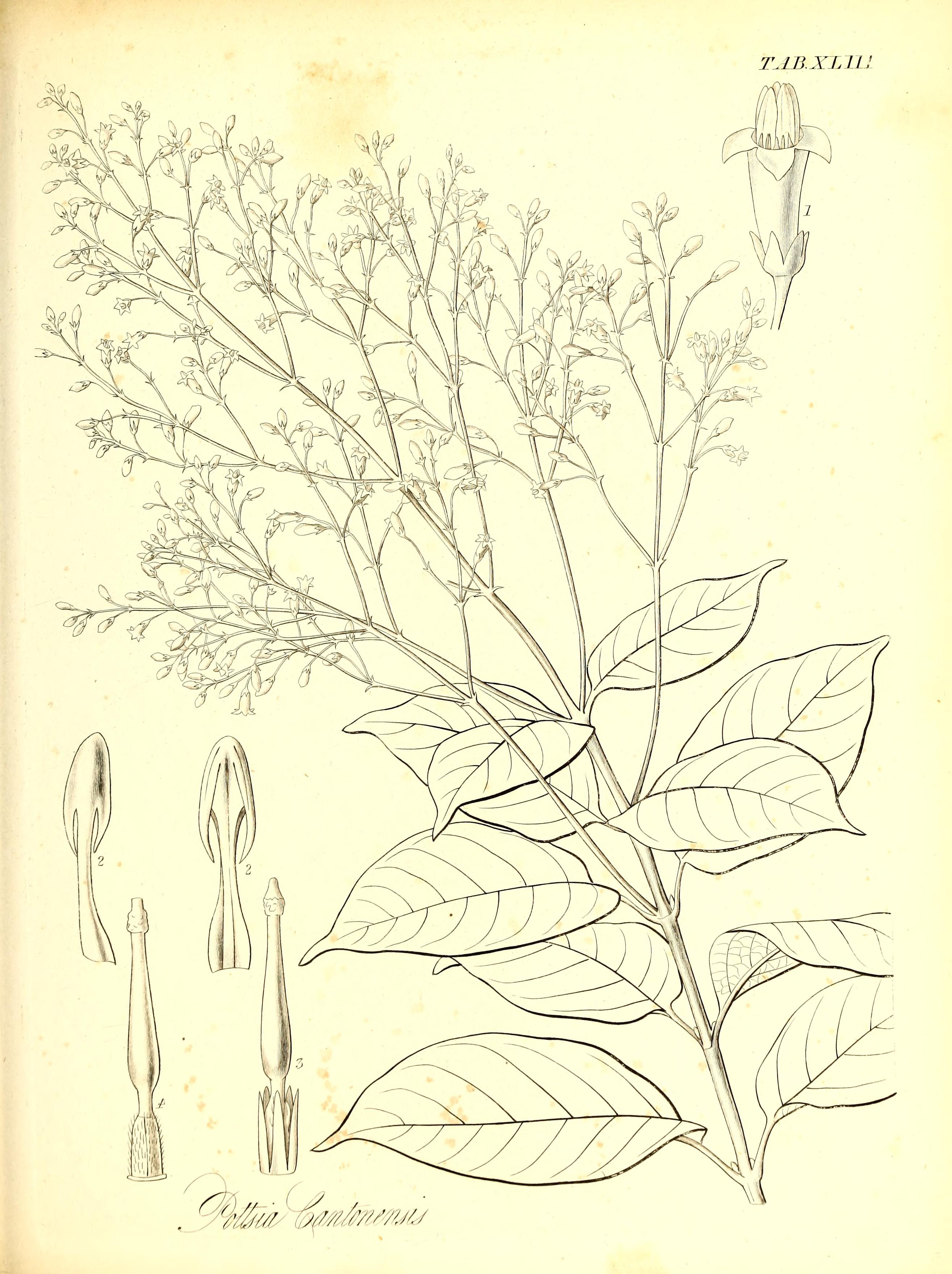
- Pottsia laxiflora

Scientific classification
- Kingdom: Plantae
- Clade: Tracheophytes
- Clade: Angiosperms
- Clade: Eudicots
- Clade: Asterids
- Order: Gentianales
- Family: Apocynaceae
- Subfamily: Apocynoideae
- Tribe: Apocyneae
- Genus: Pottsia; Hook. & Arn.

Synonyms
- Euthodon Griff.; Teysmannia Miq. 1857 not Rchb. & Zoll. 1858; Parapottsia Miq.

= Pottsia =

Genus of plants

Pottsia is a genus of plants in the family Apocynaceae, first described as a genus in 1837. It is native to East and Southeast Asia.

Species

- Pottsia densiflora D.J.Middleton - Laos, Thailand
- Pottsia grandiflora Markgr. - Fujian, Guangdong, Guangxi, Hunan, Yunnan, Zhejiang
- Pottsia laxiflora (Blume) Kuntze - Fujian, Guangdong, Guangxi, Guizhou, Hainan, Hunan, Yunnan, Zhejiang, Assam, Bangladesh, Indochina, W Malaysia, Sumatra, Java, Bali
