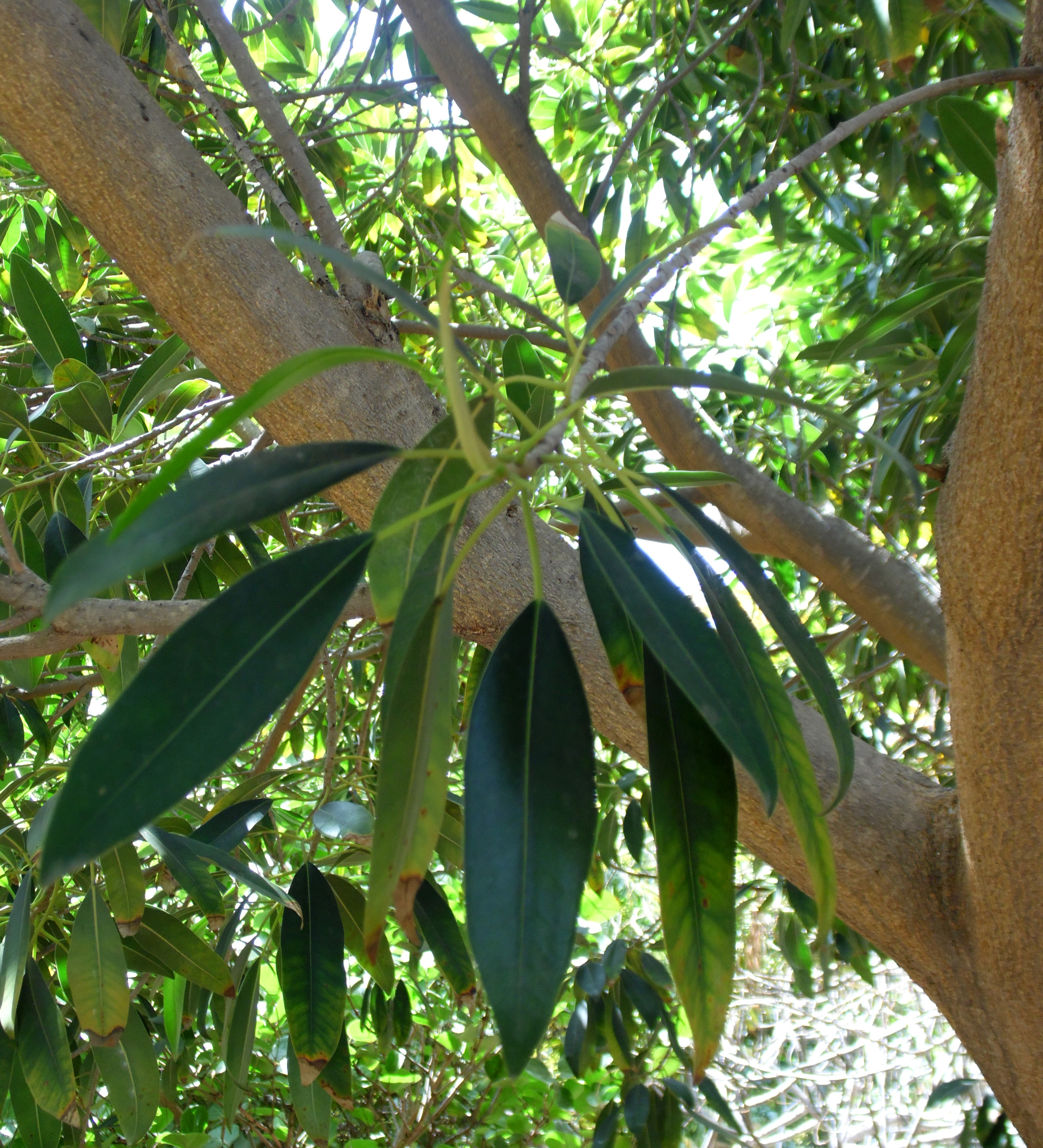
- Stem and leaves
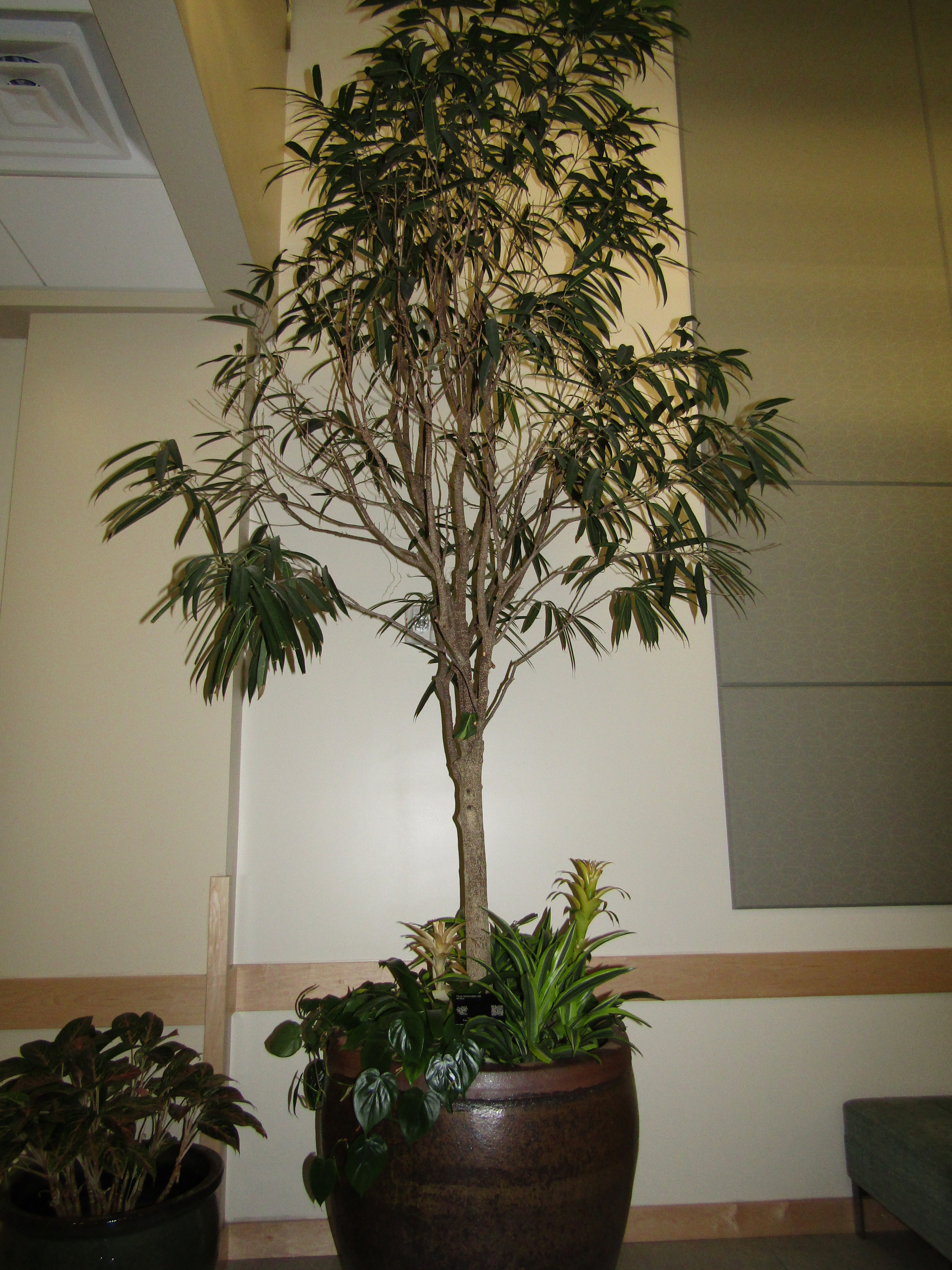
- 'Alii' cultivar as a leggy houseplant

Conservation status
- Least Concern (IUCN 3.1)

Scientific classification
- Kingdom: Plantae
- Clade: Tracheophytes
- Clade: Angiosperms
- Clade: Eudicots
- Clade: Rosids
- Order: Rosales
- Family: Moraceae
- Genus: Ficus
- Species: F. binnendykii

Binomial name
- Ficus binnendykii (Miq.) Miq.

Synonyms
- Ficus ngii Kochummen; Ficus peracuta (Miq.) Miq.; Urostigma binnendykii Miq.; Urostigma peracutum Miq.

= Ficus binnendykii =

Species of plant

Ficus binnendykii (many authorities use the orthographical variant Ficus binnendijkii), the narrow-leaf fig, is a widespread species of flowering plant in the family Moraceae. It is native to southern Thailand, Peninsular Malaysia, Singapore, Sumatra, Java, and Borneo. An evergreen strangler fig reaching 30 m (100 ft), it is typically found in wet tropical forests at elevations up to 1,000 m (3,300 ft). Found in open, secondary, and undisturbed forests, it has been assessed as Least Concern. It is kept as an ornamental and a houseplant, with the cultivars 'Alii' and 'Amstel King' available from commercial suppliers.

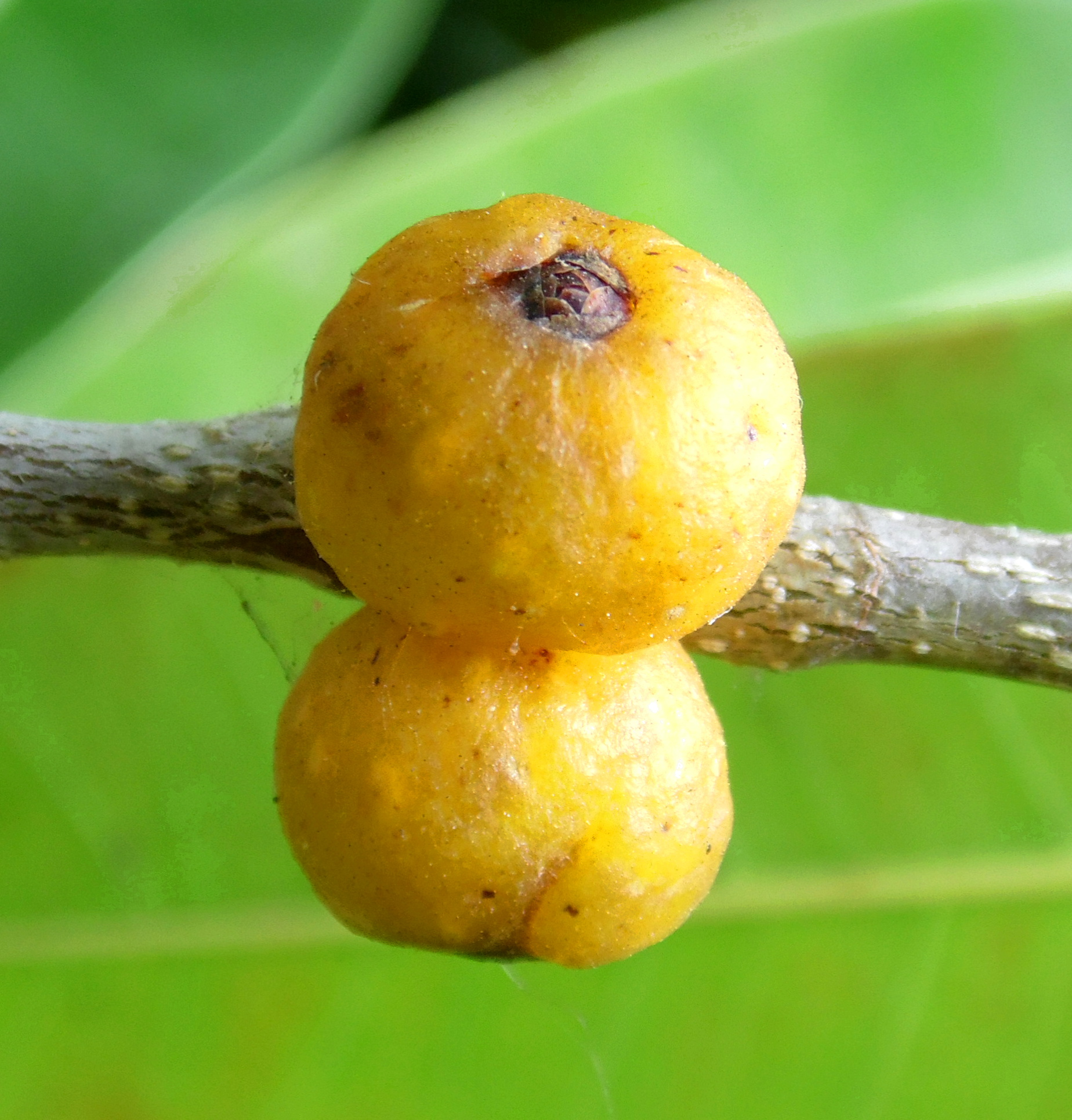
Fruit

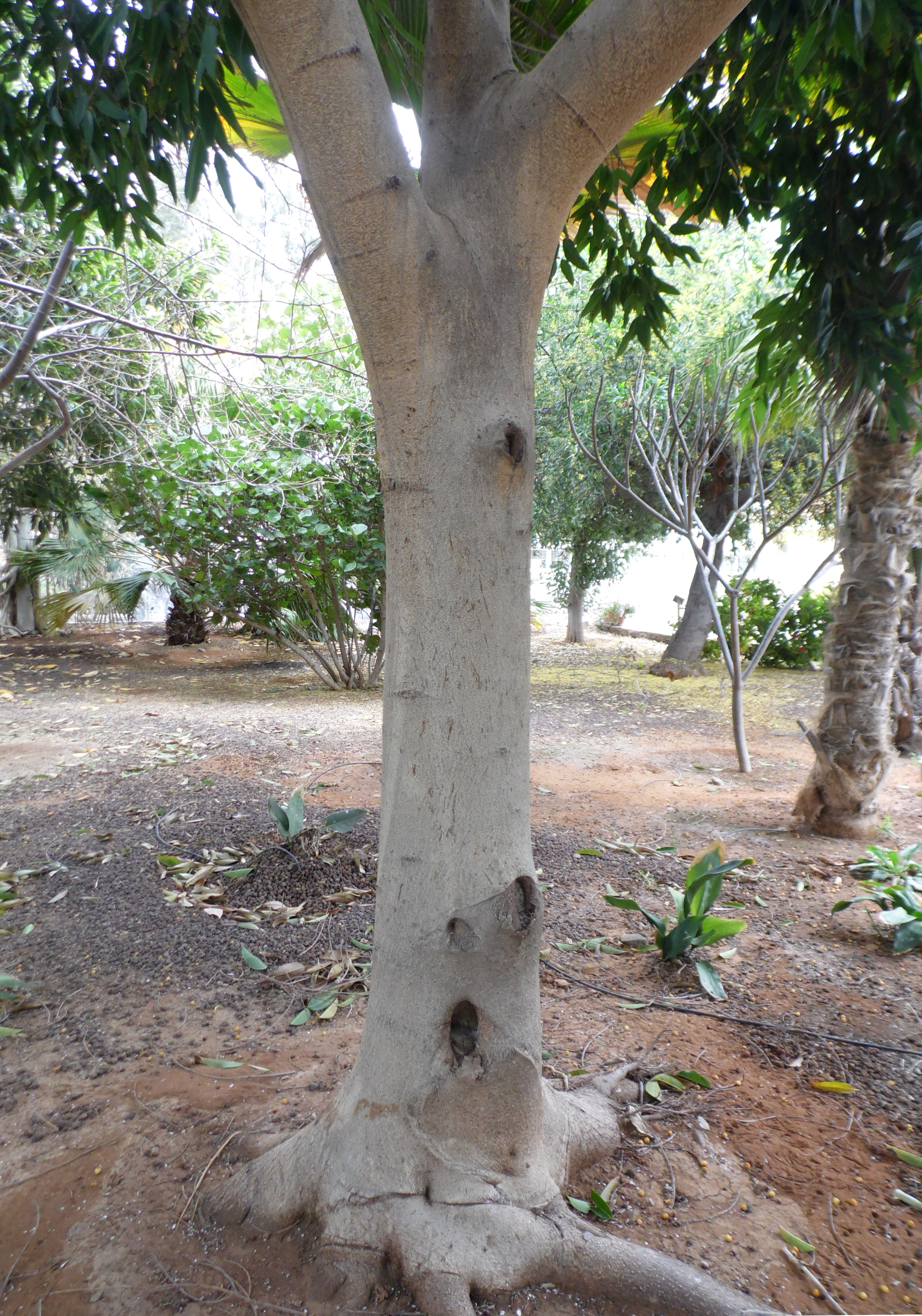
Standing independently

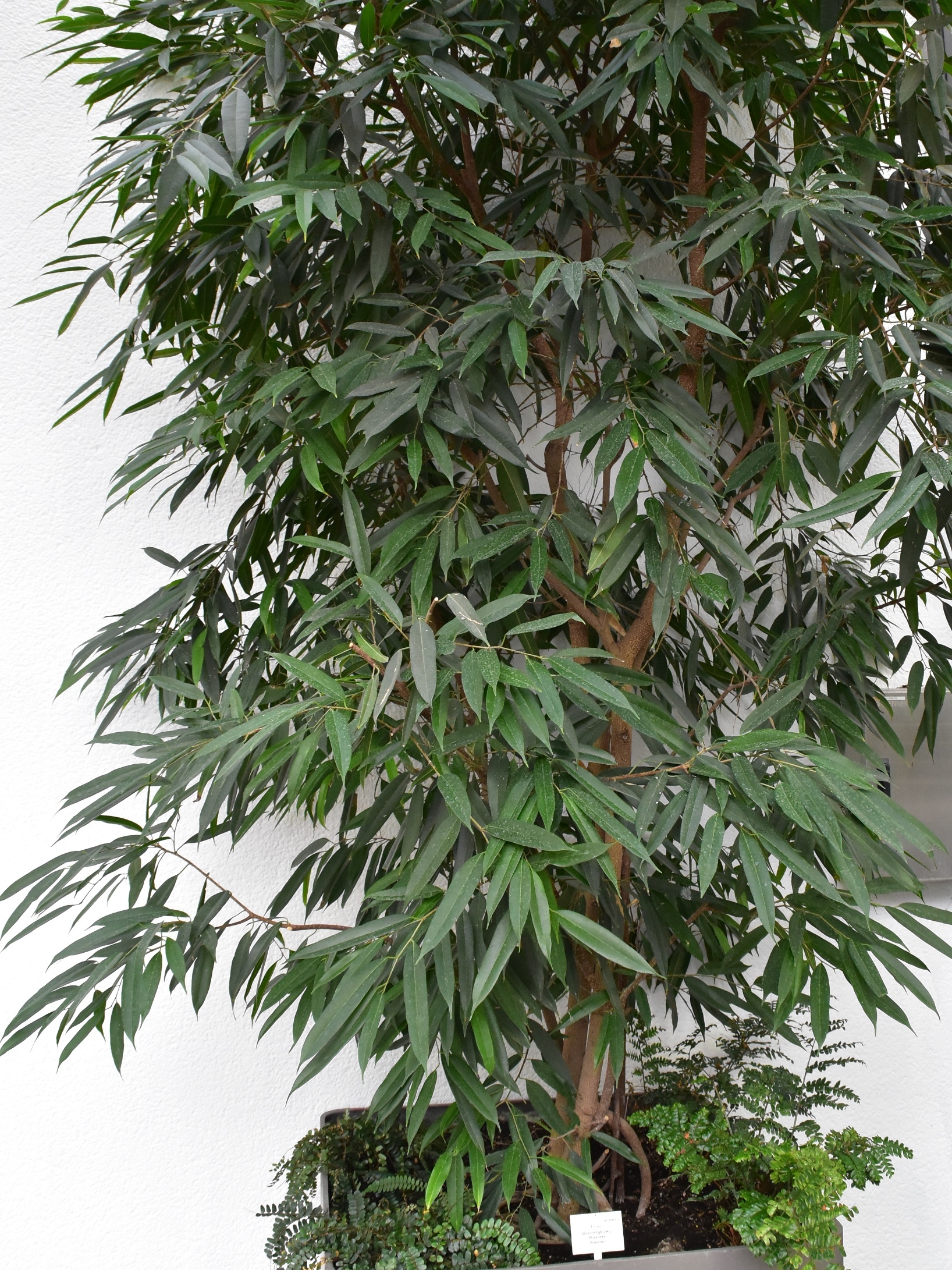
A well-behaved specimen at the Palmengarten

== Subtaxa ==
The following varieties are accepted:

- Ficus binnendykii var. binnendykii – entire range
- Ficus binnendykii var. latifolia Corner – Borneo
