= Simon Binnendijk =

Dutch botanist (1821–1883)

Simon Binnendijk (26 March 1821, Leiden – 28 October 1883, Buitenzorg) was a Dutch gardener and botanist.

He received botanical training under Willem Hendrik de Vriese (1806–1862) in Leiden. From 1850 to 1869 he was assistant curator at the Botanical Garden of Buitenzorg in the Dutch East Indies, afterwards serving as curator of the gardens. During his tenure in the East Indies, he participated on a botanical expedition to the Moluccas.

With Johannes Elias Teijsmann (1808–1882), he was co-author of "Plantae novae in Horto Bogoriensi cultae" (1862) and "Catalogus plantarum quae in Horto botanico bogoriensi coluntur" (1866). With Teijsmann, he described the genera Capellenia, Eusideroxylon and Gonystylus, as well as numerous botanical species. The specific epithet of binnendijkii commemorates his name, two examples being Garcinia binnendijkii and Ficus binnendijkii.
