= Johannes Elias Teijsmann =

Dutch botanist (1808–1882)

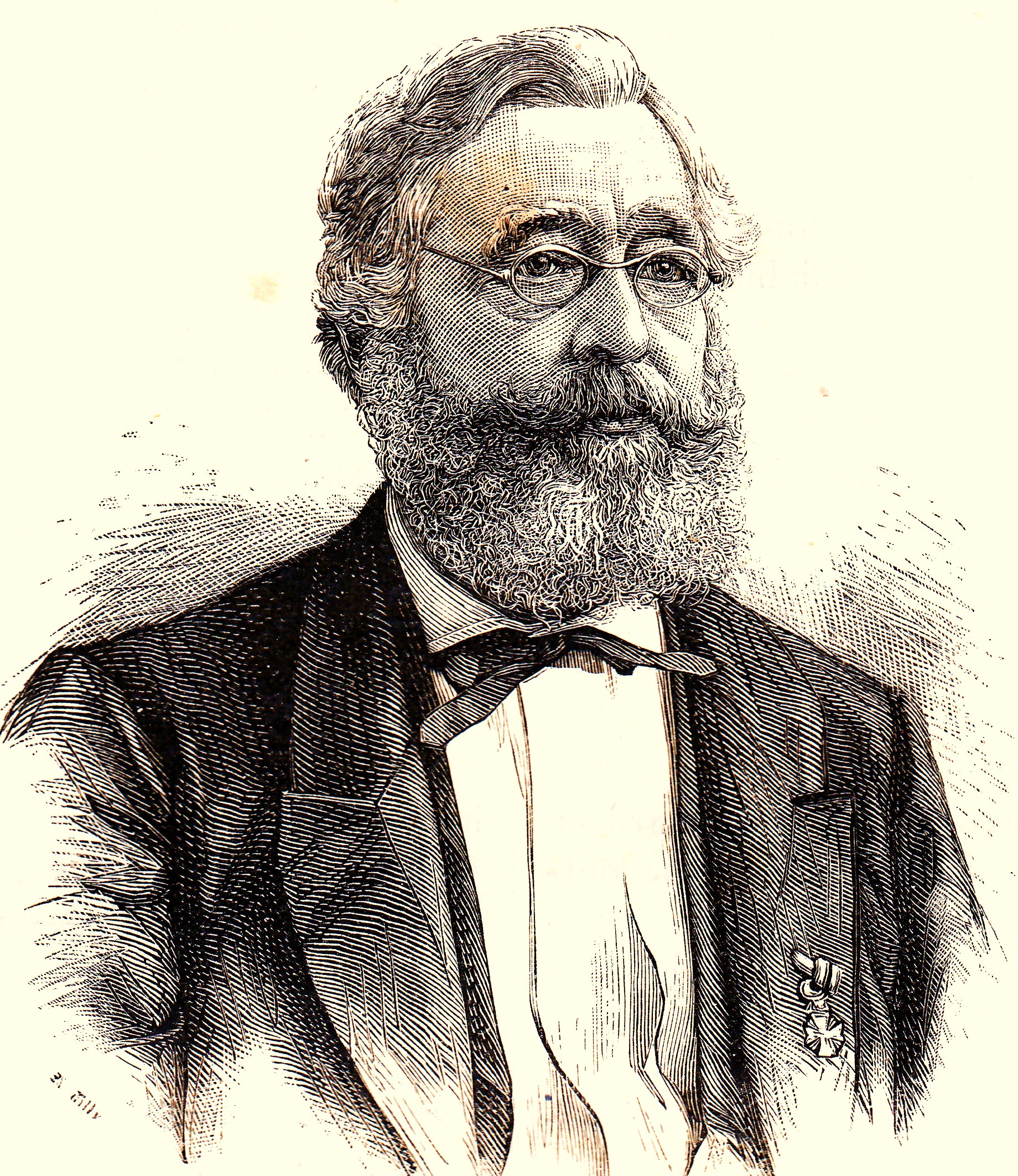
Johannes Elias Teijsmann

Johannes Elias Teijsmann (1 June 1808 – 22 June 1882) was a biologist, botanist and plant collector. He was born in Arnhem, The Netherlands. His surname is sometimes spelled Teysmann, although he spelled it Teijsmann.

Teijsmann travelled to Java in 1830 as gardener of Governor General Johannes van den Bosch. He was appointed the director - hortulanus - of the Lands Plantentuin in Buitenzorg (now Bogor) the following year, a post he held until 1869. He took part in important botanical expeditions throughout maritime Southeast Asia. Teijsmann was also part of a Dutch fact-finding mission to Siam (presently Thailand).

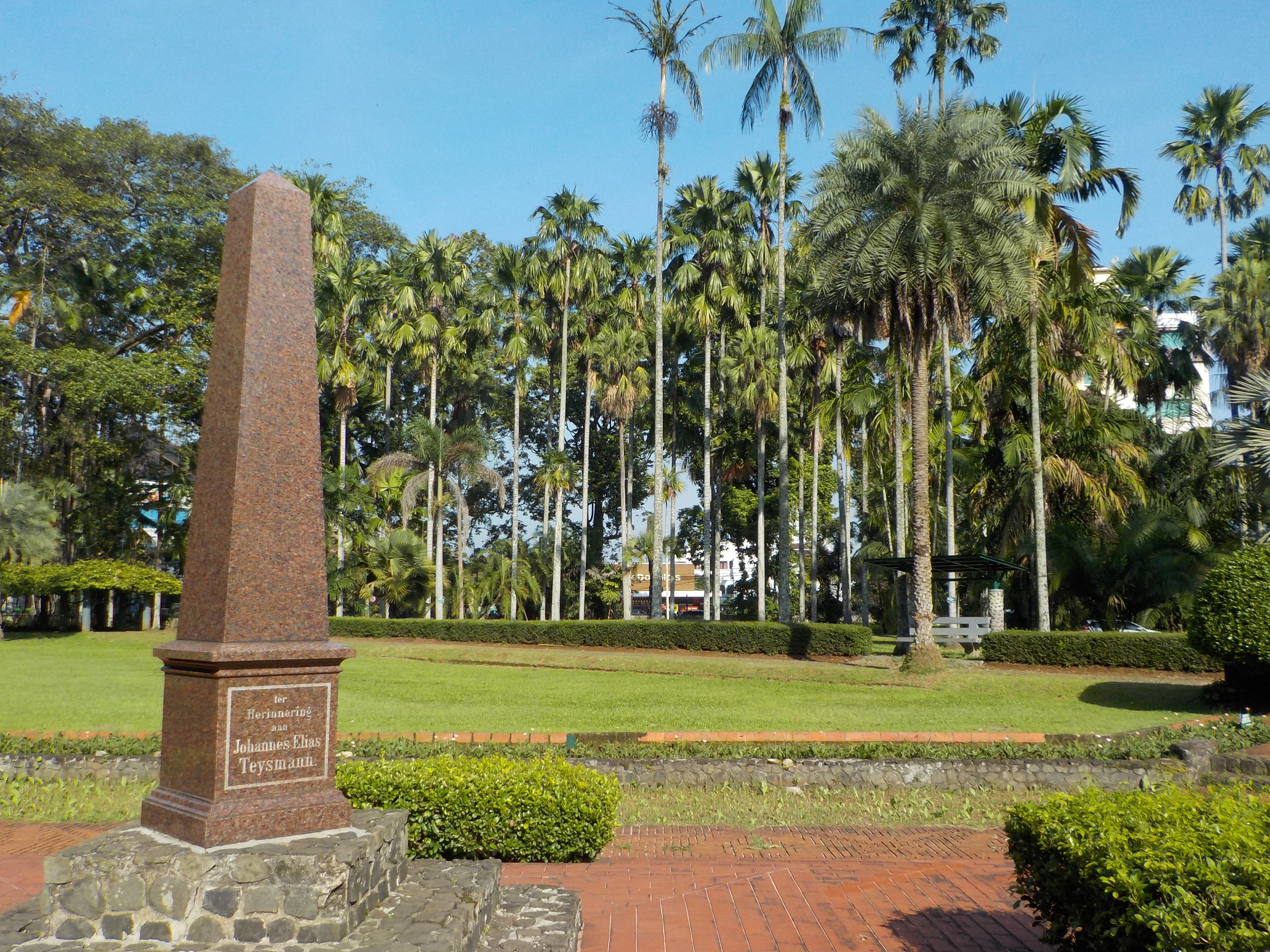
A monument to honor Johannes Elias Teysmann at Bogor Botanical Garden Indonesia

He is notable for the introduction of cassava plants (from the island of Bantam, near Sumatra) as a food source to alleviate famines in the then Dutch East Indies. Together with his collaborator Justus Carl Hasskarl, he introduced the cultivation of Cinchona trees (from Peru) for the production of quinine to treat malaria (ca. 1852/1854). There was a bitter conflict between Teijsmann and two fellow botanists, Johann Eliza de Vrij (1813–1898) and Franz Wilhelm Junghuhn on the effectiveness of various Cinchona species in the treatment of malaria. Nevertheless, successful experimentation on the plant was carried out in the new Cibodas Gardens which eventually made Java the largest producer of kina (Cinchona bark). His interest in palm trees led Teijsmann to introduce the oil palm (from West Africa) to Indonesia, which remains a significant export earner for the country’s economy. He also introduced vanilla artificial pollination techniques to Java, making the crop much more productive and cheaper. Due to Teijsmann's hard put effort the number of plant collections in the garden had grown from 900 in 1822 to 10,000 in 1863.

Teijsmann also played a large role in the separation of the Botanic Gardens from the adjacent Buitenzorg Palace on 30 May 1868, a move that gave the public and scientists more access to the Gardens. He resigned honorably from the directorship of the garden in 1869 and was awarded the title "Inspector Honorair Cultures". Using this title he visited many of the provincial residences across the Dutch East Indies and continued to gather more plants for the Botanical Gardens.

Teijsmann died in 1882 and for his service to Lands Plantentuin, a monument to honor him was erected by the Gardens' director Dr. Melchior Treub, and his friends in 1884. The monument is located in what is now called the Medan Teijsmann in the Botanic Garden (now known as Kebun Raya Bogor).

The genus Teysmannia (since the work of Harold Emery Moore more correctly called Johannesteijsmannia) is named in his honour, together with several plant species. He was also commemorated in the periodical Teysmannia, which was published between 1890 and 1922. In 1925, it was incorporated into De Indische Culturen-Teysmannia.
