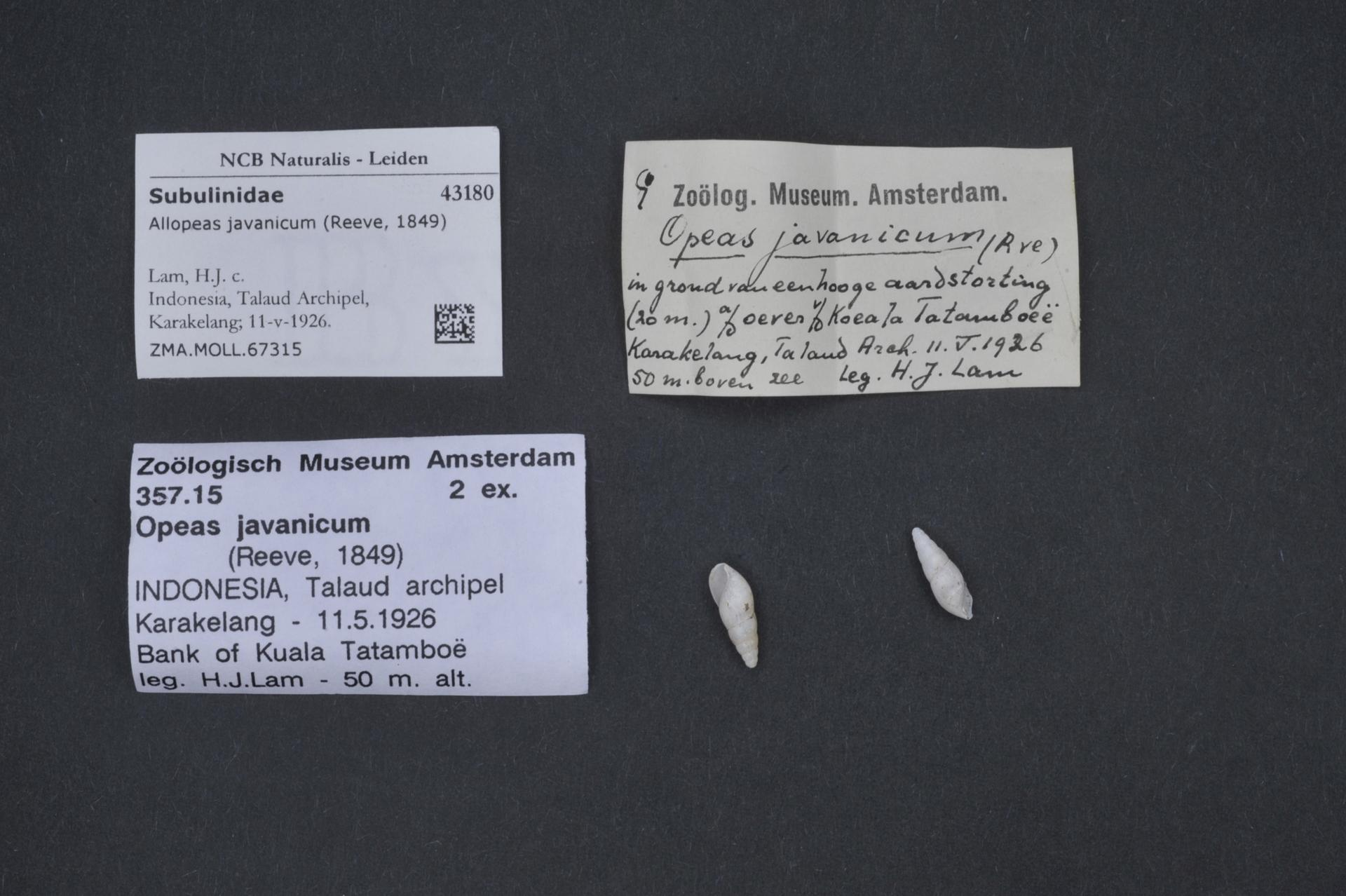
- Shell of Paropeas achatinaceum (specimen at Naturalis Biodiversity Center)

Conservation status
- Secure (NatureServe)

Scientific classification
- Kingdom: Animalia
- Phylum: Mollusca
- Class: Gastropoda
- Order: Stylommatophora
- Family: Achatinidae
- Genus: Paropeas
- Species: P. achatinaceum

Binomial name
- Paropeas achatinaceum (L. Pfeiffer, 1846)

Synonyms
- Bulimus achatinaceus L. Pfeiffer, 1846; Achatina javanica L. A. Reeve, 1848-1850

= Paropeas achatinaceum =

Species of gastropod

Paropeas achatinaceum is a species of air-breathing land snail, a terrestrial pulmonate gastropod mollusc in the family Achatinidae.

== Taxonomy ==
The subgenus Paropeas within the genus Prosopeas was elevated to generic status in 1994, based on the anatomy of this species.

== Description ==
Paropeas achatinaceum is a small snail with an oblong shell.

The reproductive system of Paropeas achatinaceum was described by Naggs (1994) and by Azuma (1995).

== Distribution ==
Paropeas achatinaceum is native to Southeast Asia It is widely distributed in the Indo-Pacific region.

The type locality is Java.

Distribution include:

- Pratas Island, Taiwan

The non-native distribution of Paropeas achatinaceum includes:

- It became established in the Hawaiian Islands in the early 1900s.

Although it has not been reported from anywhere else in the Neotropics, it was recently (December 2002) intercepted during preclearance of a shipment of Eryngium from Puerto Rico to Georgia, USA. It is possible that the source of the specimen was the Dominican Republic, because much of the Eryngium shipped to the U.S. mainland from Puerto Rico is actually of Dominican origin.

- USA - introduced:
  - It was first detected on a shipment in Florida in 2002.
  - Miami-Dade County, Florida - it has been reported since 2003 in the wild
  - Broward County, Florida - it has been reported since 2003 in the wild

== Ecology ==
Paropeas achatinaceum is a phytophagous (plant eating) snail, which like many other subulinids, feeds on the roots of a wide variety of different plants, including those of the pineapple.
