= Pyrgina umbilicata =

Conservation status
- Data Deficient (IUCN 2.3)

Scientific classification
- Kingdom: Animalia
- Phylum: Mollusca
- Class: Gastropoda
- Order: Stylommatophora
- Superfamily: Achatinoidea
- Family: Achatinidae
- Genus: Pyrgina
- Species: P. umbilicata

Binomial name
- Pyrgina umbilicata Greeff, 1882

Species of gastropod

Pyrgina umbilicata is a species of small, tropical, air-breathing land snail, a terrestrial pulmonate gastropod mollusk in the family Achatinidae.

== Distribution ==
This species is endemic to São Tomé and Príncipe.
