= Pseudoglessula acutissima =

Conservation status
- Data Deficient (IUCN 2.3)

Scientific classification
- Kingdom: Animalia
- Phylum: Mollusca
- Class: Gastropoda
- Order: Stylommatophora
- Superfamily: Achatinoidea
- Family: Achatinidae
- Genus: Pseudoglessula
- Species: P. acutissima

Binomial name
- Pseudoglessula acutissima Verdcourt

Species of gastropod

Pseudoglessula acutissima is a species of small air-breathing land snail, a terrestrial pulmonate gastropod mollusk in the family Achatinidae. This species is endemic to Tanzania.
