= Pseudoglessula =

Scientific classification
- Domain: Eukaryota
- Kingdom: Animalia
- Phylum: Mollusca
- Class: Gastropoda
- Order: Stylommatophora
- Suborder: Achatinina
- Superfamily: Achatinoidea
- Family: Achatinidae
- Subfamily: Subulininae
- Genus: Pseudoglessula; Boettger, 1892

Genus of gastropods

Pseudoglessula is a genus of small air-breathing land snails, terrestrial pulmonate gastropod mollusks in the family Achatinidae.

== Species ==
Species within the genus Pseudoglessula include:

- Pseudoglessula acutissima Verdcourt
- Pseudoglessula conradti von Martens
- Pseudoglessula intermedia Thiele, 1911
