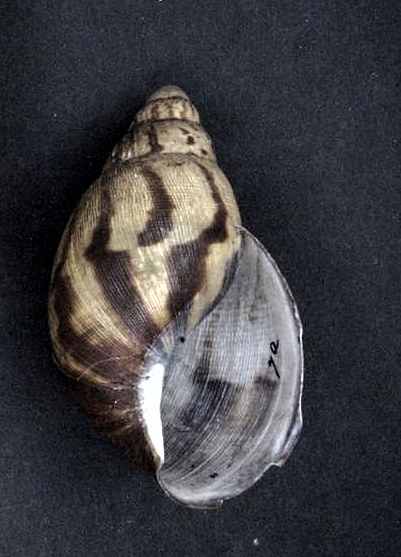
- Museum specimen of Archachatina camerunensis

Scientific classification
- Domain: Eukaryota
- Kingdom: Animalia
- Phylum: Mollusca
- Class: Gastropoda
- Order: Stylommatophora
- Suborder: Achatinina
- Superfamily: Achatinoidea
- Family: Achatinidae
- Genus: Archachatina
- Species: A. camerunensis

Binomial name
- Archachatina camerunensis A. d'Ailly, 1896

= Archachatina camerunensis =

Species of gastropod

Archachatina camerunensis is a species of air-breathing tropical land snail, a terrestrial pulmonate gastropod mollusk in the family Achatinidae.

== Description ==
Its oblong and narrow shell measures 10 cm. Its apex is pale olive green or yellow. The columella is white or gray and white. The ground color of the shell is a pale greenish-yellow hue - pale olive. A characteristic pattern of banding lies parallel to the growth lines. The shell of A. camerunensis has a distinctive surface structure, unlike all other species of Archachatina; the upper half of each whorl has a prominent spiral mesh (a lattice structure), while the bottom half is smooth.

The color of the foot is dark gray or black.

The size of the eggs is 12–16 mm. The typical life expectancy is 5–7 years.

== Distribution ==
This species is endemic to Cameroon, West Africa. It is found in the Centre Province, Yaounde.
