= Thomea newtoni =

Conservation status
- Data Deficient (IUCN 3.1)

Scientific classification
- Kingdom: Animalia
- Phylum: Mollusca
- Class: Gastropoda
- Order: Stylommatophora
- Superfamily: Achatinoidea
- Family: Achatinidae
- Genus: Thomea
- Species: T. newtoni

Binomial name
- Thomea newtoni Girard, 1894

Species of gastropod

Thomea newtoni is a species of air-breathing land snail, a terrestrial gastropod mollusk in the family Achatinidae. This species is endemic to São Tomé and Príncipe.
