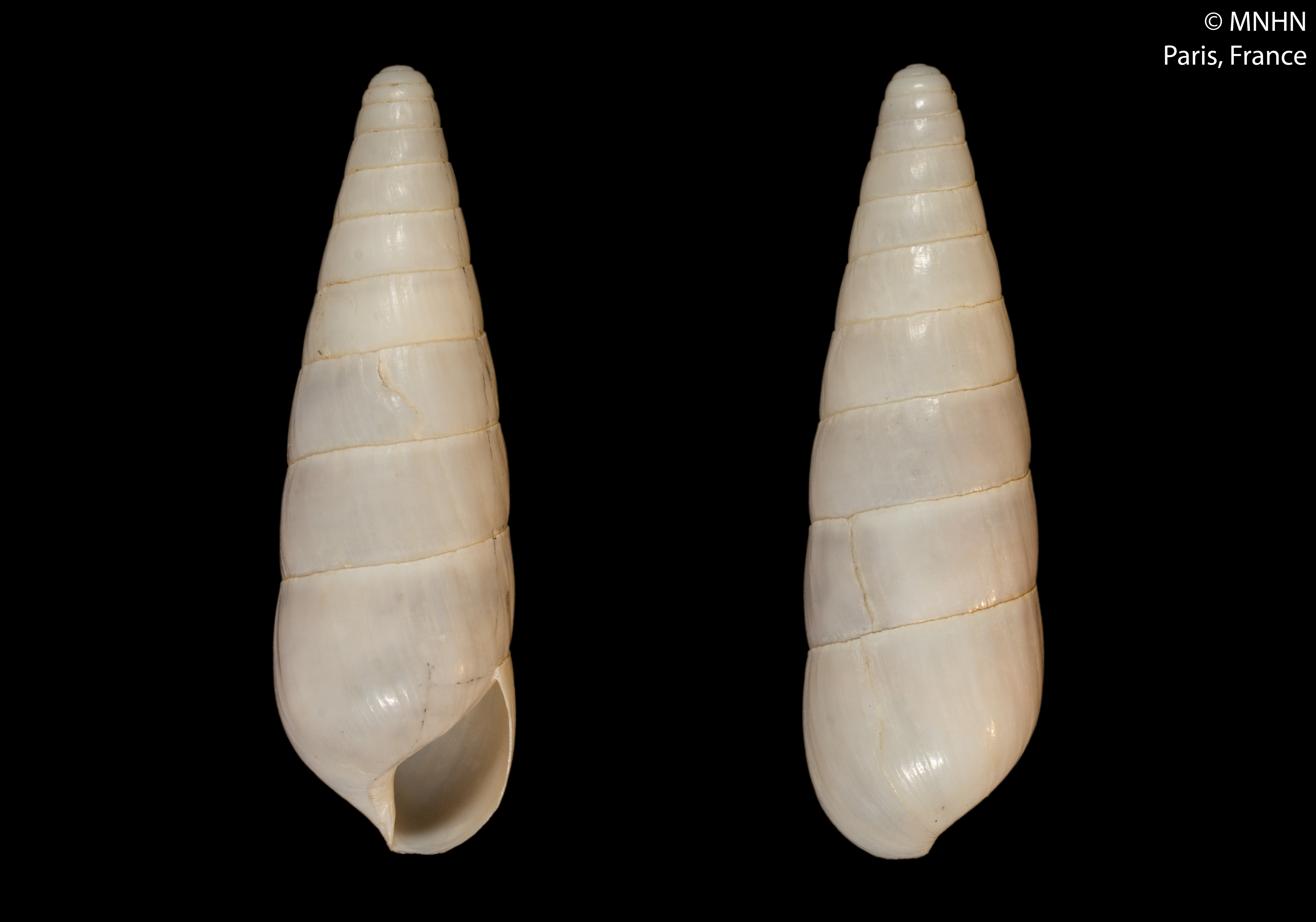
- Shell of Riebeckia sokotorana (holotype at MNHN, Paris)

Scientific classification
- Kingdom: Animalia
- Phylum: Mollusca
- Class: Gastropoda
- Order: Stylommatophora
- Suborder: Achatinina
- Superfamily: Achatinoidea
- Family: Achatinidae
- Genus: Riebeckia; E. von Martens, 1883

Type species
- Achatina sokotorana E. von Martens, 1881

Synonyms
- Stenogyra (Riebeckia) E. von Martens, 1883 ·

= Riebeckia =

Genus of gastropods

Riebeckia is a genus of air-breathing tropical land snails, terrestrial pulmonate gastropod mollusks in the subfamily Coeliaxinae of the family Achatinidae.

== Species ==
- Riebeckia adonensis (Godwin-Austen, 1881)
- Riebeckia decipiens (E. A. Smith, 1897)
- Riebeckia enodis (Godwin-Austen, 1881)
- Riebeckia gollonsirensis (Godwin-Austen, 1881)
- Riebeckia sokotorana (E. von Martens, 1881)

Synonyms

- Riebeckia lavranosi Salvat, 1969: synonym of Riebeckia sokotorana (E. von Martens, 1881) (junior synonym)
- Riebeckia sordida Neubert, 2002: synonym of Balfouria sordida (Neubert, 2002) (original name)
