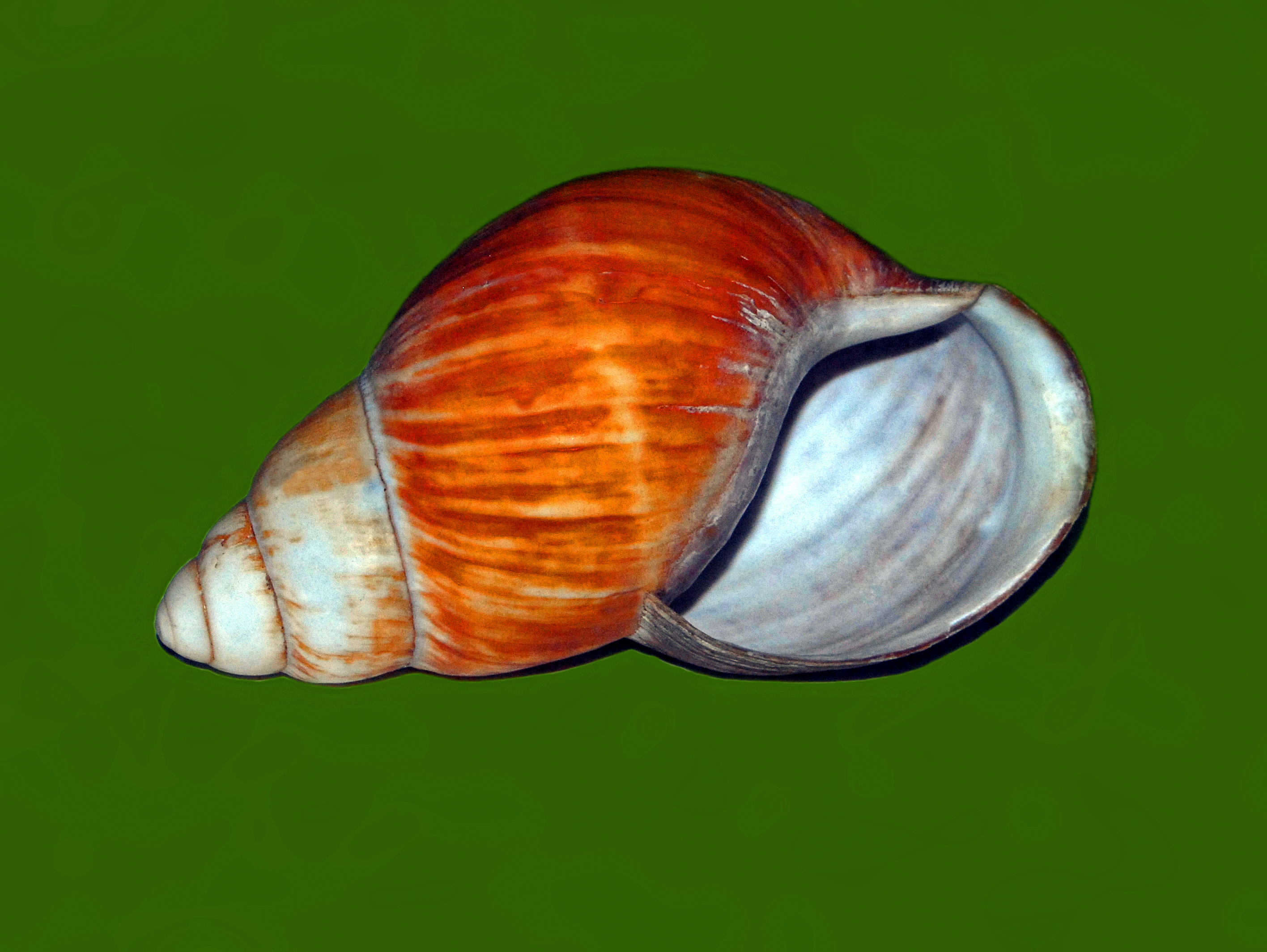
- Shell of Archachatina bicarinata from Príncipe Island

Conservation status
- Endangered (IUCN 3.1)

Scientific classification
- Kingdom: Animalia
- Phylum: Mollusca
- Class: Gastropoda
- Order: Stylommatophora
- Family: Achatinidae
- Genus: Archachatina
- Species: A. bicarinata

Binomial name
- Archachatina bicarinata Bruguière, 1792

Synonyms
- Archachatina sinistrorsa Pfeiffer, 1848

= Archachatina bicarinata =

Species of gastropod

Archachatina bicarinata, the Obô giant snail, or black snail, is a species of air-breathing tropical land snail, a terrestrial pulmonate gastropod mollusk in the family Achatinidae.

== Description ==
The shell of A. bicarinata can reach a length of 11.7–13.5 cm (4.6–5.3 in). This giant shell is always sinistral or reverse-coiled (hence the synonym A. sinistrorsa).

== Distribution ==
This species is endemic to São Tomé and Príncipe, off the west coast of Africa in the Gulf of Guinea.

== Habitat ==
The Obô giant snail lives in the primary rainforest on the mountains. It suffers from habitat loss, the mass collection of the shells and harvesting the snails for food. The species got largely displaced by the smaller West African giant land snail (Archachatina marginata), which was introduced to the island in the 1980 and also brought diseases. A. bicarinata population has declined by more than 75% in the first 20 years of the 21st century. Formerly occurring throughout much of Principe, it is now only found in an area of some 46 km^{2} in the protected forests in the south of the island. Therefore, the species is classified as endangered.
