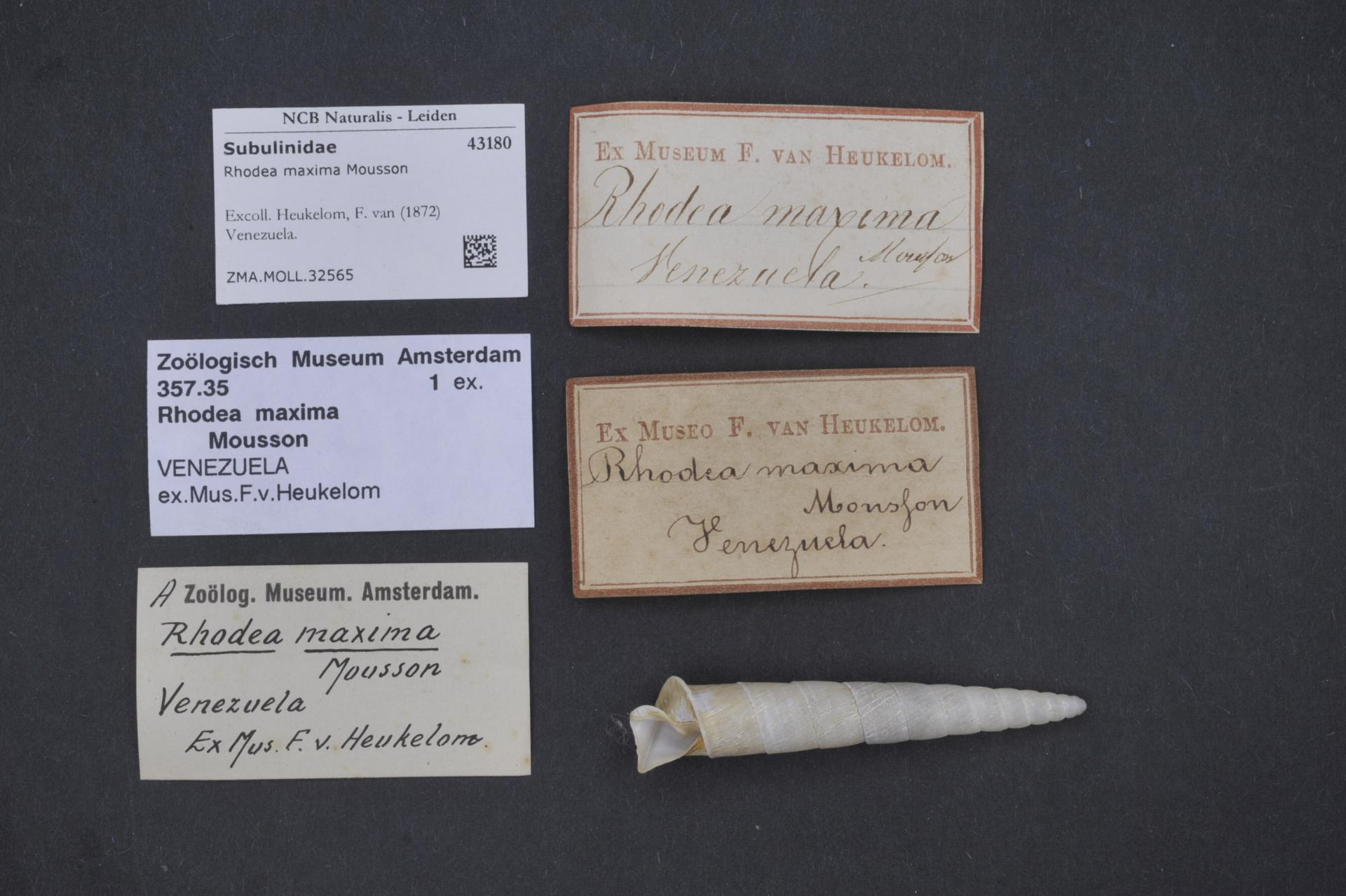
- Rhodea maxima shell

Scientific classification
- Kingdom: Animalia
- Phylum: Mollusca
- Class: Gastropoda
- Order: Stylommatophora
- Superfamily: Achatinoidea
- Family: Achatinidae
- Subfamily: Stenogyrinae
- Genus: Rhodea; H. Adams & A. Adams, 1855

Diversity
- 9 species

= Rhodea =

Genus of gastropods

Rhodea is a genus of land snails, terrestrial gastropod mollusks in the family Achatinidae.

Authors of the genus provided no information about the etymology of this genus and its etymology remains unknown.

== Distribution ==
Distribution of the genus Rhodea include Colombia and Ecuador.

== Species ==
Species within the genus Rhodea include:

- Rhodea aequatoria Da Costa, 1899
- Rhodea barcrofti Pilsbry, 1958
- Rhodea californica (L. Pfeiffer, 1846)
- Rhodea cousini Jousseaume, 1900
- Rhodea crosseana Da Costa, 1899
- Rhodea gigantea Mousson, 1873
- Rhodea mariaalejandrae Grego, Šteffek & Infante, 2007
- Rhodea moussoni Grego, Šteffek & Infante, 2007
- Rhodea wallisiana Dohrn, 1875

== See also ==
A plant genus Rohdea is sometimes misspelled as Rhodea.
