= Paropeas =

Scientific classification
- Kingdom: Animalia
- Phylum: Mollusca
- Class: Gastropoda
- Order: Stylommatophora
- Family: Achatinidae
- Subfamily: Subulininae
- Genus: Paropeas; Pilsbry, 1903

Genus of gastropods

Paropeas is a genus of air-breathing land snails, terrestrial pulmonate gastropod mollusks in the family Achatinidae.

The subgenus Paropeas within the genus Prosopeas was elevated to generic status in 1994, based on the anatomy of Paropeas achatinaceum.

== Species ==
Species within the genus Paropeas include:

- Paropeas achatinaceum
- Paropeas tchehelense
