= Pseudopeas =

Scientific classification
- Domain: Eukaryota
- Kingdom: Animalia
- Phylum: Mollusca
- Class: Gastropoda
- Order: Stylommatophora
- Suborder: Achatinina
- Superfamily: Achatinoidea
- Family: Achatinidae
- Subfamily: Subulininae
- Genus: Pseudopeas; Putzeys, 1899

Genus of land snails

Pseudopeas is a genus of gastropods belonging to the family Achatinidae.

The species of this genus are found in Africa, Central America.

Species:

- Pseudopeas bitzeense Connolly, 1923
- Pseudopeas burnupi (Connolly, 1919)
- Pseudopeas burunganum Connolly, 1923
- Pseudopeas camerunense Connolly, 1923
- Pseudopeas chariesterum Connolly, 1923
- Pseudopeas chlorum Connolly, 1923
- Pseudopeas concinnum Connolly, 1923
- Pseudopeas conspicuum Connolly, 1928
- Pseudopeas crossei (Girard, 1893)
- Pseudopeas curvelliforme Pilsbry, 1919
- Pseudopeas egens (d'Ailly, 1896)
- Pseudopeas elachistum Connolly, 1923
- Pseudopeas elgonense Connolly, 1923
- Pseudopeas feai Germain, 1915
- Pseudopeas foliatum Connolly, 1928
- Pseudopeas fusiforme Connolly, 1923
- Pseudopeas igembiense Connolly, 1923
- Pseudopeas imitans Connolly, 1923
- Pseudopeas iredalei Connolly, 1923
- Pseudopeas isseli (Jickeli, 1874)
- Pseudopeas kekumeganum Connolly, 1923
- Pseudopeas koruensis Pickford, 2019
- Pseudopeas musolensis Ortiz de Zárate & Ortiz de Zárate, 1959
- Pseudopeas opoboense Spence, 1928
- Pseudopeas orestias (Preston, 1911)
- Pseudopeas plebeium (Morelet, 1885)
- Pseudopeas pulchellum Putzeys, 1899
- Pseudopeas pusillum (Morelet, 1881)
- Pseudopeas rumrutiense (Preston, 1911)
- Pseudopeas saxatile (Morelet, 1885)
- Pseudopeas scalariforme Putzeys, 1899
- Pseudopeas stenoterum Connolly, 1923
- Pseudopeas subcurvelliforme Germain, 1934
- Pseudopeas tenue Connolly, 1923
- Pseudopeas thompsonae Connolly, 1928
- Pseudopeas thysvillense Pilsbry, 1919
- Pseudopeas ukaguruense Verdcourt, 1996
- Pseudopeas undulatum Connolly, 1923
- Pseudopeas valentini Fischer-Piette, Blanc, C.P., F.Blanc & Salvat, 1994
- Pseudopeas victoriae Connolly, 1919
- Pseudopeas yalaensis Germain, 1919
