= Beckianum sinistrum =

Conservation status
- Near Threatened (IUCN 2.3)

Scientific classification
- Kingdom: Animalia
- Phylum: Mollusca
- Class: Gastropoda
- Order: Stylommatophora
- Family: Achatinidae
- Genus: Beckianum
- Species: B. sinistrum

Binomial name
- Beckianum sinistrum (E. von Martens, 1898)

Species of gastropod

Beckianum sinistrum is a species of air-breathing land snails, terrestrial pulmonate gastropod mollusk in the family Achatinidae.

== Distribution ==
Distribution of this species include:

- Costa Rica
- Nicaragua
