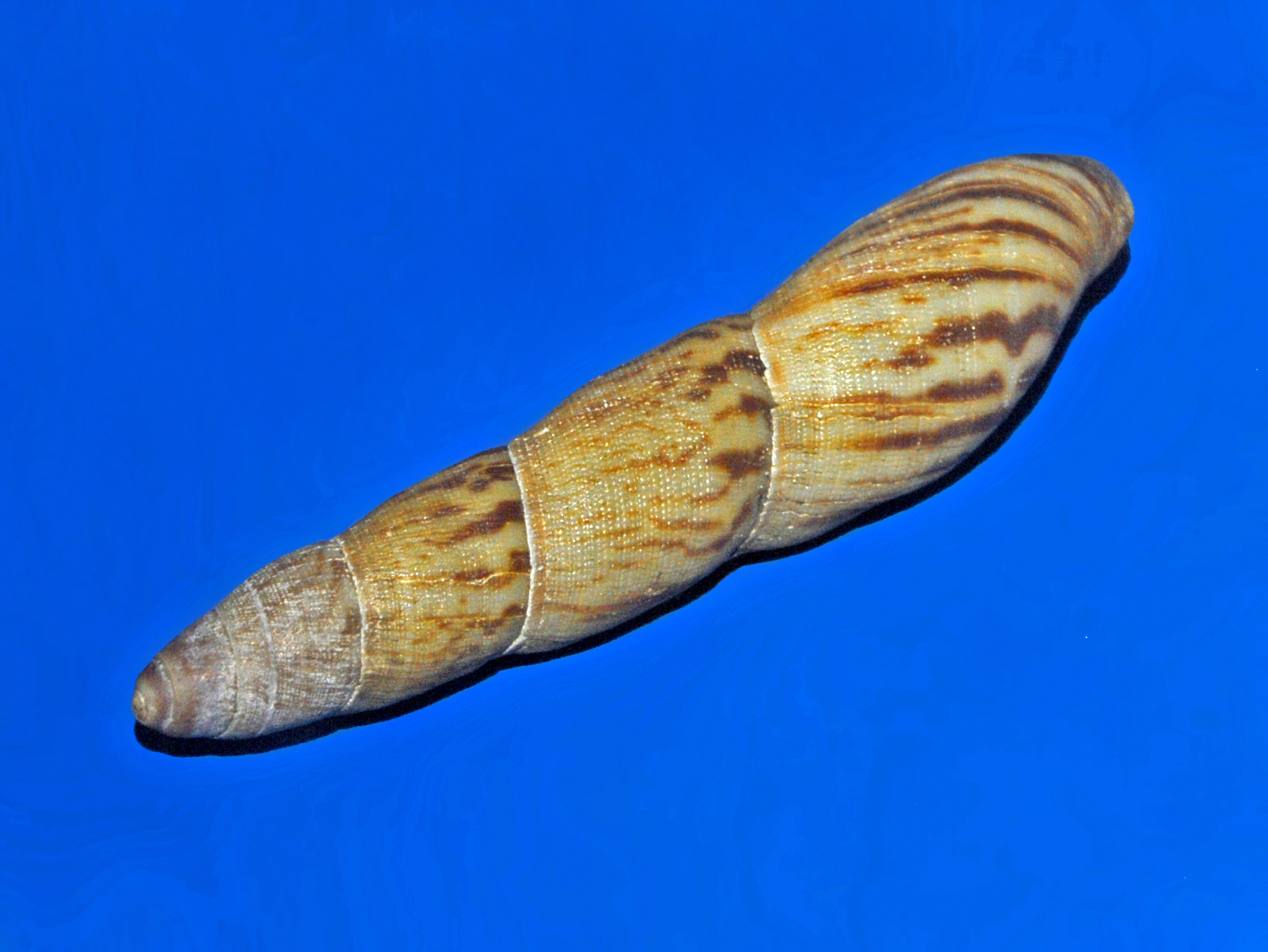
- lateral view of a shell of Columna cf. leai from São Tomé and Principe, on display at the Museo Civico di Storia Naturale di Milano

Scientific classification
- Kingdom: Animalia
- Phylum: Mollusca
- Class: Gastropoda
- Order: Stylommatophora
- Family: Achatinidae
- Genus: Columna
- Species: C. leai

Binomial name
- Columna leai Tryon, 1866

= Columna leai =

Species of gastropod

Columna leai is a species of tropical land snail, a terrestrial pulmonate gastropod mollusks in the family Achatinidae. The shell of this species is long and slender, and can reach a length of 35–50 millimetres (1.4–2.0 in). This species is native to Gabon and São Tomé and Principe.
