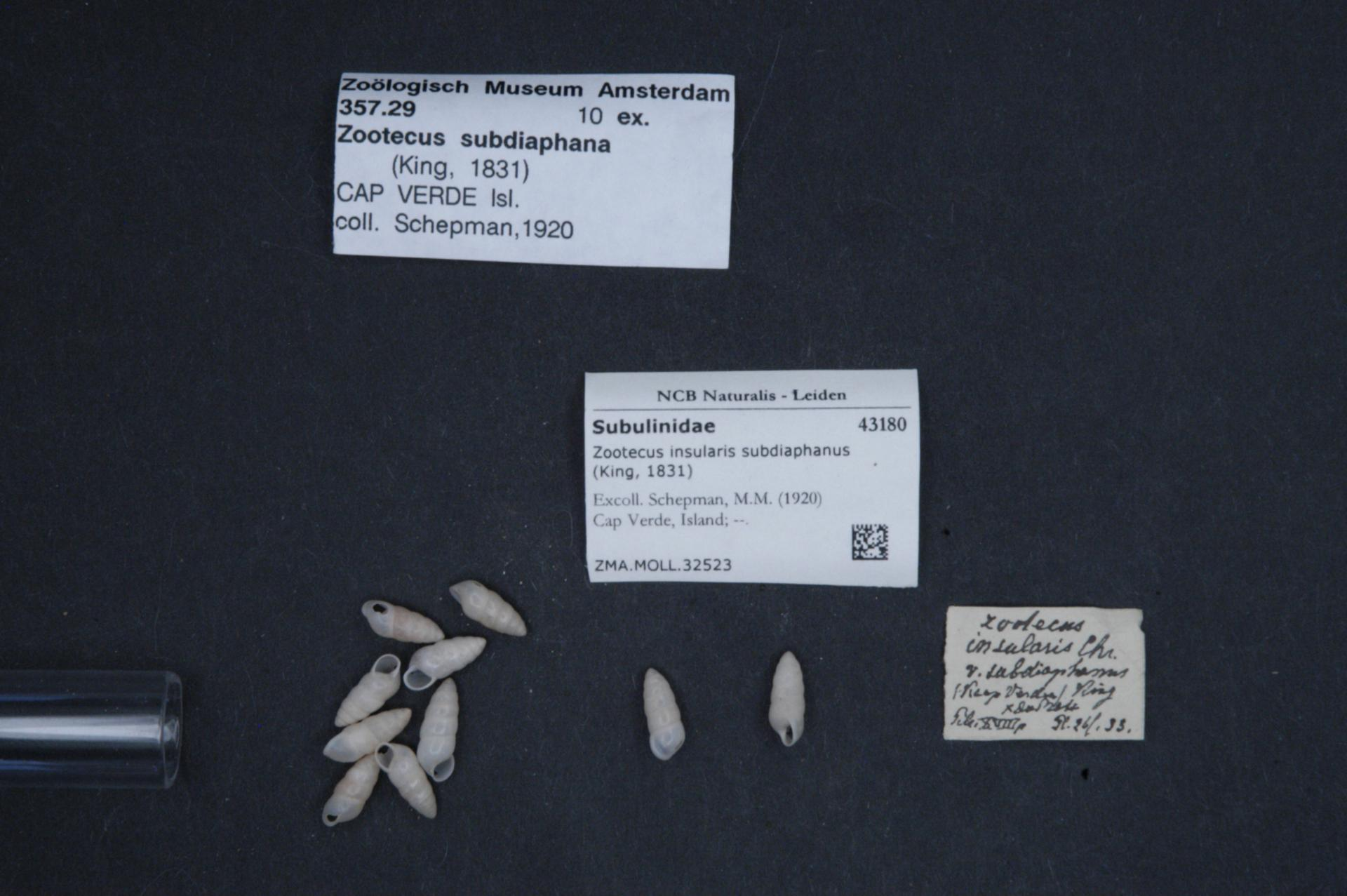

Scientific classification
- Kingdom: Animalia
- Phylum: Mollusca
- Class: Gastropoda
- Order: Stylommatophora
- Family: Achatinidae
- Genus: Zootecus
- Species: Z. insularis

Binomial name
- Zootecus insularis (Ehrenberg, 1831)

= Zootecus insularis =

Species of gastropod

Zootecus insularis is a species of gastropods belonging to the family Achatinidae.

The species is found in Africa and Southwestern Asia.
