= Euonyma curtissima =

Conservation status
- Endangered (IUCN 2.3)

Scientific classification
- Kingdom: Animalia
- Phylum: Mollusca
- Class: Gastropoda
- Order: Stylommatophora
- Family: Achatinidae
- Genus: Euonyma
- Species: E. curtissima

Binomial name
- Euonyma curtissima Verdcourt, 1968

Species of gastropod

Euonyma curtissima is a species of small tropical air-breathing land snail, terrestrial pulmonate gastropod mollusk in the family Achatinidae. This species is endemic to Kenya.
