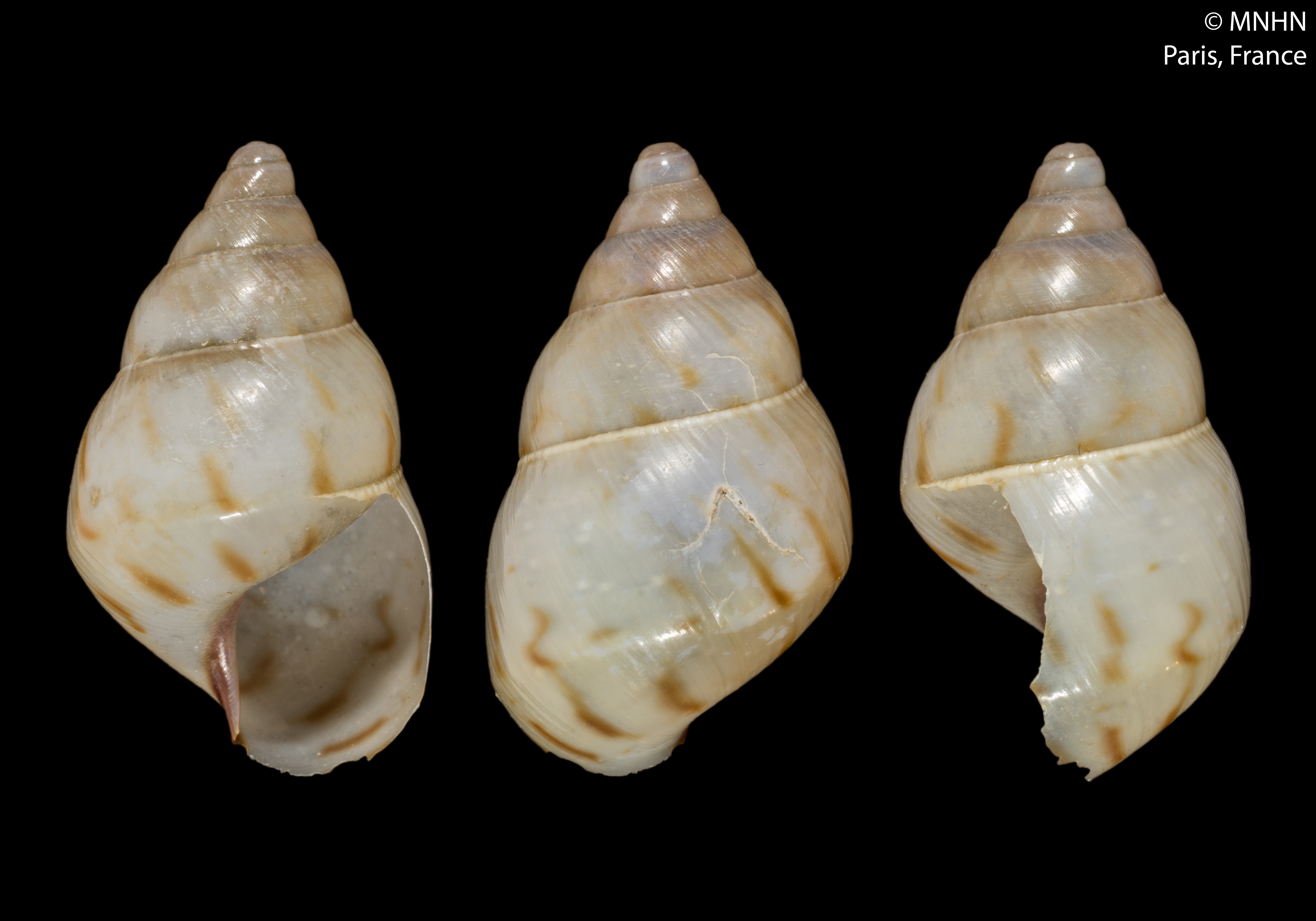
- Shell of Lignus cailleanus (syntype at MNHN, Paris)

Scientific classification
- Kingdom: Animalia
- Phylum: Mollusca
- Class: Gastropoda
- Order: Stylommatophora
- Suborder: Achatinina
- Superfamily: Achatinoidea
- Family: Achatinidae
- Genus: Lignus; Gray, 1834

Type species
- Lignus tenuis Gray, 1834

Species
- See text

Synonyms
- Perideris Shuttleworth, 1856 (primary homonym of Perideris Brandt, 1835 [Echinodermata].); Pseudotrochus Mörch, 1852

= Lignus =

Genus of gastropods

Lignus is a genus of air-breathing tropical land snails, terrestrial pulmonate gastropod mollusks in the subfamily Achatininae of the family Achatinidae.

== Species ==
- Lignus alabaster (Rang, 1831)
- Lignus batesi (Preston, 1909)
- Lignus belli (Germain, 1908)
- Lignus cailleanus (Morelet, 1848)
- Lignus efulensis (Preston, 1909)
- Lignus interstinctus (Gould, 1843)
- Lignus mucidus (Gould, 1850)
- Lignus solimanus (Morelet, 1848)
- Lignus tenuis Gray, 1834
- Lignus verdieri (Chaper, 1885)
- Lignus zegzeg (Morelet, 1848)

Taxon inquirendum

- Lignus turbinatus (I. Lea, 1841)
