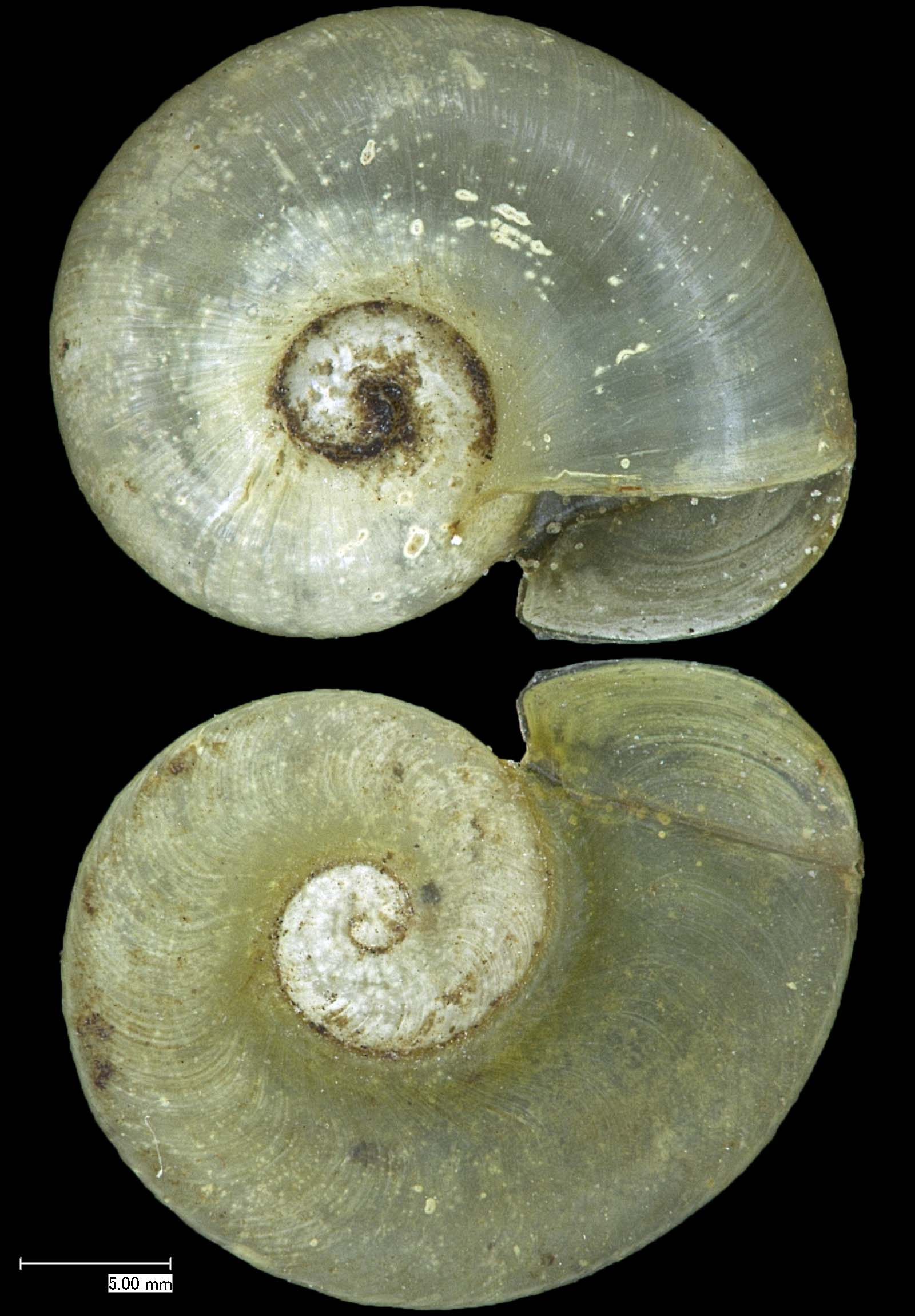

Scientific classification
- Kingdom: Animalia
- Phylum: Mollusca
- Class: Gastropoda
- Order: Stylommatophora
- Superfamily: Achatinoidea
- Family: Achatinidae
- Subfamily: Thyrophorellinae; Girard, 1895
- Genus: Thyrophorella; Greeff, 1882
- Species: T. thomensis

Binomial name
- Thyrophorella thomensis Greeff, 1882

= Thyrophorella =

Thyrophorella thomensis

Genus of gastropods

Thyrophorella is a genus of small, air-breathing land snails, terrestrial pulmonate gastropod mollusks in the family Achatinidae.

Thyrophorella is the only genus in the monotypic subfamily Thyrophorellinae, and is also itself monotypic. It is represented by the single species, Thyrophorella thomensis, which is endemic to São Tomé and Príncipe.
