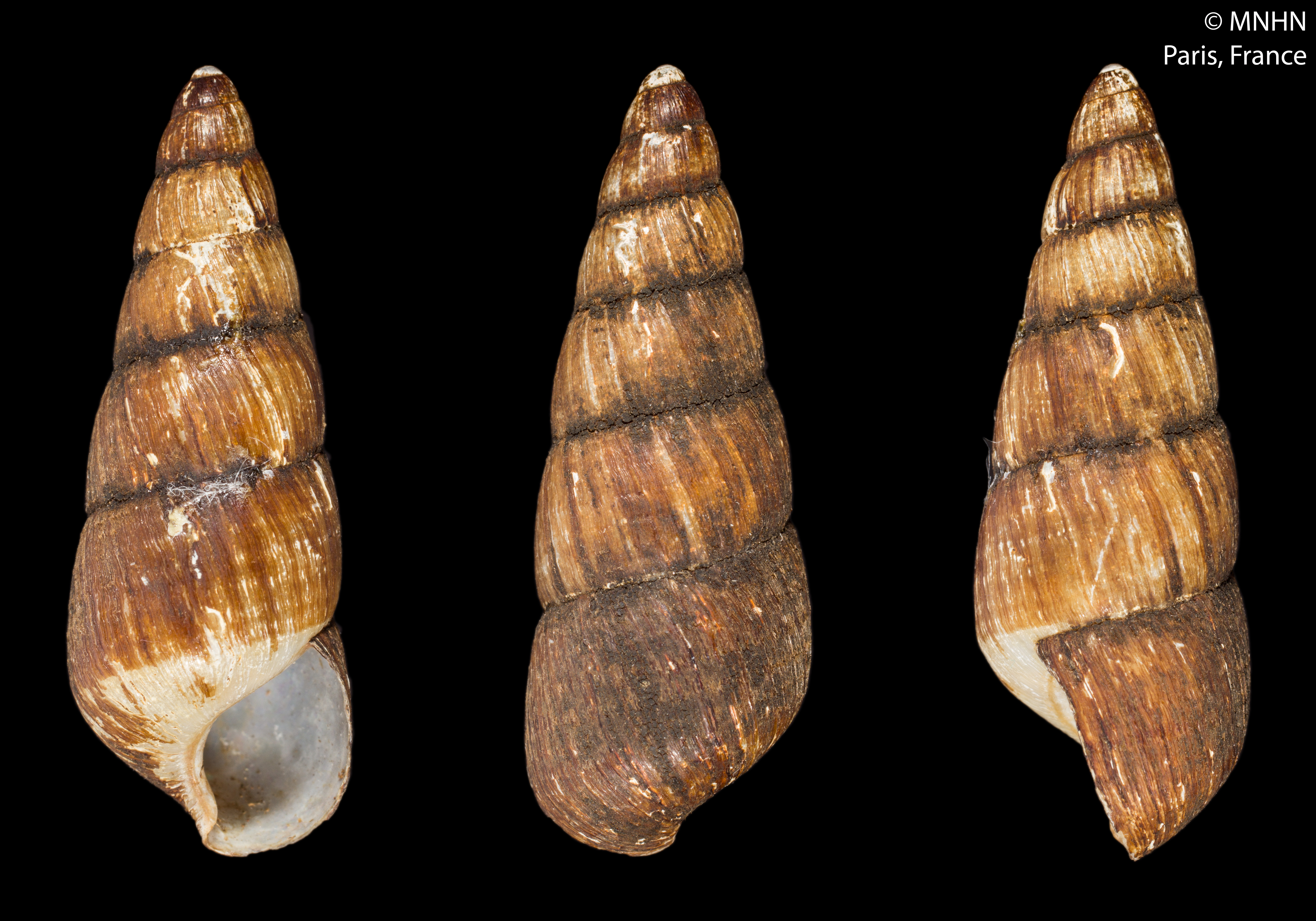
- Shell of Petriola marmorea (syntype at MNHN, Paris)

Scientific classification
- Kingdom: Animalia
- Phylum: Mollusca
- Class: Gastropoda
- Order: Stylommatophora
- Suborder: Achatinina
- Superfamily: Achatinoidea
- Family: Achatinidae
- Genus: Petriola; Dall, 1905

Type species
- Achatina marmorea Reeve, 1850

Synonyms
- Bocageia (Petriola) Dall, 1905; Trichodina Ancey, 1888 (invalid: junior homonym of Trichodina Ehrenberg, 1832 [Foraminifera]; see Petriola)

= Petriola =

Extinct genus of gastropods

Petriola is a genus of air-breathing land snails, terrestrial pulmonate gastropod molluscs in the subfamily Petriolinae of the family Achatinidae.

== Species ==
- Petriola anjouanensis (Pilsbry, 1909)
- Petriola clavus (L. Pfeiffer, 1846)
- Petriola comorensis (L. Pfeiffer, 1856)
- Petriola marmorea (Reeve, 1850)
- Petriola monacha (Morelet, 1886)
- Petriola monticola (Morelet, 1866)
- Petriola simpularia (Morelet, 1851)
