= Columna =

Columna may refer to:

- Columna (gastropod) a genus of snails
- The Column (film), a 1968 Romanian historical film directed by Mircea Drăgan .
- Columna Lactaria "Milk Column" was a landmark in ancient Rome in the Forum Holitorium
