= Limicolariopsis =

Scientific classification
- Domain: Eukaryota
- Kingdom: Animalia
- Phylum: Mollusca
- Class: Gastropoda
- Order: Stylommatophora
- Suborder: Achatinina
- Superfamily: Achatinoidea
- Family: Achatinidae
- Genus: Limicolariopsis d'Ailly, 1910

Genus of land snails

Limicolariopsis is a genus of gastropods belonging to the family Achatinidae.

The species of this genus are found in Africa.

Species:

- Limicolariopsis cylindrica Crowley & Pain, 1961
- Limicolariopsis dohertyi (E.A.Smith, 1901)
- Limicolariopsis donaldsoni (Pilsbry, 1897)
- Limicolariopsis elgonensis Crowley & Pain, 1961
- Limicolariopsis ellisi Crowley & Pain, 1964
- Limicolariopsis inepta (Preston, 1911)
- Limicolariopsis keniana (E.A.Smith, 1903)
- Limicolariopsis kivuensis (Preston, 1913)
- Limicolariopsis laevis Crowley & Pain, 1961
- Limicolariopsis nyiroensis (Preston, 1912)
- Limicolariopsis obtusa Thiele, 1933
- Limicolariopsis percurta (Preston, 1912)
- Limicolariopsis perobtusa (Preston, 1912)
- Limicolariopsis ruwenzoriensis Pilsbry, 1919
- Limicolariopsis sjostedti D'Ailly, 1910
- Limicolariopsis verdcourti Crowley & Pain, 1961
- Limicolariopsis wagneri Knipper, 1956
