= Hypolysia usambarica =

Conservation status
- Data Deficient (IUCN 2.3)

Scientific classification
- Kingdom: Animalia
- Phylum: Mollusca
- Class: Gastropoda
- Order: Stylommatophora
- Family: Achatinidae
- Genus: Hypolysia
- Species: H. usambarica

Binomial name
- Hypolysia usambarica Verdcourt, 1957

Species of gastropod

Hypolysia usambarica is a species of small tropical air-breathing land snails, terrestrial pulmonate gastropod molluscs in the family Achatinidae. This species is endemic to Tanzania.
