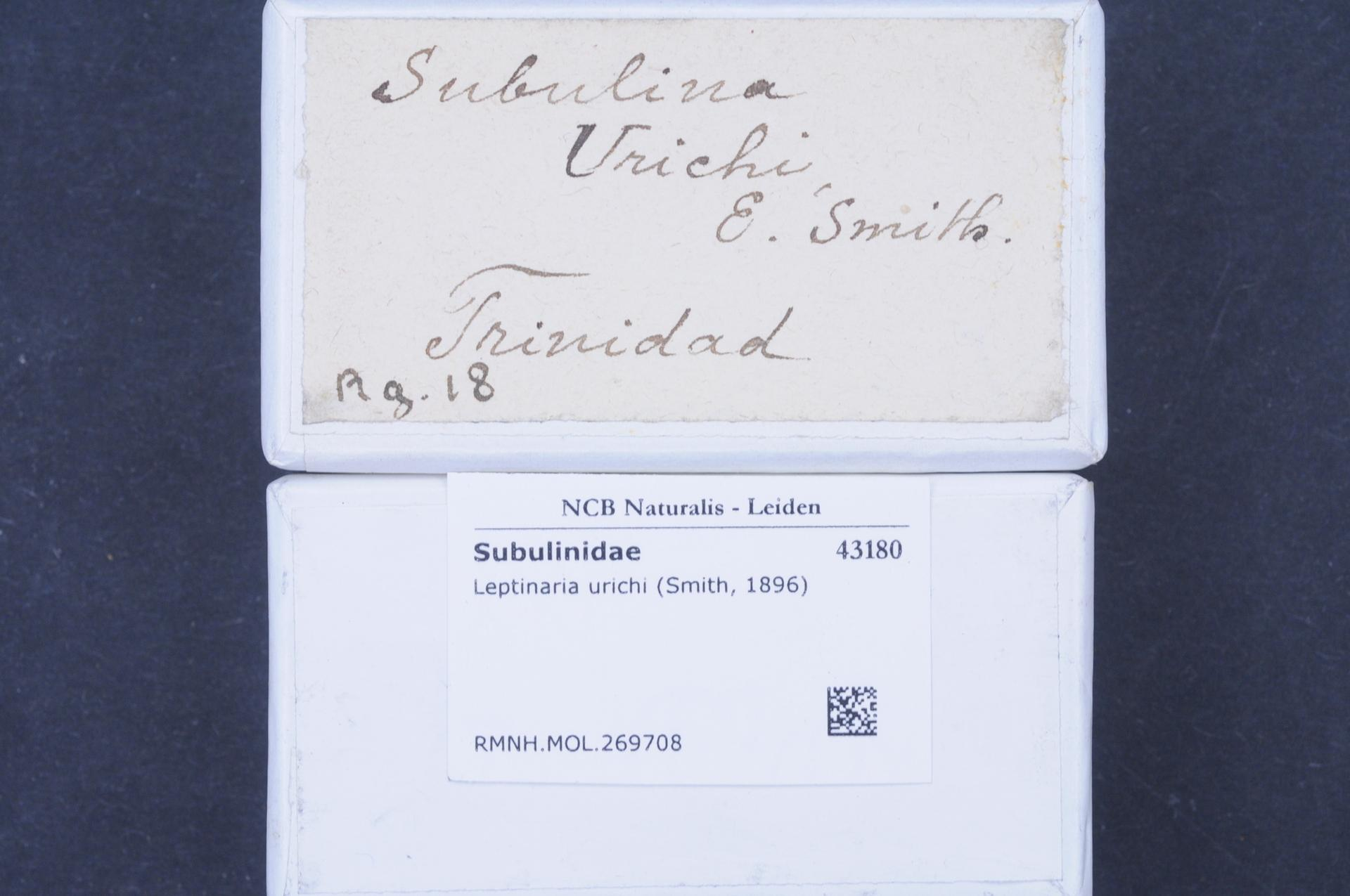
- Leptinaria Urchi specimen

Scientific classification
- Kingdom: Animalia
- Phylum: Mollusca
- Class: Gastropoda
- Order: Stylommatophora
- Superfamily: Achatinoidea
- Family: Achatinidae
- Subfamily: Subulininae
- Genus: Leptinaria; Beck, 1837

= Leptinaria =

Genus of gastropods

Leptinaria is a genus of small tropical air-breathing land snails, terrestrial pulmonate gastropod mollusks in the family Achatinidae.

== Species ==
Species within the genus Leptinaria include:

- Leptinaria ambigua Martens, 1898
- Leptinaria biolleyi Martens, 1898
- Leptinaria convoluta Martens, 1898
- Leptinaria costaricana Martens, 1898
- Leptinaria crenulata Martens, 1898
- Leptinaria guatemalensis (Crosse & Fischer, 1877)
- Leptinaria hapaloides Martens, 1898
- Leptinaria insignis (Smith, 1898)
- Leptinaria interstriata (Tate, 1870)
- Leptinaria pittieri pittieri Martens, 1898
- Leptinaria pittieri obliquata Martens, 1898
- Leptinaria solida Martens, 1898
- Leptinaria strebeliana Pilsbry, 1907
- Leptinaria tamaulipensis Pilsbry, 1903
- Leptinaria unilamellata (d'Orbigny, 1837) - synonym: Leptinaria lamellata (Potiez & Michaud, 1838)
- Leptinaria sp. - endemic from Nicaragua
