= Opeas hannense =

Conservation status
- Secure (NatureServe)

Scientific classification
- Kingdom: Animalia
- Phylum: Mollusca
- Class: Gastropoda
- Order: Stylommatophora
- Family: Achatinidae
- Genus: Opeas
- Species: O. hannense

Binomial name
- Opeas hannense (Rang, 1831)

Synonyms
- Helix hannensis Rang, 1831; Opeas pumilum (L. Pfeiffer, 1840) (junior synonym)

Species of gastropod

Opeas hannense, common name the dwarf awlsnail, is a species of air-breathing land snail, a terrestrial pulmonate gastropod mollusk in the family Achatinidae.

== Distribution ==
Non-indigenous:

- Great Britain as a "hothouse alien".
- Canada
