= Euonyma laeocochlis =

Scientific classification
- Kingdom: Animalia
- Phylum: Mollusca
- Class: Gastropoda
- Order: Stylommatophora
- Family: Achatinidae
- Genus: Euonyma
- Species: E. laeocochlis

Binomial name
- Euonyma laeocochlis (Melvill & Ponsonby, 1896)

Synonyms
- Subulina laeocochlis Melvill & Ponsonby, 1896

Species of gastropod

Euonyma laeocochlis is a species of an air-breathing land snail, terrestrial pulmonate gastropod mollusk in the family Achatinidae.

E. laeocochlis is the type species of the genus Euonyma.

This species has not been collected since its original description in 1896. Herbert (2006) rediscovered this species in South Africa in 2006.

== Distribution ==
This species is endemic to South Africa. The type locality is "Humansdorp, St. Francis Bay", South Africa.

== Description ==
E. laeocochlis has been described by British malacologists James Cosmo Melvill (1845-1929) and by John Henry Ponsonby-Fane (1848-1916) in 1896. Its type description read as follow:

Shell sinistral, fusiform, the upper whorls somewhat attenuate; whorls thirteen in number, mostly very narrow,

broadening distinctly towards the base. The specimens (two) before us being dead, we cannot tell the colour, but probably it is pale olivaceous. The whorls are nearly smooth, but are obscurely longitudinally obliquely striate, the basal whorl slightly angled in front; aperture oblong, the columellar margin being straightly produced and slightly

reflexed.
