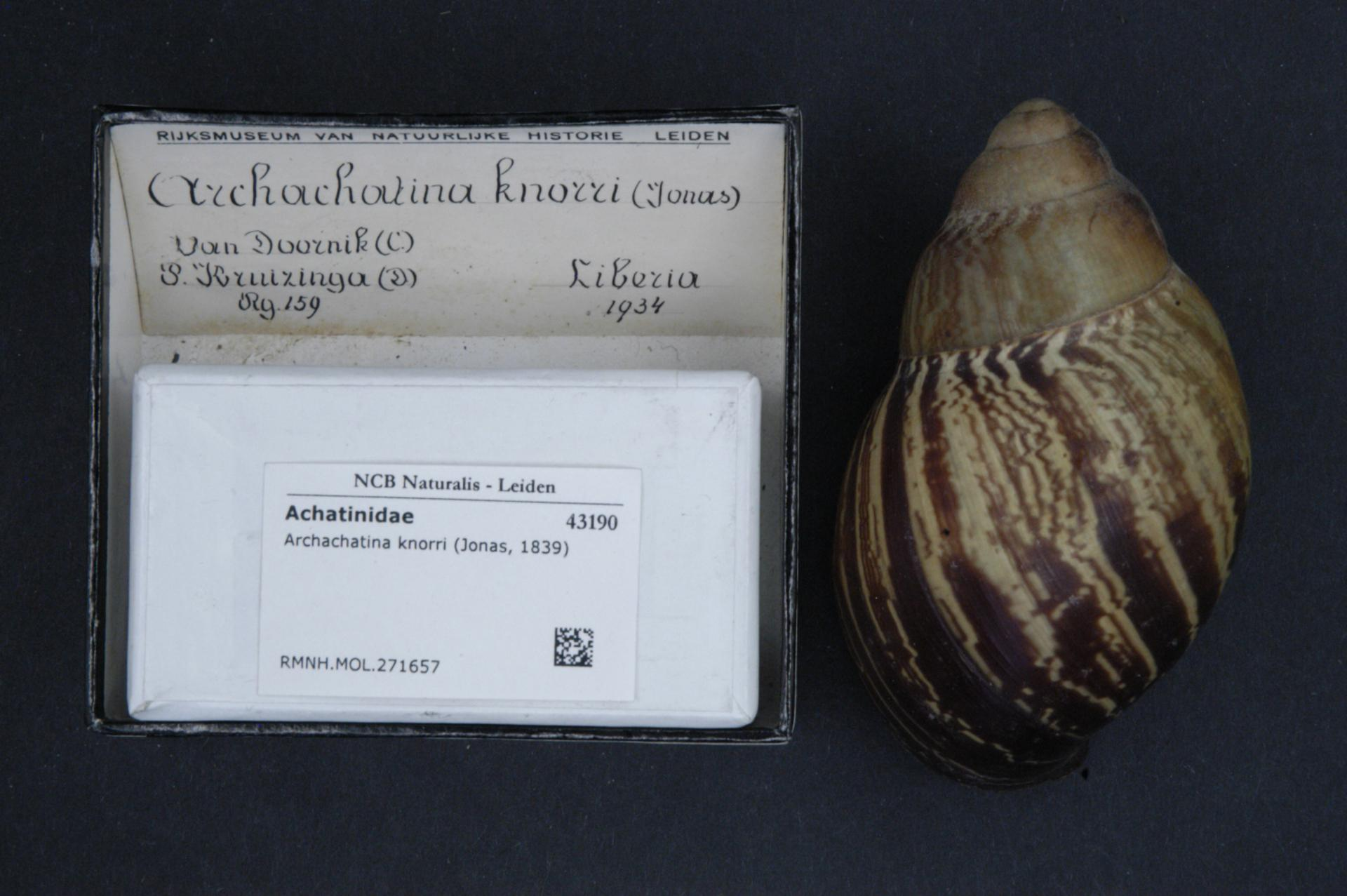

Conservation status
- Data Deficient (IUCN 2.3)

Scientific classification
- Kingdom: Animalia
- Phylum: Mollusca
- Class: Gastropoda
- Order: Stylommatophora
- Family: Achatinidae
- Genus: Archachatina
- Species: A. knorri

Binomial name
- Archachatina knorri Jonas, 1839

= Archachatina knorri =

Species of gastropod

Archachatina knorri is a species of large air-breathing land snail, a terrestrial pulmonate gastropod mollusk in the family Achatinidae. This species is endemic to Liberia.
