= Thomea =

Scientific classification
- Domain: Eukaryota
- Kingdom: Animalia
- Phylum: Mollusca
- Class: Gastropoda
- Order: Stylommatophora
- Suborder: Achatinina
- Superfamily: Achatinoidea
- Family: Achatinidae
- Genus: Thomea; Girard, 1893

Genus of gastropods

Thomea is a genus of air-breathing land snails, terrestrial gastropod mollusks in the family Achatinidae.

== Species ==
Species within the genus Thomea include:

- Thomea newtoni
