= Leptinaria strebeliana =

Conservation status
- Near Threatened (IUCN 2.3)

Scientific classification
- Kingdom: Animalia
- Phylum: Mollusca
- Class: Gastropoda
- Order: Stylommatophora
- Family: Achatinidae
- Genus: Leptinaria
- Species: L. strebeliana

Binomial name
- Leptinaria strebeliana Pilsbry, 1907

Species of gastropod

Leptinaria strebeliana is a species of small tropical air-breathing land snails, terrestrial pulmonate gastropod mollusks in the family Achatinidae.

== Distribution ==
This species is endemic to Nicaragua.
