= Lavajatus =

Scientific classification
- Kingdom: Animalia
- Phylum: Mollusca
- Class: Gastropoda
- Order: Stylommatophora
- Family: Achatinidae
- Genus: Lavajatus; Simone, 2018
- Species: L. moroi

Binomial name
- Lavajatus moroi Simone, 2018

Genus of land snails

Lavajatus is a monotypic genus of gastropods belonging to the family Achatinidae. The only species is Lavajatus moroi.

The species is found in Brazil.
