= Striosubulina =

Scientific classification
- Kingdom: Animalia
- Phylum: Mollusca
- Class: Gastropoda
- Order: Stylommatophora
- Family: Achatinidae
- Subfamily: Subulininae
- Genus: Striosubulina; Thiele, 1933

Genus of gastropods

Striosubulina is a genus of small, tropical, air-breathing land snails, terrestrial pulmonate gastropod mollusks in the family Achatinidae.

== Species ==
The genus Striosubulina includes the following species:

- Striosubulina striatella Rang
