= Hypolysia =

Scientific classification
- Kingdom: Animalia
- Phylum: Mollusca
- Class: Gastropoda
- Order: Stylommatophora
- Family: Achatinidae
- Subfamily: Subulininae
- Genus: Hypolysia; Melvill & Ponsonby, 1901

Genus of gastropods

Hypolysia is a genus of small tropical air-breathing land snails, terrestrial pulmonate gastropod mollusks in the family Achatinidae.

== Species ==
Species within the genus Hypolysia include: It contains the following species:

- Hypolysia connollyana
- Hypolysia usambarica
