= Kempioconcha conradti =

Conservation status
- Data Deficient (IUCN 2.3)

Scientific classification
- Kingdom: Animalia
- Phylum: Mollusca
- Class: Gastropoda
- Order: Stylommatophora
- Family: Achatinidae
- Genus: Kempioconcha
- Species: K. conradti

Binomial name
- Kempioconcha conradti (von Martens, 1895)

Synonyms
- Pseudoglessula conradti von Martens, 1895

Species of gastropod

Kempioconcha conradti is a species of small air-breathing land snail, a terrestrial pulmonate gastropod mollusk in the family Achatinidae. This species is endemic to Tanzania.
