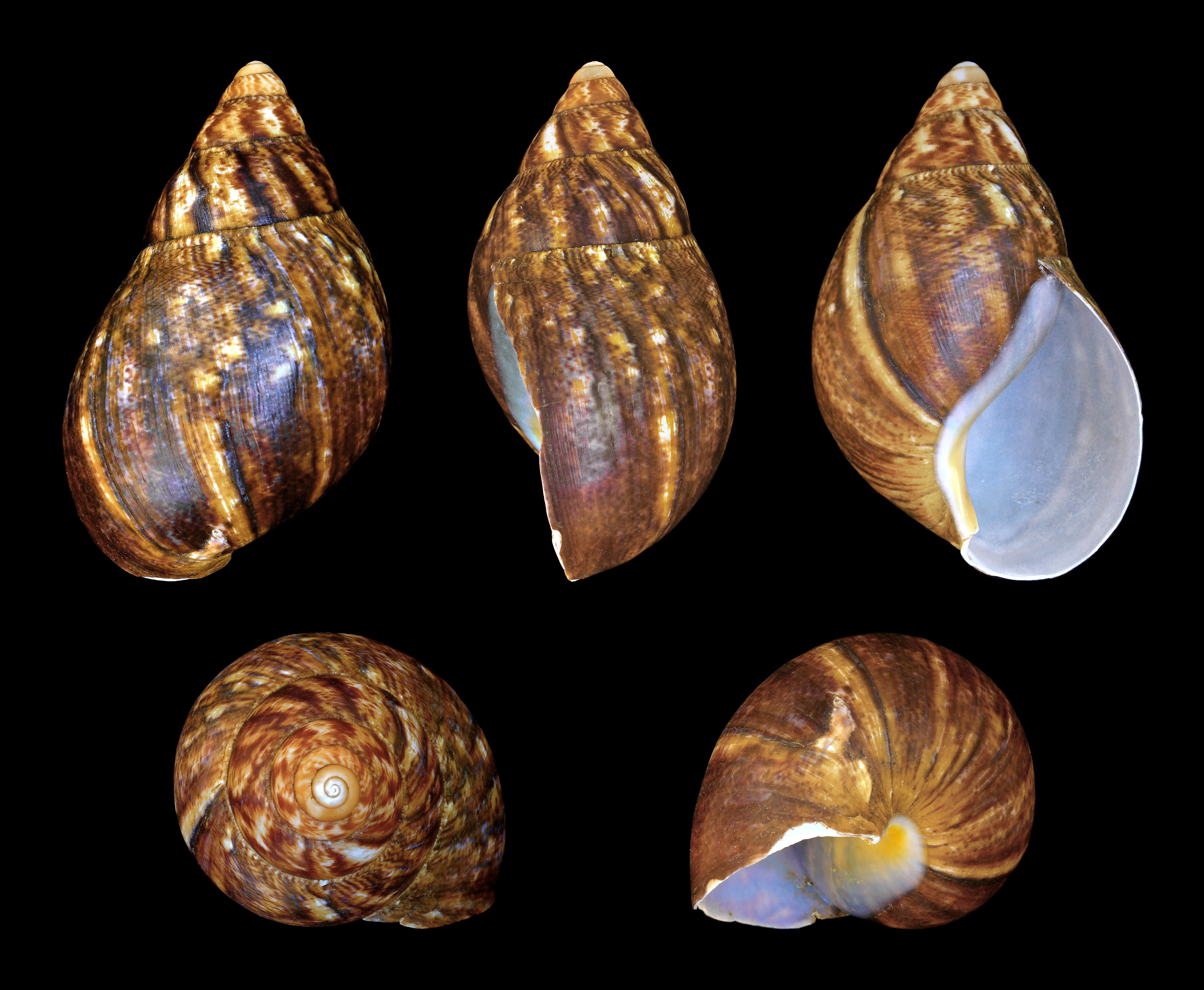

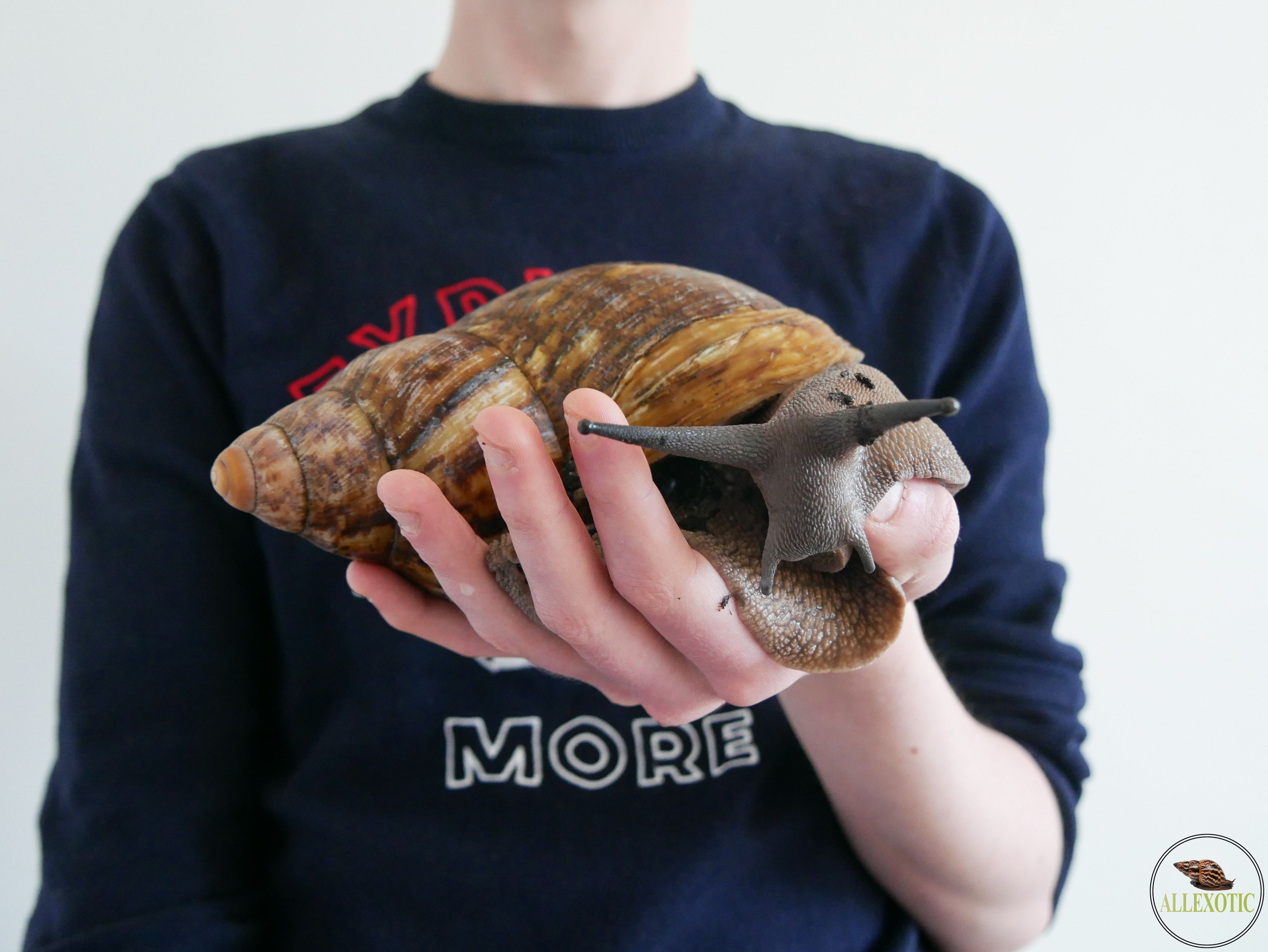

Scientific classification
- Kingdom: Animalia
- Phylum: Mollusca
- Class: Gastropoda
- Order: Stylommatophora
- Family: Achatinidae
- Genus: Archachatina
- Species: A. marginata

Binomial name
- Archachatina marginata (Swainson, 1821)

= Archachatina marginata =

Species of gastropod

The giant West African snail or banana rasp snail (Archachatina marginata) is a species of air-breathing tropical land snail, a terrestrial pulmonate gastropod mollusk in the family Achatinidae. They can grow up to 20 centimetres (8 in) long, and live up to 10 years or more.

== Distribution ==
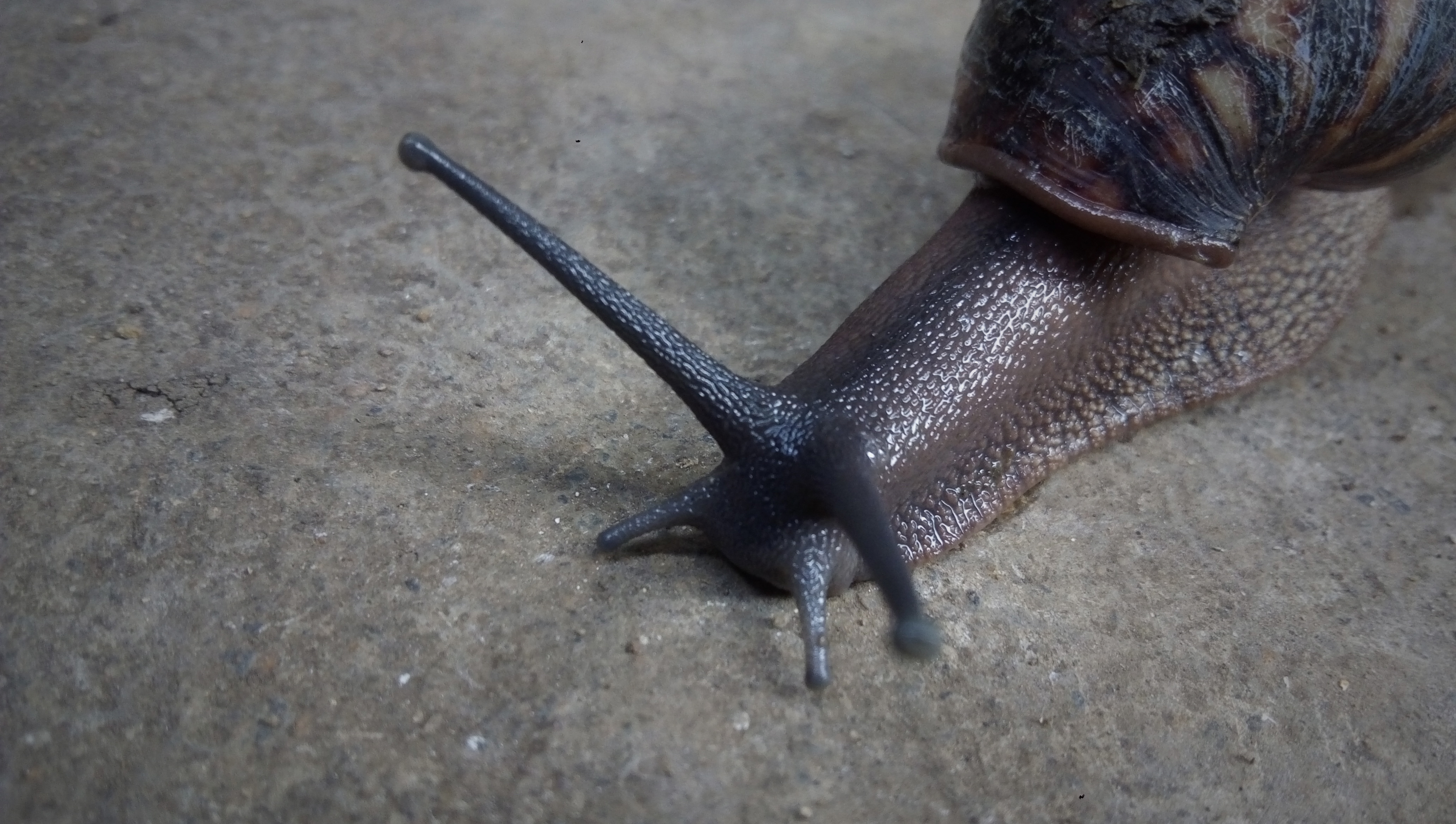
Head view of a West African Giant Snail found in Cameroon

This species occurs in Western Africa (Cameroon to the Democratic Republic of the Congo) and the Caribbean (Martinique). How the species reached Martinique is unknown, but they may have been intentionally introduced as "pets" or by workers returning from West Africa.

The natural spread of this species is very slow; however, unintentional spread by individuals for food and as folk medicine is very common. The USDA routinely checks for the species in the luggage of travelers from West Africa, particularly those from Nigeria, Ghana, and Cameroon.

This species has not yet become established in the United States, but it is considered to represent a potentially serious threat as a pest, an invasive species that could negatively affect agriculture, natural ecosystems, human health, or commerce. Therefore, this species may be given top national quarantine significance in the United States.

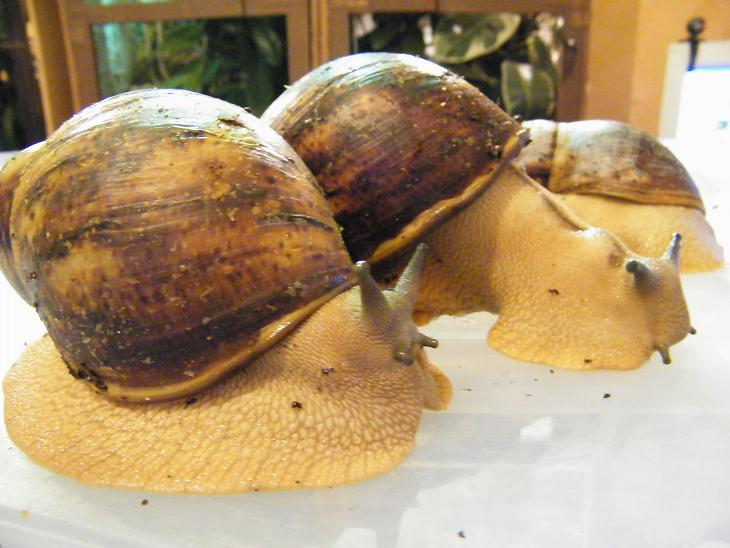
Archachatina marginata var. ovum (Pfeiffer, 1858)

== Description ==
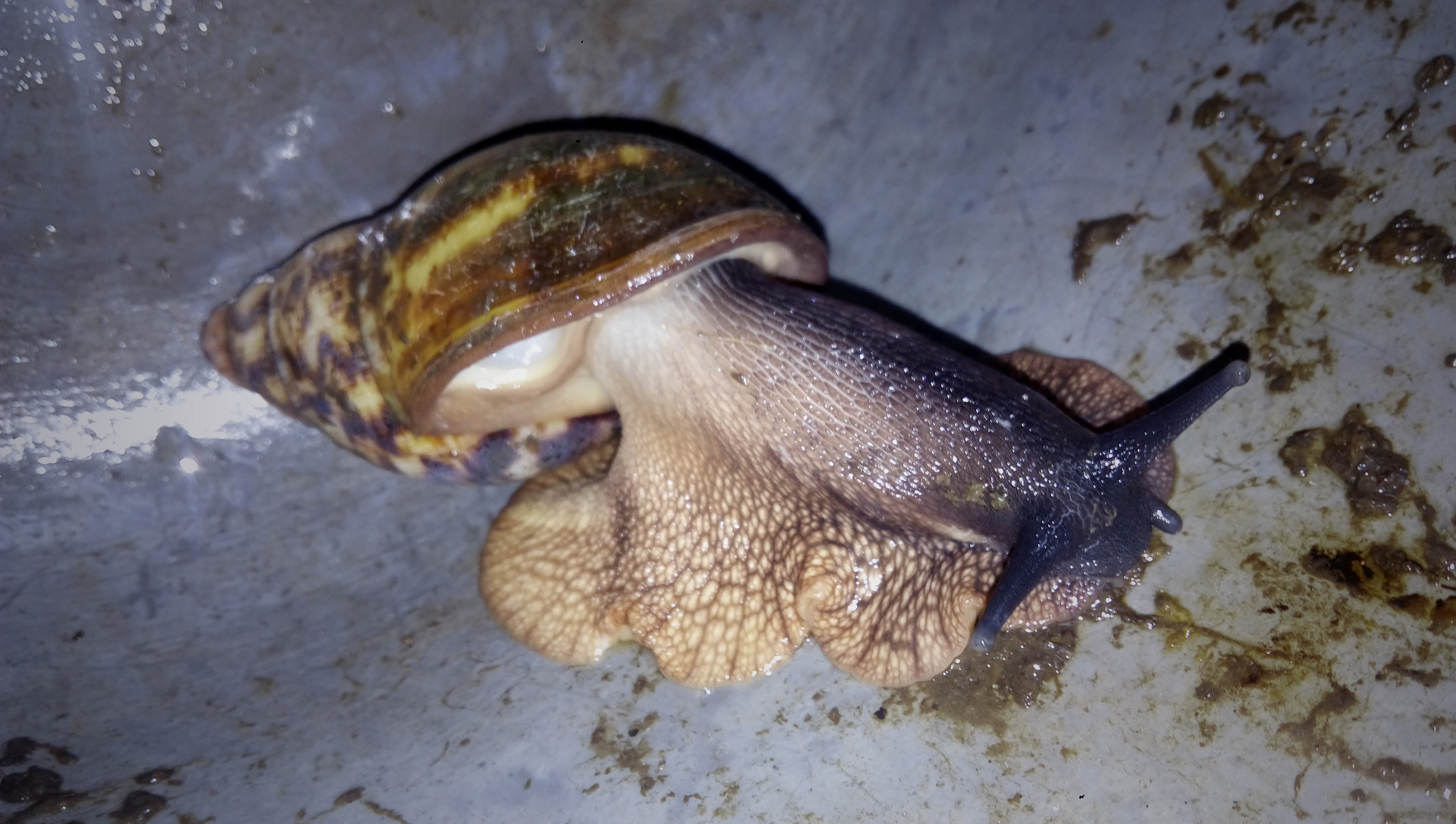
Full view of a West African Giant Snail found in Cameroon

The snail has a bulbous, large, and broad protoconch, with a white or bluish-white columella, parietal wall, and outer lip. The shell of the snail can grow up to 21 cm in height, and 13 cm in diameter. The shell, when magnified, has the appearance of a woven texture.

=== Invasive species ===
The snail feeds on a variety of plants, including economically important crops such as bananas, lettuce, peanuts, and peas. There are also possible public health ramifications of the spread of the snail as an invasive species: it is a carrier of the parasitic rat lungworm, which causes angiostrongyliasis, which in turn is the most common cause of the eosinophilic meningitis or eosinophilic meningoencephalitis.

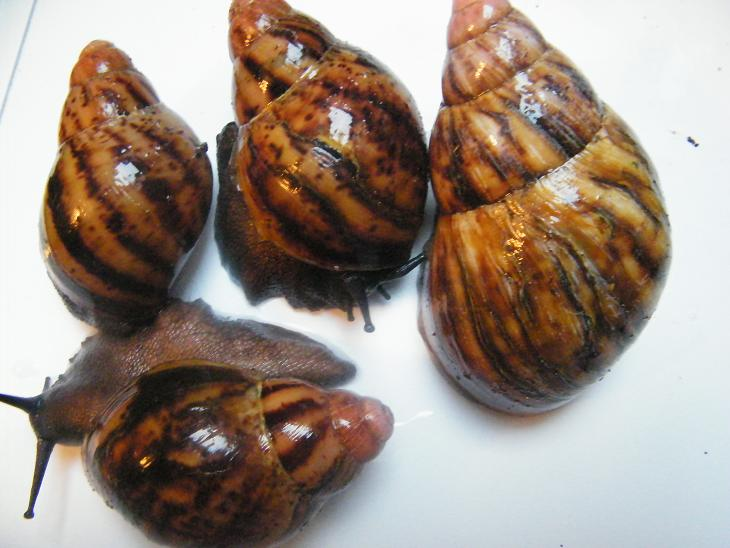
Archachatina marginata var. suturalis (Philippi, 1849)

== Ecology ==
Achatinids are nocturnal forest dwellers, but can adapt to disturbed habitats. They prefer concealed habitats, and if overcrowding occurs, they may colonize more open habitats. During periods of high humidity, achatinids are more active, but individuals being found during broad daylight are most likely due to high population density.

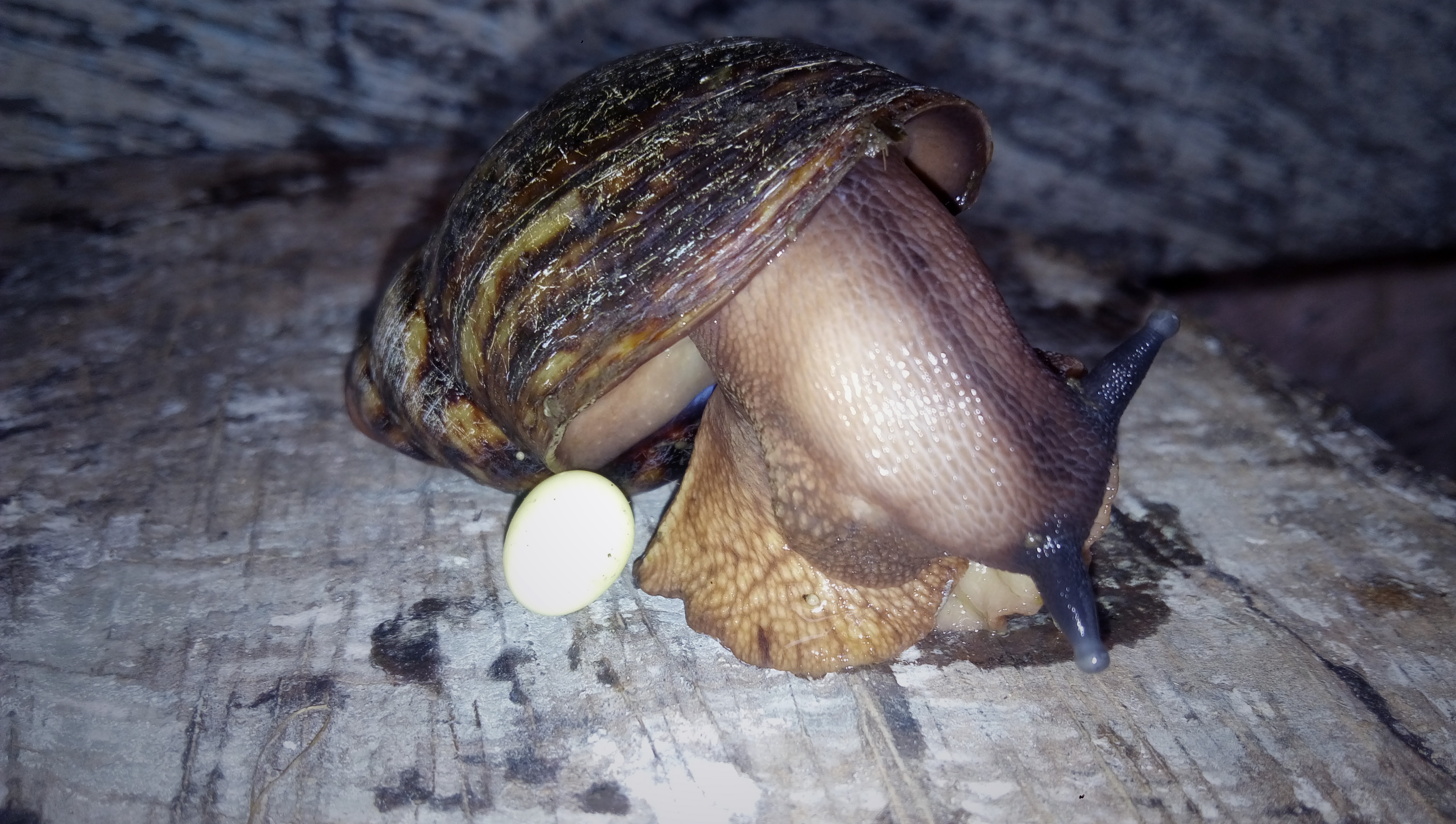
Giant African land snail after laying an egg in Cameroon

Eggs of achatinids are normally laid in the soil, but can be found under leaves or rocks. They produce as many as 40 eggs, which are yellow in color with dark blotches, and their incubation period is about 40 days.

== Nervous system ==
In this organism's nervous system, the two main types of nerves are pallial and visceral. Pallial nerves are the subject of the majority of scientific research. Visceral nerves are split into the main visceral nerve and the rectal visceral nerve. The main visceral nerve is on the snail's back and connects to a large group of nerve cells to transmit information in the body. The rectal visceral nerve starts further down under the main visceral and extends a short length before branching off near the rectum.

Heat can stimulate reactions in the West African snail as a result of the snail's nervous system. The nerves produce warm responsive fibers when the temperature exceeds 25 °C and produce cold responsive fibers when the temperature falls below 19 °C. The ideal temperature range for this species falls between 13 and 32 °C, the thermopreferendum of the species.

== Subspecies ==
- A. m. var. ovum
- A. m. var. suturalis
- A. m. var. marginata
- A. m. var. egregia
- A. m. var. eduardi
- A. m. var. candefacta
- A. m. var. grevillei
- A. m. var. icterica
- A. m. var. ikom

== See also ==
- List of non-marine molluscs of Nigeria
