= Euonyma =

Scientific classification
- Kingdom: Animalia
- Phylum: Mollusca
- Class: Gastropoda
- Order: Stylommatophora
- Family: Achatinidae
- Subfamily: Subulininae
- Genus: Euonyma; Melvill & Ponsonby, 1896

Genus of gastropods

Euonyma is a genus of small tropical air-breathing land snails, terrestrial pulmonate gastropod mollusks in the family Achatinidae.

== Species ==
The genus Euonyma includes:

- Euonyma curtissima Verdcourt
- Euonyma laeocochlis (Melvill & Ponsonby, 1896) - type species
