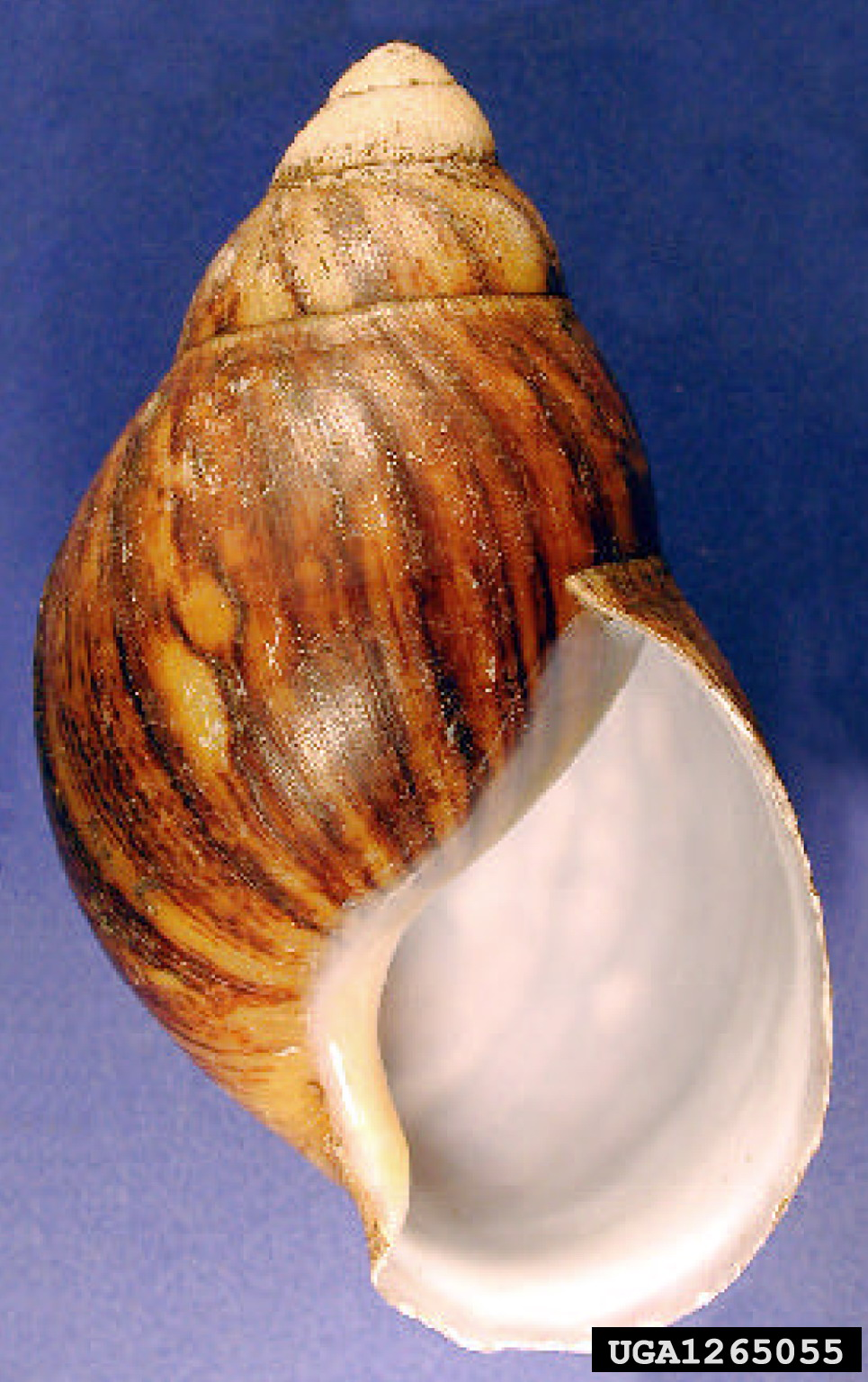
- Apertural view of a shell of Archachatina marginata

Scientific classification
- Kingdom: Animalia
- Phylum: Mollusca
- Class: Gastropoda
- Order: Stylommatophora
- Family: Achatinidae
- Genus: Archachatina; Albers, 1850

Synonyms
- Archachatina (Archachatina) Albers, 1850· accepted, alternate representation; Archachatina (Calachatina) Pilsbry, 1919· accepted, alternate representation; Archachatina (Megachatinopsis) Bequaert & Clench, 1936· accepted, alternate representation; Archachatina (Tholachatina) Bequaert, 1950· accepted, alternate representation; Megachatina Bequaert & Clench, 1936; Tholachatina Bequaert, 1950

= Archachatina =

Genus of gastropods

Archachatina is a genus of large tropical air-breathing land snails, terrestrial pulmonate gastropod mollusks in the family Achatinidae.

== Species ==
Species in the genus Archachatina include:

- Archachatina bicarinata (Bruguière, 1789) - São Tomé and Principe
- Archachatina burnupi (E.A. Smith, 1890)
- Archachatina buylaerti
- Archachatina camerunensis d'Ailly, 1896
- Archachatina cinnamomea Mellvil & Ponsonby, 1894
- Archachatina cinnamomea J.C. Melvill & J.H. Ponsonby, 1894
- Archachatina crawfordi Morelet, 1889
- Archachatina degneri Bequaert & Clench, 1936 - Ghana
- Archachatina gaboonensis Pilsbry, 1933 - Gabon
- Archachatina insularis T.E. Crowley & T. Pain, 1961
- Archachatina knorri (Jonas, 1839)
- Archachatina marginata (Swainson, 1821) - giant West African snail, Cameroon through Zaire
  - Archachatina m. var. suturalis (Philippi, 1849) - São Tomé and Príncipe
- Archachatina marinae Sirgel - South Africa
- Archachatina papyracea (Pfeiffer, 1845) - Cameroon
  - Archachatina p. adelinae Pilsbry, 1905
- Archachatina pentheri (R. Sturany, 1898)
- Archachatina porphyrostoma H.A. Pilsbry, 1905
- Archachatina purpurea (Gmelin, 1790) - Ghana
- Archachatina puylaerti A.R. Mead, 1998
- Archachatina rhodostoma (R.A. Philippi, 1849)
- Archachatina siderata (L.A. Reeve, 1849)
- Archachatina subcylindrica H.B. Preston, 1909
- Archachatina transvaalensis (E.A. Smith, 1878)
- Archachatina ventricosa Gould, 1850 - Liberia, Sierra Leone, Côte d'Ivoire
  - Archachatina v. spectaculum Pilsbry, 1933 - Sierra Leone
- Archachatina viridescens C.M.F. Ancey

Species brought into synonymy

- Archachatina bequaerti Crowley & Pain, 1961 - Malawi: synonym of Bruggenina bequaerti (Crowley & Pain, 1961) (original combination)
- Archachatina churchilliana (J.C. Melvill & J.H. Ponsonby, 1895): synonym of Cochlitoma churchilliana (Melvill & Ponsonby, 1895) (superseded combination)
- Archachatina dimidiata (E.A. Smith, 1878) - southeastern Africa: synonym of Cochlitoma dimidiata (E. A. Smith, 1878) (superseded combination)
- Archachatina drakensbergensis (J.C. Melvill & J.H. Ponsonby, 1895): synonym of Cochlitoma drakensbergensis (Melvill & Ponsonby, 1897) (superseded combination)
- Archachatina granulata (Krauss, 1848) - South Africa: synonym of Cochlitoma granulata (F. Krauss, 1848) (superseded combination)
- Archachatina limitanea A.C. van Bruggen, 1984: synonym of Cochlitoma limitanea (van Bruggen, 1984) (superseded combination)
- Archachatina montistempli van Bruggen, 1965 - South Africa: synonym of Cochlitoma montistempli (van Bruggen, 1965) (superseded combination)
- Archachatina omissa van Bruggen, 1965 - South Africa: synonym of Cochlitoma omissa (van Bruggen, 1965) (superseded combination)
- Archachatina parthenia (J.C. Melvill & J.H. Ponsonby, 1895): synonym of Cochlitoma parthenia (Melvill & Ponsonby, 1903) (superseded combination)
- Archachatina sanctaeluciae A.C. van Bruggen, 1989: synonym of Cochlitoma churchilliana (Melvill & Ponsonby, 1895) (junior synonym)
- Archachatina semidecussata (Pfeiffer, 1846): synonym of Cochlitoma semidecussata (L. Pfeiffer, 1846) (superseded combination)
- Archachatina semigranosa L. Pfeiffer, 1861: synonym of Cochlitoma semigranosa (Pfeiffer, 1861) (superseded combination)
- Archachatina simplex E.A. Smith, 1878: synonym of Cochlitoma simplex (E. A. Smith, 1878) (superseded combination)
- Archachatina ustulata (Lamarck, 1822) - South Africa: synonym of Cochlitoma ustulata (Lamarck, 1822) (superseded combination)
- Archachatina vestita Pfeiffer, 1855: synonym of Cochlitoma vestita (L. Pfeiffer, 1855) (superseded combination)
- Archachatina zuluensis Connolly - South Africa: synonym of Cochlitoma churchilliana (Melvill & Ponsonby, 1895)
