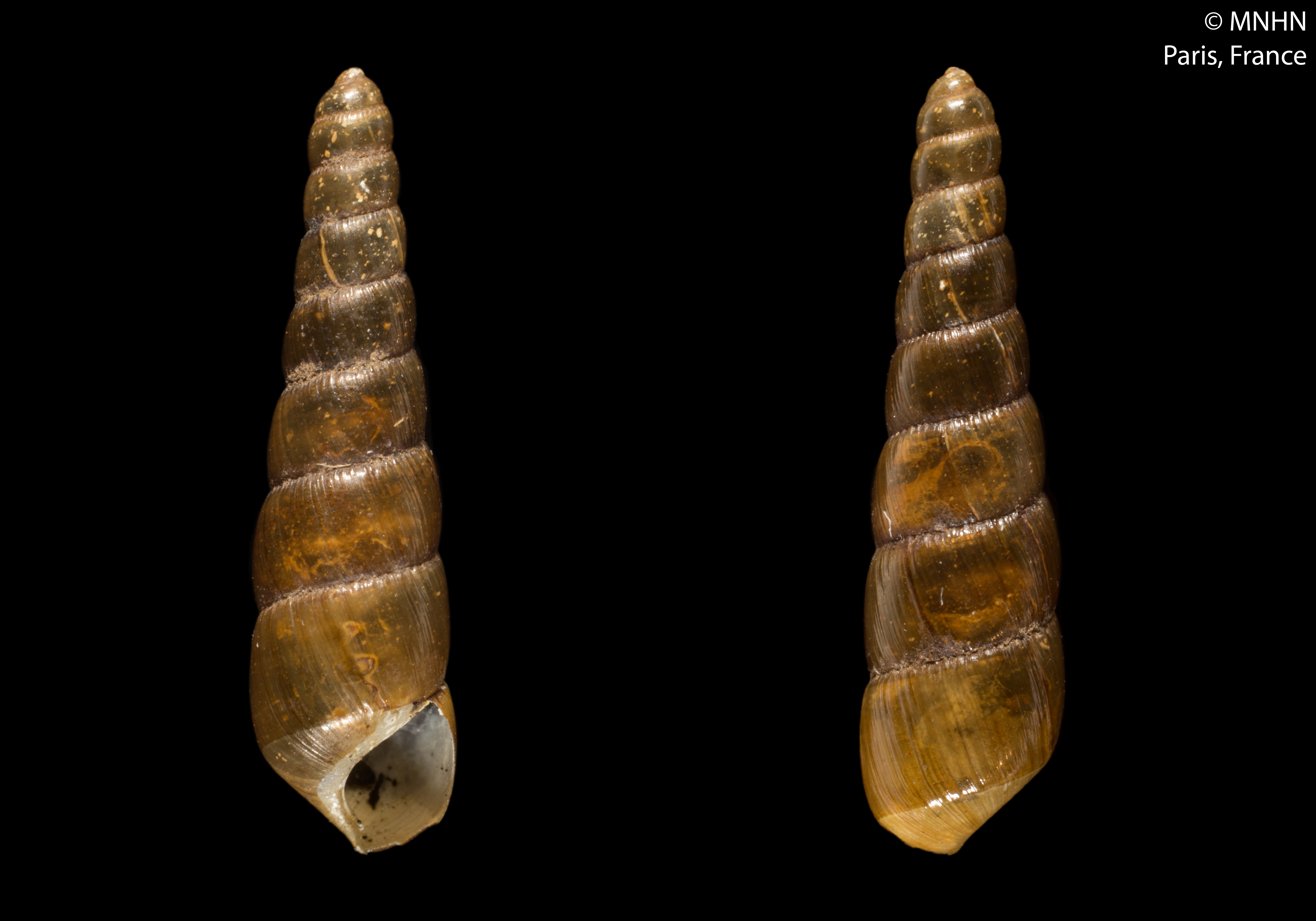
- Shell of Homorus nigellus (syntype at MNHN, Paris)

Scientific classification
- Kingdom: Animalia
- Phylum: Mollusca
- Class: Gastropoda
- Order: Stylommatophora
- Family: Achatinidae
- Genus: Homorus; Albers, 1850

Type species
- Achatina cyanostoma L. Pfeiffer, 1842

Synonyms
- Achatina (Homorus) Albers, 1850 (original rank)

= Homorus =

Extinct genus of gastropods

Homorus is a genus of air-breathing land snails, terrestrial pulmonate gastropod molluscs in the family Achatinidae.

== General characteristics ==
(Original description in Latin) The shell is thin. It is turretted, with a blunt apex. There are 9 whorls; the body whorl equals one-third of the total length. The columella is somewhat straight and is obliquely truncated. The aperture is oblong-oval. The lip is thin and is acute (sharp).

== Species ==
Species within the genus Homorus include:

- Homorus angustatus (Jickeli, 1873) (accepted > unreplaced junior homonym)
- Homorus antorinii (Morelet, 1872)
- Homorus arabicus (Connolly, 1941)
- Homorus cerinus Thiele, 1933
- Homorus conformis Thiele, 1933
- Homorus courteti Germain, 1907
- Homorus cyanostomus (L. Pfeiffer, 1842)
- Homorus dalbaensis Thiele, 1933
- Homorus discretus Thiele, 1933
- Homorus djimmaensis Thiele, 1933
- Homorus ellerbecki Kobelt, 1905
- Homorus erlangeri Kobelt, 1905
- Homorus fragilis Thiele, 1933
- Homorus garamulatae Kobelt, 1905
- Homorus ginirensis Kobelt, 1905
- Homorus kaffaensis Thiele, 1933
- Homorus laevis Thiele, 1933
- Homorus martensi (Dupuis & Putzeys, 1901)
- Homorus maurus Thiele, 1933
- Homorus megaspira (Mabille, 1884)
- Homorus meneleki (Preston, 1910)
- Homorus nebulosus (Morelet, 1883)
- Homorus nigellus (Morelet, 1867)
- Homorus nitens Thiele, 1933
- Homorus nympha (Preston, 1910)
- Homorus omeri Connolly, 1928
- Homorus opeas Pilsbry, 1905
- Homorus perrierianus (Bourguignat, 1883)
- Homorus pyramidellus (E. von Martens, 1892)
- Homorus ragazzii Pollonera, 1887
- Homorus splendens (Thiele, 1910)
- Homorus suaveolatus (Jickeli, 1873)
- Homorus subulatus (Jickeli, 1873)
- Homorus variabilis (Jickeli, 1873)
- Homorus vernicosus (Jickeli, 1873)
- Homorus vicinus (Preston, 1910)

Synonyms

- Homorus badius (E. von Martens, 1889): synonym of Subulona badia (E. von Martens, 1889)
- Homorus burnessi Connolly, 1923: synonym of Subulona burnessi (Connolly, 1923) (superseded combination, basionym
- Homorus foveolatus Preston, 1909: synonym of Homorus robinkempi Pilsbry, 1919
- Homorus massonianus Crosse, 1888: synonym of Petriola marmorea (Reeve, 1850)
- Homorus obesus Kobelt, 1905: synonym of Homorus erlangeri Kobelt, 1905
- Homorus perlucida Preston, 1910: synonym of Subulina perlucida (Preston, 1910) (original combination)
