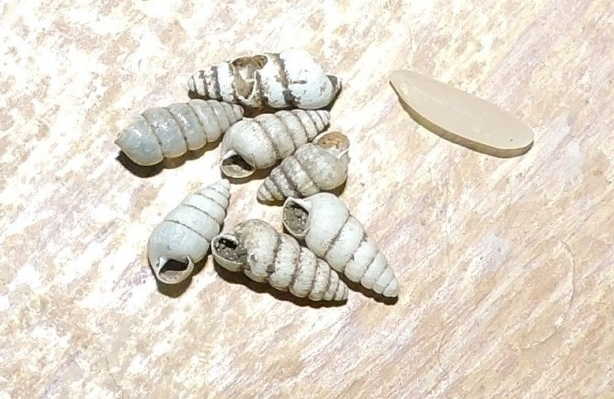
- Beckianum beckianum

Scientific classification
- Kingdom: Animalia
- Phylum: Mollusca
- Class: Gastropoda
- Order: Stylommatophora
- Family: Achatinidae
- Subfamily: Subulininae
- Genus: Beckianum; Baker, 1961

= Beckianum =

Genus of gastropods

Beckianum is a genus of air-breathing land snails, terrestrial pulmonate gastropod mollusks. This genus in the family Achatinidae.

== Species ==
Species within the genus Beckianum include:

- Beckianum beckianum (Pfeiffer, 1846)
- Beckianum sinistrum Martens, 1890
- Beckianum sp. - besides Beckianum beckianum and Beckianum sinistrum there seems to exist another species, endemic to Nicaragua
