= Zootecus =

Scientific classification
- Kingdom: Animalia
- Phylum: Mollusca
- Class: Gastropoda
- Order: Stylommatophora
- Family: Achatinidae
- Subfamily: Subulininae
- Genus: Zootecus; Westerlund, 1887

Genus of land snails

Zootecus is a genus of gastropods belonging to the family Achatinidae.

The species of this genus are found in Africa and Western Asia.

Species:

- Zootecus agrensis (Kurr, 1856)
- Zootecus chion (L.Pfeiffer, 1857)
- Zootecus contiguus (Reeve, 1849)
- Zootecus estellus (Benson, 1857)
- Zootecus insularis (Ehrenberg, 1831)
- Zootecus lucidissimus (Paladilhe, 1872)
- Zootecus pertica (Benson, 1857)
- Zootecus polygyratus (Reeve, 1849)
- Zootecus pullus (Gray, 1834)
