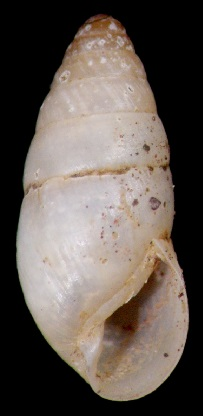
- Apertural view of a shell of Vegrandinia trindadensis

Scientific classification
- Kingdom: Animalia
- Phylum: Mollusca
- Class: Gastropoda
- Order: Stylommatophora
- Family: Achatinidae
- Subfamily: Subulininae
- Genus: Vegrandinia; Salvador, Cunha & Simone, 2013

Type species
- Vegrandinia trindadensis (Breure & Coelho, 1976)

Species
- Vegrandinia trindadensis

= Vegrandinia =

Genus of gastropods

Vegrandinia is a genus of medium-sized air-breathing land snails, terrestrial pulmonate gastropods in the family Achatinidae. The genus name refers to its small size.

The genus is known from one species that lives on Trindade Island in the state of Espírito Santo, Brazil. That species may already have become extinct due to the impact of introduced species on the island.

== Species ==
The only species in the genus is Vegrandinia trindadensis (Breure & Coelho, 1976).
