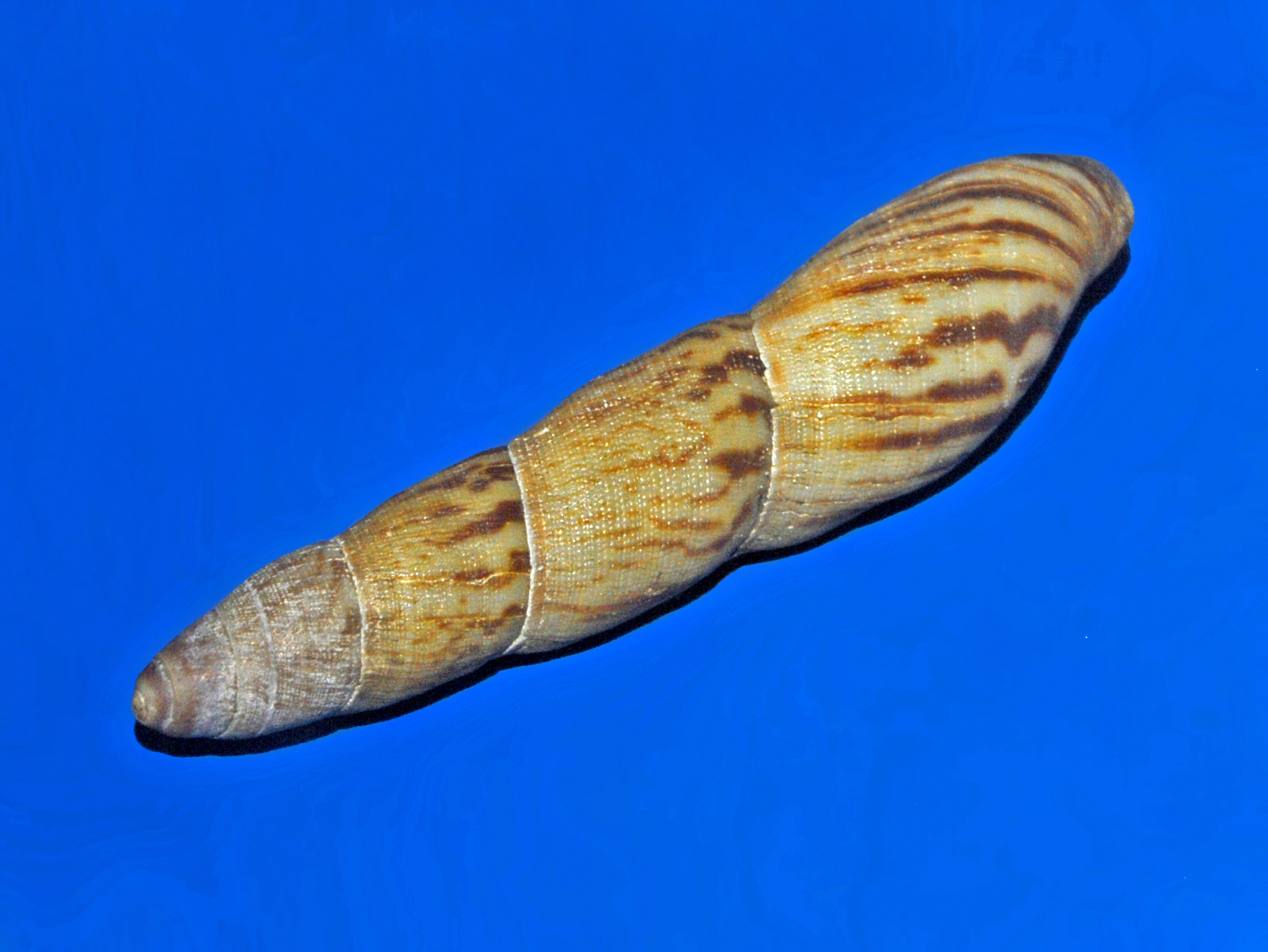
- Lateral view of a shell of Columna leai from São Tomé and Principe, on display at the Museo Civico di Storia Naturale di Milano

Scientific classification
- Kingdom: Animalia
- Phylum: Mollusca
- Class: Gastropoda
- Order: Stylommatophora
- Family: Achatinidae
- Genus: Columna; Perry, 1811

= Columna (gastropod) =

Genus of gastropods

Columna is a genus of air-breathing tropical land snails, terrestrial pulmonate gastropod mollusks in the family Achatinidae.

== Species ==
Species within the genus Columna include:

- Columna columna (O.F. Müller, 1774)
- Columna flammea von Martens
- Columna hainesi (Pfeiffer, 1852)
- Columna leai Tryon, 1866
