= Opeas =

Scientific classification
- Kingdom: Animalia
- Phylum: Mollusca
- Class: Gastropoda
- Order: Stylommatophora
- Family: Achatinidae
- Genus: Opeas; Albers, 1850

Genus of gastropods

C. Opeas didyma (Westerlund, 1883)

Opeas is a genus of small, tropical, air-breathing land snails, terrestrial pulmonate gastropod mollusks in the family Achatinidae.

Opeas is the type genus of the subfamily Opeatinae.

== Species ==
The genus Opeas includes the following species:

- Opeas bocourtianum bocourtianum Crosse & Fischer, 1869
- Opeas bocourtianum pittieri Martens, 1898
- Opeas clavulinum
- Opeas funiculare
- Opeas gracile
- Opeas guatemalense Strebel, 1882
- Opeas hannense (Rang, 1831)
- Opeas pumilum Pfeiffer, 1840
- Opeas pyrgula Schumacker & Boettger, 1891
- Opeas setchuanense
- Opeas striatissimum
- Opeas utriculus
