= Prosopeas =

Scientific classification
- Kingdom: Animalia
- Phylum: Mollusca
- Class: Gastropoda
- Order: Stylommatophora
- Family: Achatinidae
- Subfamily: Subulininae
- Genus: Prosopeas; Mörch, 1876

Genus of land snails

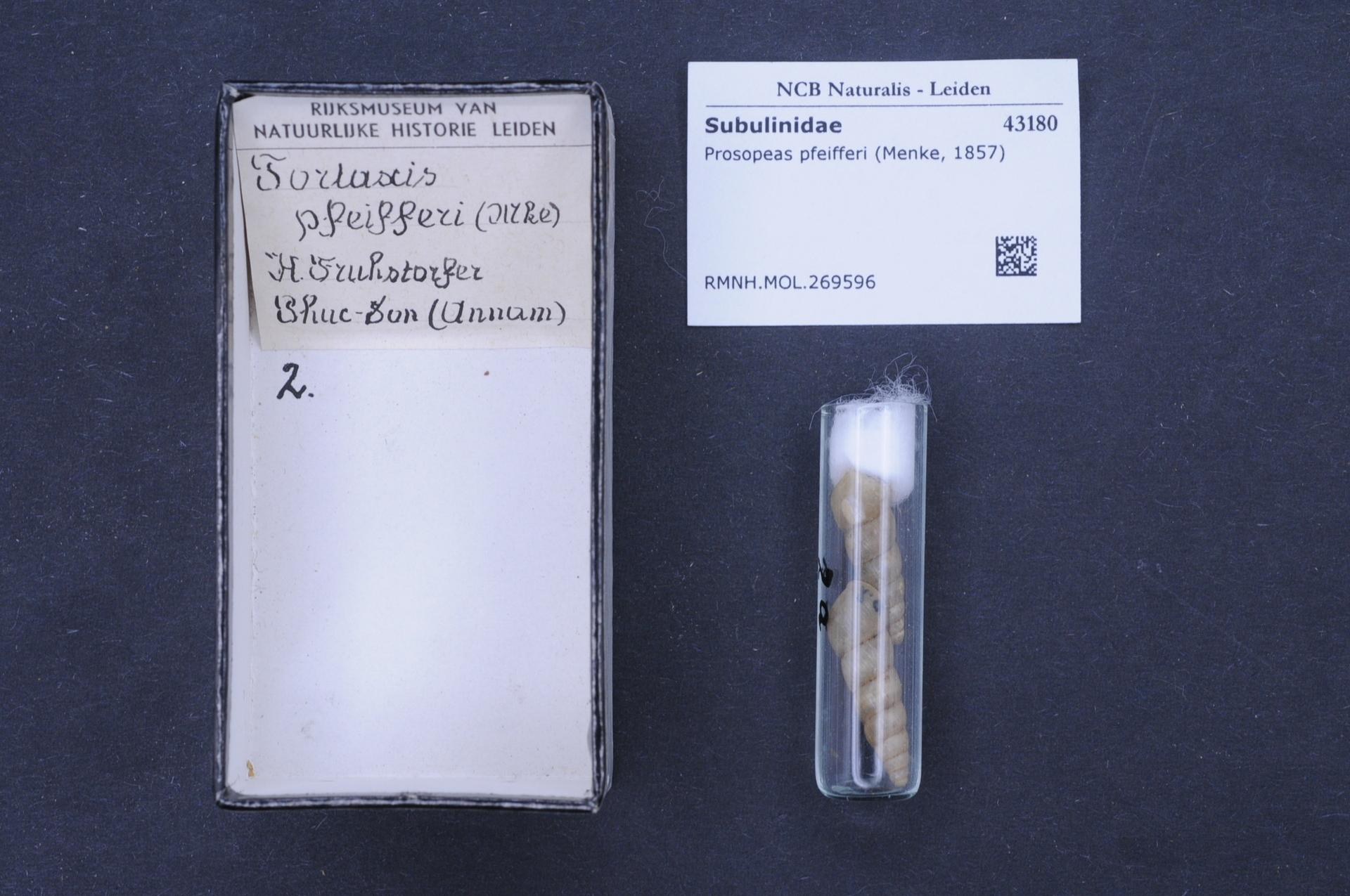
Prosopeas pfeifferi

Prosopeas is a genus of gastropods belonging to the family Achatinidae.

The species of this genus are found in Eastern Asia.

Species:

- Prosopeas achates (Mörch, 1875)
- Prosopeas anceyi Pilsbry, 1906
- Prosopeas argentea J.B.Henderson, 1898
- Prosopeas carolinum (Martens, 1880)
- Prosopeas cochliodes (L.Pfeiffer, 1843)
- Prosopeas discernibile (E.von Martens, 1896)
- Prosopeas elberti Haas, 1912
- Prosopeas elongatulum (L.Pfeiffer, 1846)
- Prosopeas excellens Bavay & Dautzenberg, 1909
- Prosopeas fagoti (Mabille, 1887)
- Prosopeas hastatum Möllendorff, 1897
- Prosopeas haughtoni (Benson, 1863)
- Prosopeas hebes (W.T.Blanford & H.F.Blanford, 1861)
- Prosopeas henrici (Ancey, 1898)
- Prosopeas holosericum Möllendorff, 1897
- Prosopeas huberi Thach, 2018
- Prosopeas lavillei Dautzenberg & H.Fischer, 1908
- Prosopeas laxispirum (Martens, 1867)
- Prosopeas lombockense (E.A.Smith, 1898)
- Prosopeas macilentum (Reeve, 1848)
- Prosopeas muongbuense Do, 2014
- Prosopeas pagoda (C.Semper, 1874)
- Prosopeas pealei (Tryon, 1869)
- Prosopeas pfeifferi (Menke, 1857)
- Prosopeas quadrasi (Hidalgo, 1888)
- Prosopeas rhodinaeforme Möllendorff, 1894
- Prosopeas roepstorfi (Mörch, 1876)
- Prosopeas romblonicum Möllendorff, 1896
- Prosopeas suturale Möllendorff, 1890
- Prosopeas turricula (Martens, 1860)
- Prosopeas ventrosulum Bavay & Dautzenberg, 1909
- Prosopeas walkeri (Benson, 1863)
