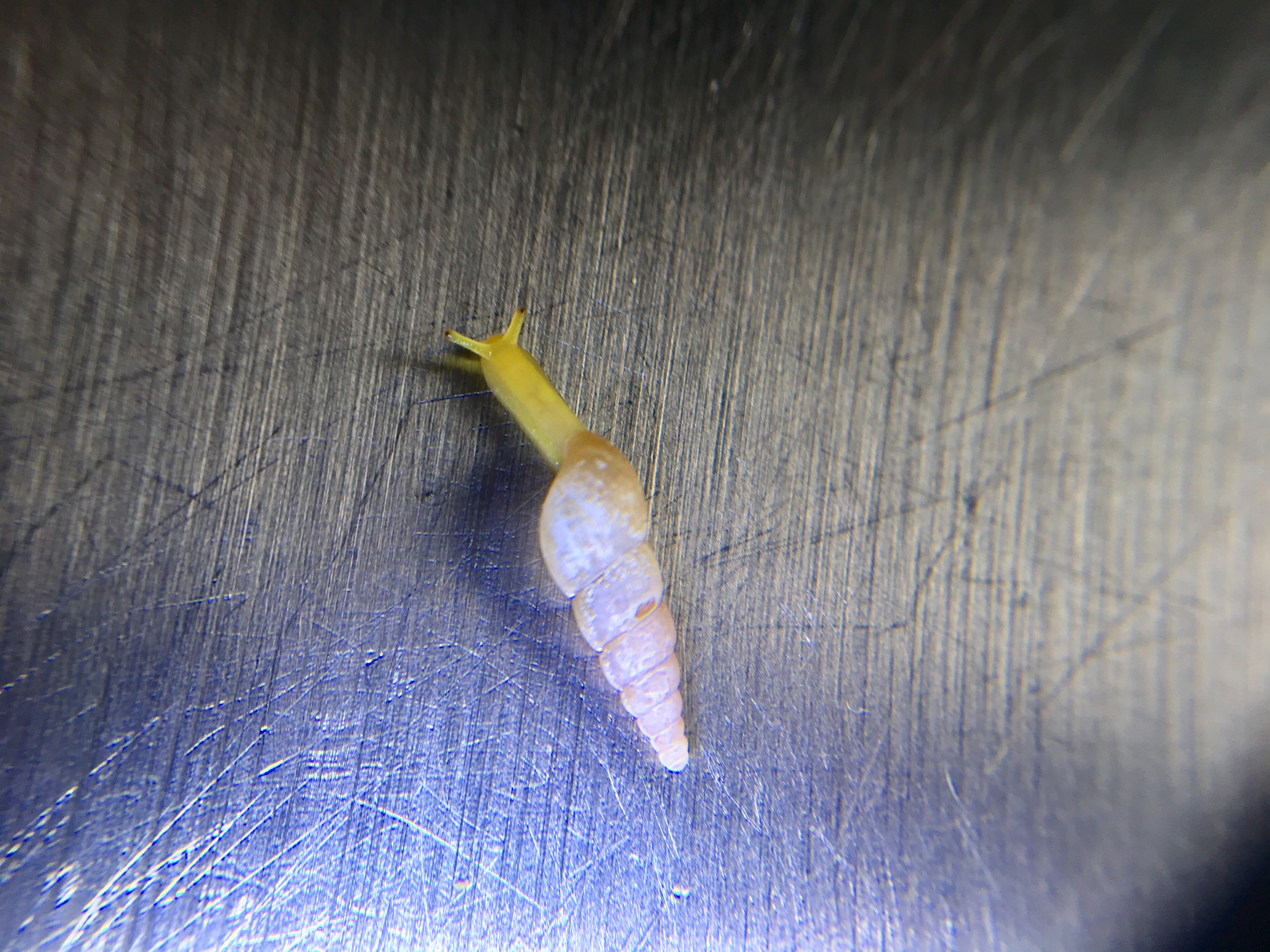
- Adult Allopeas gracile

Scientific classification
- Kingdom: Animalia
- Phylum: Mollusca
- Class: Gastropoda
- Order: Stylommatophora
- Family: Achatinidae
- Subfamily: Subulininae; P. Fischer & Crosse, 1877

Genera
- See text

= Subulininae =

Subulininae Temporal range: Lower Paleocene–Recent

Subfamily of gastropods

Subulininae is a subfamily of small tropical air-breathing land snails, terrestrial pulmonate gastropod mollusks in the family Achatinidae.

== Taxonomy ==
The taxonomy of the Subulinnae remains a source of discussion. It has been raised to the level of family under the name Achatinacea ((Fischer and Crosse 1877; Thiele 1931: 549), later followed by Zilch (1959) and Vaught (1989). This systematic classification was later revealed as polyphyletic (Fontanilla et al. 2017). Molluscabase still considers it as a subfamily of Achatinidae.

== Distribution ==
Worldwide.

== Anatomy ==
In this subfamily, the number of haploid chromosomes lies between 26 and 35.

== Genera ==
Genera in the subfamily Subulininae include:

- Allopeas H. B. Baker, 1935
- Beckianum Baker, 1961
- Curvella Chaper, 1885
- Dysopeas Baker, 1927
- Euonyma Melvill & Ponsonby, 1896
- Hypolysia Melvill & Ponsonby, 1901
- Lamellaxis Strebel & Pfeffer, 1882
- Leptinaria Beck, 1837
- Leptopeas Baker, 1927
- Micropeas Connolly, 1923
- Neoglessula Pilsbry, 1909
- Opeas Albers, 1850
- Paropeas Pilsbry, 1906
- Pelatrinia Pilsbry, 1907
- Prosopeas Mörch, 1876
- Pseudarinia Yen, 1952
- Pseudoglessula Boettger, 1892
- Pseudopeas Putzeys, 1899
- Striosubulina Thiele, 1933
- Subulina Beck, 1837 - type genus of the subfamily Subulininae
- Vegrandinia Salvador, Cunha & Simone, 2013
- Zootecus Westerlund, 1887
