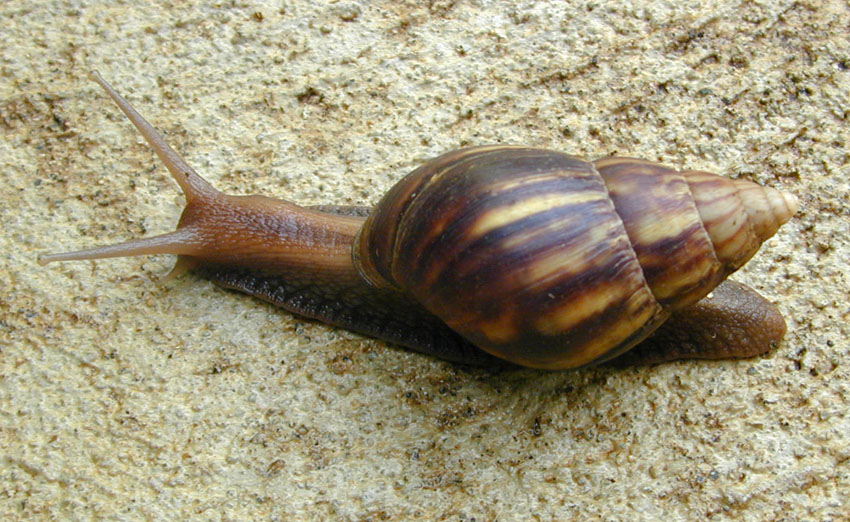
- Giant East African Snail, Achatina fulica

Scientific classification
- Kingdom: Animalia
- Phylum: Mollusca
- Class: Gastropoda
- Order: Stylommatophora
- Suborder: Achatinina
- Superfamily: Achatinoidea; Swainson, 1840

Families
- Achatinidae; Aillyidae; Ferussaciidae; Micractaeonidae

= Achatinoidea =

Superfamily of gastropods

The Achatinoidea are a superfamily of air-breathing land snails and slugs, terrestrial gastropod mollusks in the suborder Achatinina.

== 2005 taxonomy ==
According to taxonomy of the Gastropoda by Bouchet & Rocroi, 2005 there are four families within the superfamily Achatinoidea, that is based on the study by Nordsieck, published in 1986.

- Family Achatinidae Swainson, 1840
- Family Ferussaciidae Bourguignat, 1883
- Family Micractaeonidae Schileyko, 1999
- Family Subulinidae P. Fischer & Crosse, 1877

== 2017 taxonomy ==
Fontanilla et al. recognized Subulinidae as not monophyletic in 2017 and they classified Subulininae within Achatinidae. This is also the taxonomy followed in the MolluscaBase/World Register of Marine Species (WoRMS):

- Family Achatinidae Swainson, 1840
- Family Aillyidae H. B. Baker, 1955
- Family Ferussaciidae Bourguignat, 1883
- Family Micractaeonidae Schileyko, 1999
