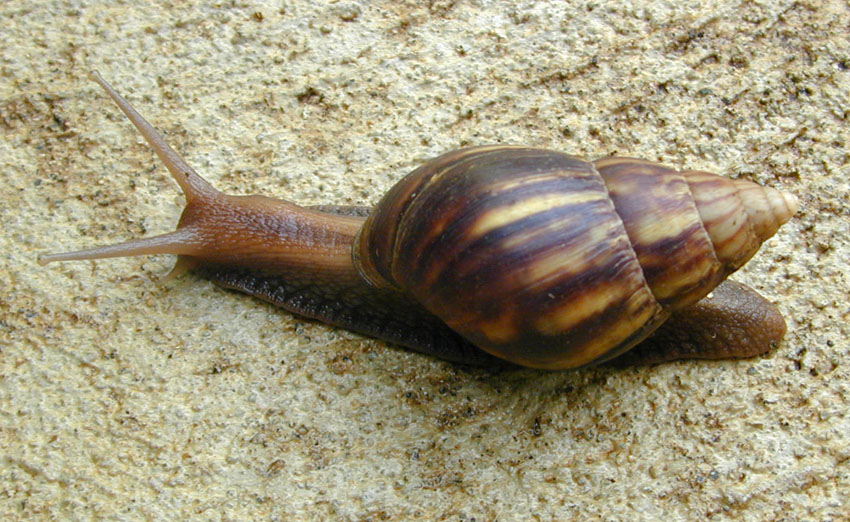
- Giant African land snail, Lissachatina fulica

Scientific classification
- Kingdom: Animalia
- Phylum: Mollusca
- Class: Gastropoda
- Order: Stylommatophora
- Superfamily: Achatinoidea
- Family: Achatinidae; Swainson, 1840

= Achatinidae =

Achatinidae Temporal range: Eocene–Recent

Family of gastropods

Achatinidae (New Latin, from Greek "agate") is a family of medium to large sized tropical land snails, terrestrial pulmonate gastropod mollusks from Africa.

Well known species include Achatina achatina the Giant African Snail, and Lissachatina fulica the Giant East African Snail.

As of 2022, there were 105 genera recognized within the family Achatinidae.

== Description ==
In this family, the number of haploid chromosomes lies between 26 and 30 (according to the values in this table).

== Distribution ==
The native distribution of Achatinidae is Africa south of the Sahara.

== Taxonomy ==
As of 2022, the family Achatinidae contains the following subfamilies:

- Achatininae Swainson, 1840 – synonyms: Urceidae Chaper, 1884; Ampullidae Winckworth, 1945
- Coeliaxinae Pilsbry, 1907
- Cryptelasminae Germain, 1916
- Glessulinae Godwin-Austin, 1920
- Opeatinae Thiele, 1931
- Petriolinae Schileyko, 1999
- Pyrgininae Germain, 1916
- Rishetiinae Schileyko, 1999
- Rumininae Wenz, 1923
- Stenogyrinae P. Fischer & Crosse, 1877
- Subulininae P. Fischer & Crosse, 1877
- Thyrophorellinae Girard, 1895

=== Genera ===
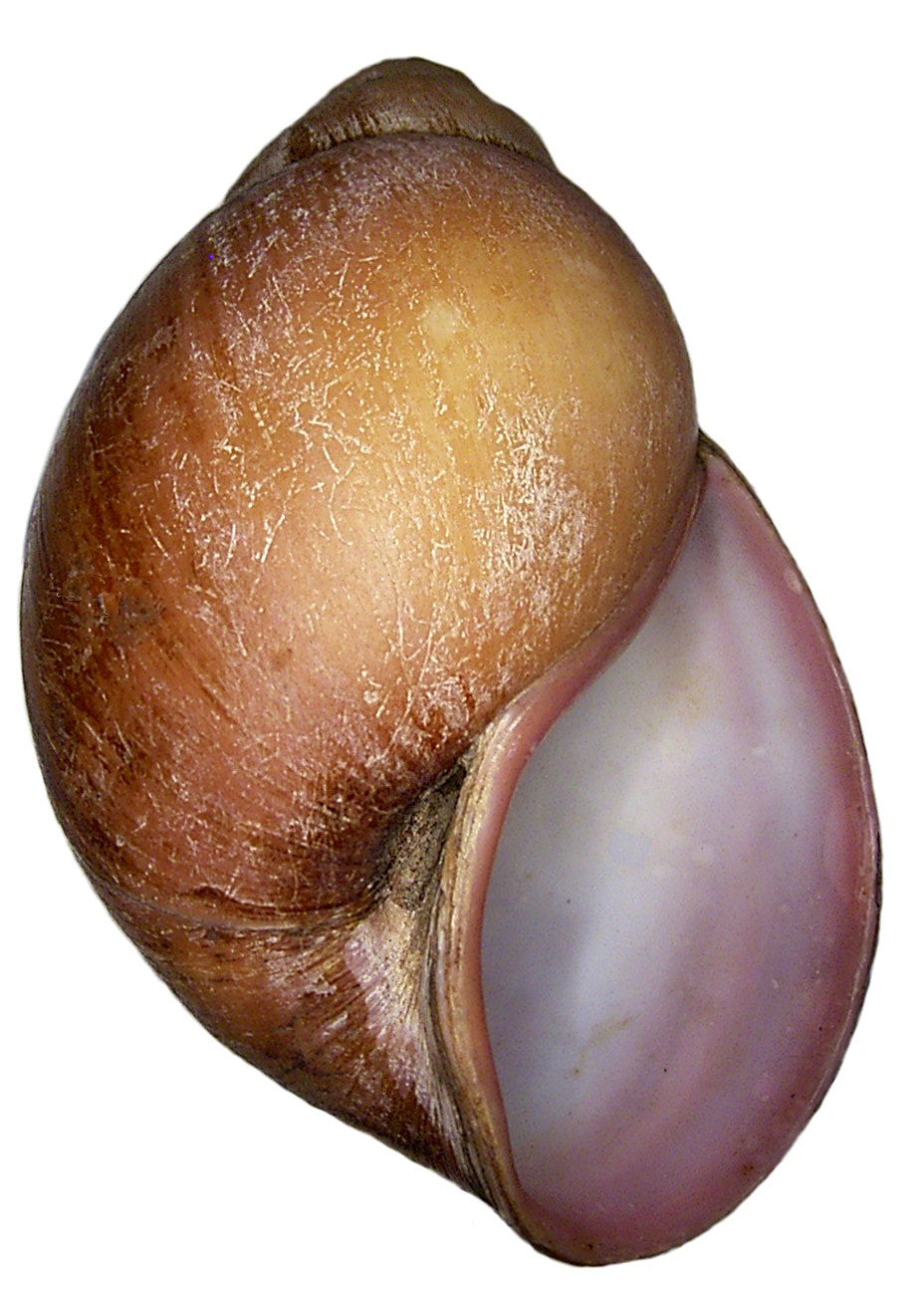
Burtoa nilotica shell

The following genera are recognised in the family Achatinidae:

Achatininae

- Achatina Lamarck, 1799 – type genus of the family Achatinidae
- Archachatina Albers, 1850
- Atopocochlis Crosse & P. Fischer, 1888
- Bequaertina Mead, 1994
- Brownisca Mead, 2004
- Bruggenina Mead, 2004
- Burtoa Bourguignat, 1889
- Callistoplepa Ancey, 1888
- Cochlitoma Férussac, 1821
- Columna Perry, 1811
- Leptocala Ancey, 1888
- Leptocalina Bequaert, 1950
- Leptocallista Pilsbry, 1904
- Lignus Gray, 1834
- Limicolaria Schumacher, 1817
- Limicolariopsis d'Ailly, 1910
- Lissachatina Bequaert, 1950
- Metachatina Pilsbry, 1904
- Pseudachatina Albers, 1850

Coeliaxinae

- Balfouria Crosse, 1884
- Coeliaxis H. Adams & Angas, 1865
- Ischnocion Pilsbry, 1907
- Nannobeliscus Weyrauch, 1967
- Neosubulina Smith, 1898
- Riebeckia von Martens, 1883

Cryptelasminae

- Cryptelasmus Pilsbry, 1907
- Thomea Girard, 1893

Glessulinae

- Glessula Martens, 1860

Opeatinae

- Eremopeas Pilsbry, 1906
- Opeas Albers, 1850

Petriolinae

- Aporachis D. T. Holyoak, 2020
- Bocageia Girard, 1893
- Ceras Dupuis & Putzeys, 1901
- Chilonopsis Fischer de Waldheim, 1848
- Cleostyla Dall, 1896
- Comoropeas Pilsbry, 1906
- Dictyoglessula Pilsbry, 1919
- Homorus Albers, 1850
- Ischnoglessula Pilsbry, 1919
- Itiopiana Preston, 1910
- Kempioconcha Preston, 1913
- Liobocageia Pilsbry, 1919
- Mabilliella Ancey, 1886
- Nothapalinus Connolly, 1923
- Nothapalus von Martens, 1897
- Oleata Ortiz de Zarate, 1959
- Oreohomorus Pilsbry, 1919
- Petriola Dall, 1905
- Subuliniscus Pilsbry, 1919
- Subulona Martens, 1889

Pyrgininae

- Pseudobalea Shuttleworth, 1854
- Pyrgina Greef, 1882

Rishetiinae

- Bacillum Theobald, 1840
- Eutomopeas Pilsbry, 1946
- Rishetia Godwin-Austen, 1920
- Tortaxis Pilsbry, 1906

Rumininae

- Krapfiella Preston, 1911
- Lubricetta Haas, 1928
- Namibiella Zilch, 1954
- Rumina Risso, 1826
- Xerocerastus Kobelt & Möllendorff, 1902

Stenogyrinae

- Chryserpes Pilsbry, 1906
- Cupulella Aguayo & Jaume, 1948
- †Cylindrogyra Repelin, 1902
- Dolicholestes Pilsbry, 1906
- Lyobasis Pilsbry, 1903
- Neobeliscus Pilsbry, 1896
- †Nisopsis Matheron, 1888
- Obeliscus Beck, 1837
- Ochroderma Ancey, 1885
- Ochrodermatina Thiele, 1931
- Ochrodermella Pilsbry, 1907
- Plicaxis Sykes, 1903
- Promoussonius Pilsbry, 1906
- Protobeliscus Pilsbry, 1906
- Rhodea Adams & Adams, 1855
- Stenogyra Shuttleworth, 1854
- Synapterpes Pilsbry, 1896
- Zoniferella Pilsbry, 1906

Subulininae

- Allopeas H. B. Baker, 1935
- Beckianum Baker, 1961
- Curvella Chaper, 1885
- Dysopeas Baker, 1927
- Euonyma Melvill & Ponsonby, 1896
- Fortuna Schlickum & Strauch, 1972
- Hypolysia Melvill & Ponsonby, 1901
- Lamellaxis Strebel & Pfeffer, 1882
- Lavajatus Simone, 2018
- Leptinaria Beck, 1837
- Leptopeas Baker, 1927
- Micropeas Connolly, 1923
- Neoglessula Pilsbry, 1909
- †Opetiopsis S.-Y. Guo, 1983
- Paropeas Pilsbry, 1906
- Pelatrinia Pilsbry, 1907
- Prosopeas Mörch, 1876
- Pseudoglessula Boettger, 1892
- Pseudopeas Putzeys, 1899
- Striosubulina Thiele, 1933
- Subulina Beck, 1837
- Vegrandinia Salvador, Cunha & Simone, 2013
- Zootecus Westerlund, 1887

Thyrophorellinae

- Thyrophorella Greeff, 1882

Other subfamilies

- †Arabicolaria Harzhauser & Neubauer, 2016
- †Pacaudiella Harzhauser & Neubauer, 2016
