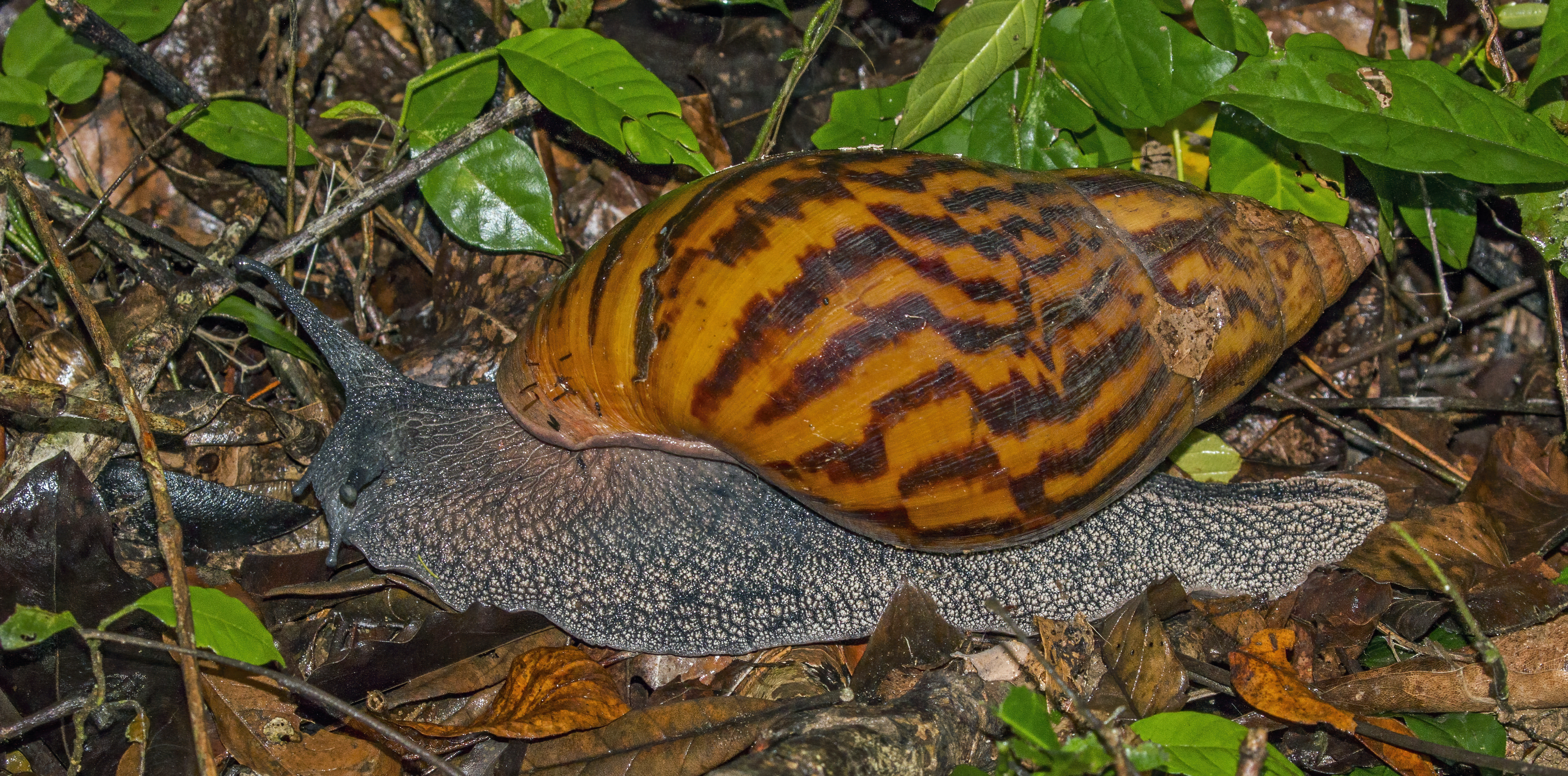
- Achatina achatina, Kakum National Park, Ghana

Scientific classification
- Kingdom: Animalia
- Phylum: Mollusca
- Class: Gastropoda
- Order: Stylommatophora
- Family: Achatinidae
- Subfamily: Achatininae
- Genus: Achatina; Lamarck, 1799

Type species
- Bulla achatina Linnaeus, 1758

Synonyms
- Achatina (Achatina) Lamarck, 1799 · alternate representation; Achatina (Pintoa) Bourguignat, 1890 · alternate representation; Achatina (Tripachatina) Bourguignat, 1890 · alternate representation; Achatinus Montfort, 1810; Achatium Link, 1807; Agathina J. Férussac, 1807; Agatina auct. (incorrect subsequent spelling); Bulimus (Achatina) Lamarck, 1799 ·; Euachatina Shuttleworth, 1856; Geodes Gistel, 1848; Glandina (Achatina) Lamarck, 1799 (considered a separate genus); Oncaea Gistel, 1848; Parachatina Bourguignat, 1889; Serpaea Bourguignat, 1889; Tripachatina Bourguignat, 1890 ·; Urceus Mörch, 1857

= Achatina =

Genus of gastropods

Achatina is a genus of medium-sized to very large, air-breathing, tropical land snails, terrestrial pulmonate gastropod mollusks in the family Achatinidae.

== Distribution ==
There are some 200 species of Achatinidae in Sub-Saharan Africa. Some species are kept as terrarium animals due to their large size (3 inches/ over 7.5 centimeters), and colourful shells.

== Shell description ==
Snails in this genus have medium to large shells which are ovate in shape and often colourfully streaked.

== Species ==
Species within the genus Achatina include:

- Achatina achatina Linnaeus, 1758 or giant African snail, agate snail or Ghana tiger snail, from Western Africa (Liberia through Nigeria) grows to be the largest land snail on Earth.
- Achatina ampullacea Böttger, 1910
- Achatina balteata Reeve, 1849 - Cameroon to Central Angola.
- Achatina bandeirana Morelet, 1866
- Achatina bayaona Morelet, 1866
- Achatina bayoli Morelet, 1888
- Achatina bisculpta E. A. Smith, 1878
- Achatina connollyi Preston, 1912
- Achatina coroca Bruggen, 1978
- Achatina craveni E. A. Smith, 1881 - Congo, Tanzania.
- Achatina dammarensis L. Pfeiffer, 1870 - Botswana
- Achatina dohrniana L. Pfeiffer, 1870
- Achatina greyi Da Costa, 1907
- Achatina hortensiae Morelet, 1866
- Achatina inaequalis L. Pfeiffer, 1855
- Achatina iostoma L. Pfeiffer, 1854 - Cameroon
- Achatina morrelli Preston, 1905
- Achatina obscura Da Costa, 1907
- Achatina osborni Pilsbry, 1919
- Achatina passargei von Martens, 1900
- Achatina perfecta Morelet, 1867
- Achatina pfeifferi Dunker, 1845
- Achatina polychroa Morelet, 1866
- Achatina randabeli Bourguignat, 1889
- Achatina rugosa Putzeys, 1898
- Achatina schinziana Mousson, 1888 - Botswana
- Achatina schweinfurthi von Martens, 1873 - East Africa.
- Achatina semisculpta Dunker, 1845 - East Africa
- Achatina smithii Craven, 1881
- Achatina spekei Dohrn, 1864
- Achatina stuhlmanni von Martens, 1892 - Uganda.
- Achatina tavaresiana Morelet, 1866 - Angola
- Achatina tincta Reeve, 1842 - Congo, Angola
- Achatina tracheia Connolly, 1929 - Southeast Africa
- Achatina transparens Da Costa, 1907
- Achatina vignoniana Morelet, 1874
- Achatina virgulata Da Costa, 1907
- Achatina welwitschi Morelet, 1866
- Achatina weynsi Dautzenberg, 1891 - Congo

incertae sedis:

- Achatina vassei Germain, 1918 - The internal anatomy of this species is not known, and therefore the generic classification of ‘Achatina’ vassei cannot be made.

== Species brought into synonymy ==
- Achatina albopicta E. A. Smith, 1878 - along the coast of Kenya and Tanzania: synonym of Lissachatina albopicta (E. A. Smith, 1878)
- Achatina allisa Reeve, 1849: synonym of Lissachatina allisa (L. Reeve, 1849)
- Achatina antourtourensis Crosse, 1879 : synonym of Achatina immaculata Lamarck, 1822: synonym of Lissachatina immaculata (Lamarck, 1822) (junior synonym)
- Achatina arctespirata Bourguignat, 1890: synonym of Achatina randabeli Bourguignat, 1890
- Achatina barbigera Morelet, 1866: synonym of Petriola marmorea (Reeve, 1850)
- Achatina bloyeti Bourguignat, 1890: synonym of Lissachatina bloyeti (Bourguignat, 1890)
- Achatina capelloi Furtado, 1886: synonym of Lissachatina capelloi (Furtado, 1886)
- Achatina fulgurata Pfeiffer, 1853 - Senegal: synonym of Achatina eleanorae Mead, 1995
- Achatina drakensbergensis Melvill & Ponsonby, 1897 : synonym of Cochlitoma drakensbergensis (Melvill & Ponsonby, 1897)
- Achatina eleanorae Mead, 1995: synonym of Lissachatina eleanorae (Mead, 1995)
- Achatina ellioti E. A. Smith, 1895: synonym of Oreohomorus ellioti (E. A. Smith, 1895)
- Achatina fulica Bowdich, 1822 or giant East African snail from Eastern Africa is a serious pest in the many tropical countries where it has been introduced, and is listed as an invasive species by some governments: synonym of Lissachatina fulica (Bowdich, 1822)
- Achatina glaucina E. A. Smith, 1899: synonym of Lissachatina glaucina (E. A. Smith, 1899)
- Achatina glutinosa Pfeiffer, 1854 - Mozambique: synonym of Lissachatina glutinosa (L. Pfeiffer, 1854)
- Achatina gruveli Dautzenberg, 1921: synonym of Achatina iostoma L. Pfeiffer, 1854
- Achatina gundlachi L. Pfeiffer, 1850: synonym of Geostilbia gundlachi (L. Pfeiffer, 1850)
- Achatina hamillei Petit de la Saussaye, 1859: synonym of Lissachatina fulica hamillei (Petit de la Saussaye, 1859)
- Achatina immaculata Lamarck, 1822 - Southeastern Africa: synonym of Lissachatina immaculata (Lamarck, 1822)
- Achatina iredalei Preston, 1910: synonym of Lissachatina allisa (Reeve, 1849)
- Achatina ivensi Furtado, 1886: synonym of Achatina pfeifferi Dunker, 1845
- Achatina johnstoni E. A. Smith, 1899: synonym of Lissachatina johnstoni (E. A. Smith, 1899)
- Achatina kilimae Dautzenberg, 1908: synonym of Lissachatina kilimae (Dautzenberg, 1908)
- Achatina lowei Paiva, 1866: synonym of Amphorella oryza (R. T. Lowe, 1852)
- Achatina lechaptoisi Ancey, 1894: synonym of Lissachatina immaculata (Lamarck, 1822)
- Achatina letourneuxi Bourguignat, 1879: synonym of Lissachatina fulica hamillei (Petit de la Saussaye, 1859)
- Achatina lhotellerii Bourguignat, 1879: synonym of Lissachatina zanzibarica (Bourguignat, 1879)
- Achatina marginata Swainson, 1821: synonym of Archachatina marginata (Swainson, 1821)
- Achatina milneedwardsiana Revoil, 1885: synonym of Lissachatina fulica hamillei (Petit de la Saussaye, 1859)
- Achatina minima Siemaschko, 1847: synonym of Cochlicopa lubricella (Porro, 1838)
- Achatina monochromatica Pilsbry (Deprecated. Old historical synonym of Achatina achatina var. monochromatic)
- Achatina moreletiana Deshayes, 1851: taxon inquirendum
- Achatina mulanjensis Crowley & Pain - Malawi: synonym of Achatina immaculata Lamarck, 1822 (junior synonym)
- Achatina nigella Morelet, 1867: synonym of Homorus nigellus (Morelet, 1867)
- Achatina nyikaensis Pilsbry, 1909 - Malawi: synonym of Bequaertina pintoi (Bourguignat, 1889) (junior synonym)
- Achatina panthera Férussac, 1832 - Zimbabwe, Mauritius: synonym of Achatina immaculata Lamarck, 1822
- Achatina pellucida L. Pfeiffer, 1840: synonym of Blauneria heteroclita (Montagu, 1808)
- Achatina purpurea (Gmelin, 1790): synonym of Archachatina purpurea (Gmelin, 1790)
- Achatina raffrayi Jousseaume, 1883: synonym of Leptocallista raffrayi (Jousseaume, 1883)
- Achatina rediviva Mabille, 1901: synonym of Lissachatina fulica (Bowdich, 1822)
- Achatina reticulata Pfeiffer, 1845 - Zanzibar: synonym of Lissachatina reticulata (L. Pfeiffer, 1845)
- Achatina semitarum L. Pfeiffer, 1842: synonym of Laevaricella semitarum (L. Pfeiffer, 1842)
- Achatina sylvatica Putzeys, 1898 - Congo: synonym of Leptocalina putzeysi (Dautzenberg & Germain, 1914)
- Achatina varicosa Pfeiffer, 1845 - South Africa: synonym of Cochlitoma varicosa (L. Pfeiffer, 1861)
- Achatina variegata Lamarck, 1801: synonym of Achatina achatina (Linnaeus, 1758)
- Achatina variegata var. minima Germain, 1912: synonym of Achatina achatina elegans (Link, 1807)
- Achatina wildemani Dautzenberg, 1907: synonym of Leptocalina specularis (Morelet, 1866)
- Achatina yalaensis Germain, 1936: synonym of Oreohomorus connollyi (Odhner, 1932)
- Achatina zanzibarica Bourguignat, 1879 - Tanzania: synonym of Lissachatina zanzibarica (Bourguignat, 1879)
- Achatina zebra Bruguiere, 1792 - South Africa: synonym of Cochlitoma zebra (Bruguière, 1792)
