= List of non-marine molluscs of the Democratic Republic of the Congo =

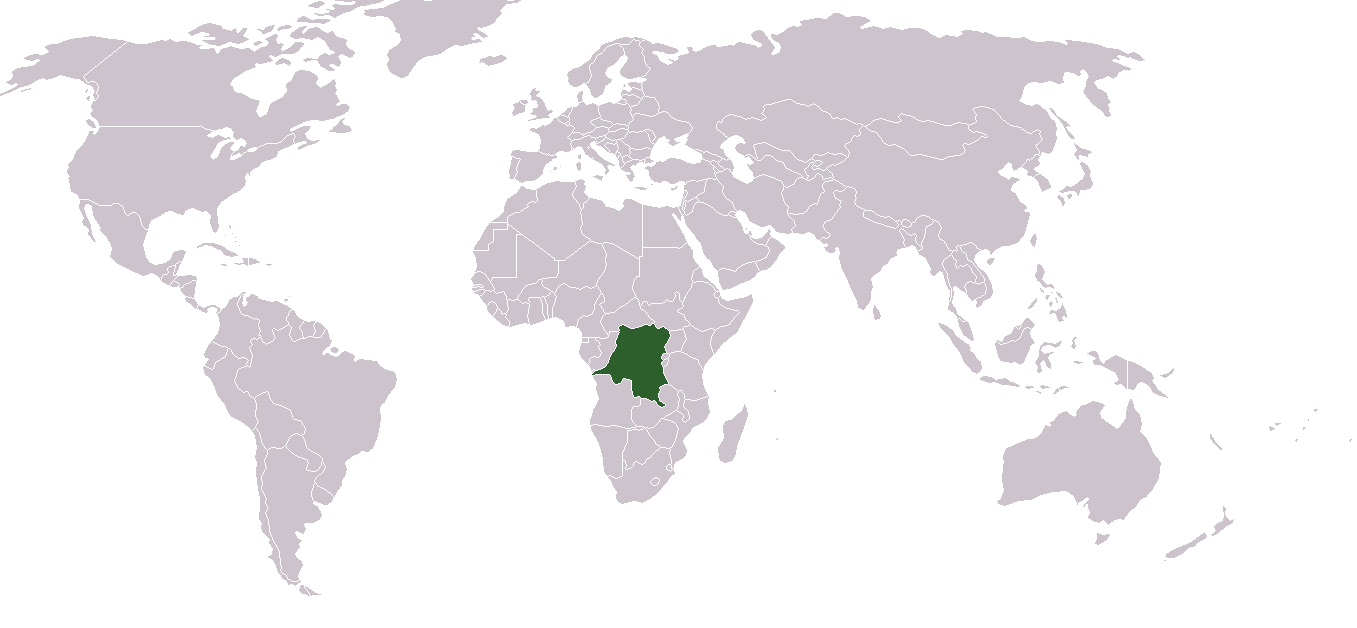
Location of the Democratic Republic of the Congo

The non-marine molluscs of the Democratic Republic of the Congo are a part of the molluscan fauna of the Democratic Republic of the Congo (wildlife of the Democratic Republic of the Congo).

A number of species of non-marine molluscs are found in the wild in the Democratic Republic of the Congo.

== Freshwater gastropods ==
Ampullariidae

- Pila ovata (Olivier, 1804)

Bithyniidae

- Gabbiella humerosa (Martens, 1879)

Pachychilidae

- Potadoma ignobilis (Thiele, 1911)
- Potadoma liricincta (Smith, 1888)

Thiaridae

- Melanoides tuberculata (O. F. Müller, 1774)

Lymnaeidae

- Lymnaea natalensis Krauss, 1848

Planorbidae

- Biomphalaria pfeifferi (Krauss, 1848)
- Biomphalaria smithi Preston, 1910
- Biomphalaria stanleyi (Smith, 1888)
- Bulinus forskalii (Ehrenberg, 1831)
- Bulinus truncatus (Audouin, 1827)
- Ceratophallus kigeziensis (Preston, 1912)

== Land gastropods ==
Cyclophoridae

- Cyathopoma straeleni Adam, 1987

Vertiginidae

- Nesopupa griqualandica musepagii Adam, 1954
- Nesopupa kanongae Adam, 1954
- Nesopupa pelengeae Adam, 1954
- Truncatellina obesa Adam, 1954

Streptaxidae

- Gulella albinus van Bruggen & van Goethem, 1999
- Gulella coarti (Dautzenberg & Germain, 1914)
- Gullela pupa ituriensis Pilsbry, 1919
- Gulella turriformis van Bruggen & van Goethem, 1999
- Ptychotrema conicum Adam & van Goethem, 1978
- Ptychotrema dubium Adam & van Goethem, 1978
- Ptychotrema ganzae Adam & van Goethem, 1978
- Ptychotrema goossensi Adam & van Goethem, 1978
- Ptychotrema hifirae Adam & van Goethem, 1978
- Ptychotrema jacquelinae Adam & van Goethem, 1978
- Ptychotrema kazibae Adam & van Goethem, 1978
- Ptychotrema kibarae Adam & van Goethem, 1978
- Ptychotrema pelengeense Adam & van Goethem, 1978
- Ptychotrema pseudomukulense Adam & van Goethem, 1978
- Ptychotrema upembae Adam, van Bruggen & van Goethem, 1993
- Ptychotrema wittei Adam & van Goethem, 1978
- Tayloria moncieuxi Haas, 1934

Gymnarionidae

- Gymnarion aloysii-sabaudiae (Pollonera, 1906)
- Gymnarion apertus Binder, 1979
- Gymnarion bequaerti Binder, 1979
- Gymnarion cf. apertus Binder, 1979
- Gymnarion chinegris Binder, 1979
- Gymnarion upembae Binder, 1979
- Gymnarion wittei Binder, 1979

Achatinidae

- Achatina achatina Linnaeus, 1758
- Achatina fulica Bowdich, 1822
- Achatina osborni Pilsbry, 1919
- Achatina tincta Reeve, 1842
- Burtoa nilotica emini Martens, 1895
- Burtoa nilotica obliqua (E. von Martens, 1895)
- Homorus amputatus Pilsbry, 1919
- Limicolaria distincta Putzeys, 1898
- Limicolaria laeta medjensis Pilsbry, 1919
- Perideriopsis fallsensis Dupuis & Putzeys, 1900
- Subuliniscus ruwenzorensis (Pollonera, )

Arionidae

- Arion rufus (Linnaeus, 1758)

Cerastidae

- Cerastua upembae (van Goethem & Adam, 1978)
- Cerastus bequaerti Pilsbry, 1919
- Pachnodus rutshuruensis Pilsbry, 1919

Subulinidae

- Curvella bathytoma Pilsbry, 1919
- Nothapalus paucispira xanthophaes (Pilsbry,
- Pseudoglessula walikalensis Pilsbry, 1919

Limacidae

- Lehmannia valentiana (Férussac, 1822)

Veronicellidae

- Laevicaulis schnitzleri

Helicarionidae

- Helicarion insularis (Thiele, 1911)

Helicidae

- Theba pisana (Müller, 1774)

Urocyclidae

- Atoxon faradjense Pilsbry, 1919
- Bukobia cockerelli Pilsbry, 1919
- Mesafricarion maculifer Pilsbry, 1919
- Mesafricarion putzeysi Pilsbry, 1919
- Trichotoxon maculatum perforatum Pilsbry
- Trichotoxon pardus Pilsbry, 1919
- Trichotoxon ruwenzoriense Pilsbry, 1919
- Upembella adami van Goethem, 1969
- Pleuroprocta silvatica

== Freshwater bivalves ==
Unionidae

- Coelatura stuhlmanni (Martens, 1897)

Iridinidae

- Mutela dubia (Gmelin, 1791)

Corbiculidae

- Corbicula fluminalis (O. F. Müller, 1774)

Sphaeriidae

- Sphaerium hartmanni (Jickeli, 1874)
- Pisidium casertanum (Poli, 1791)
- Pisidium kenianum Preston, 1911
- Pisidium pirothi Jickeli, 1881

== See also ==
- List of marine molluscs of the Democratic Republic of the Congo

Lists of molluscs of surrounding countries:

- List of non-marine molluscs of Angola
- List of non-marine molluscs of the Republic of the Congo
- List of non-marine molluscs of the Central African Republic
- List of non-marine molluscs of South Sudan
- List of non-marine molluscs of Uganda
- List of non-marine molluscs of Rwanda
- List of non-marine molluscs of Burundi
- List of non-marine molluscs of Tanzania
- List of non-marine molluscs of Zambia
