= Ampulla (gastropod) =

Scientific classification
- Kingdom: Animalia
- Phylum: Mollusca
- Class: Gastropoda
- Subclass: Caenogastropoda
- Order: Neogastropoda
- Family: Volutidae
- Genus: Ampulla; Röding, 1798

Synonyms
- Achatina (Cochlycopa) Hanley, 1841 ·; Halia Risso, 1829; Halia (Aulachalia) Sacco, 1893 (junior subjective synonym); Priamus Beck, 1838

Genus of gastropods

Ampulla is a genus of sea snails, marine gastropod mollusks in the subfamily Scaphellinae of the family Volutidae.

== Species ==
Species within the genus Ampulla include:

- Ampulla priamus (Gmelin, 1791)

== Synonyms ==
- Ampulla bombarda Röding, 1798: synonym of Achatina achatina (Linnaeus, 1758) (junior synonym)
- Ampulla flammea Röding, 1798: synonym of Achatina achatina (Linnaeus, 1758) (junior synonym)
- Ampulla kambeul Röding, 1798: synonym of Limicolaria kambeul (Bruguière, 1792) (junior subjective synonym)
- Ampulla lacteae Röding, 1798: synonym of Achatina achatina (Linnaeus, 1758) (junior synonym)
- Ampulla quagga Roding, 1798: synonym of Buccinum zebra ^{O. F. Müller, 1774}: synonym of Orthalicus zebra (O. F. Müller, 1774) (junior subjective synonym)
- Ampulla zebra Röding, 1798: synonym of Achatina zebra (Bruguière, 1792): synonym of Cochlitoma zebra (Bruguière, 1792) ( junior subjective synonym)

== Distribution ==
This genus is restricted to European and northwestern African waters.
