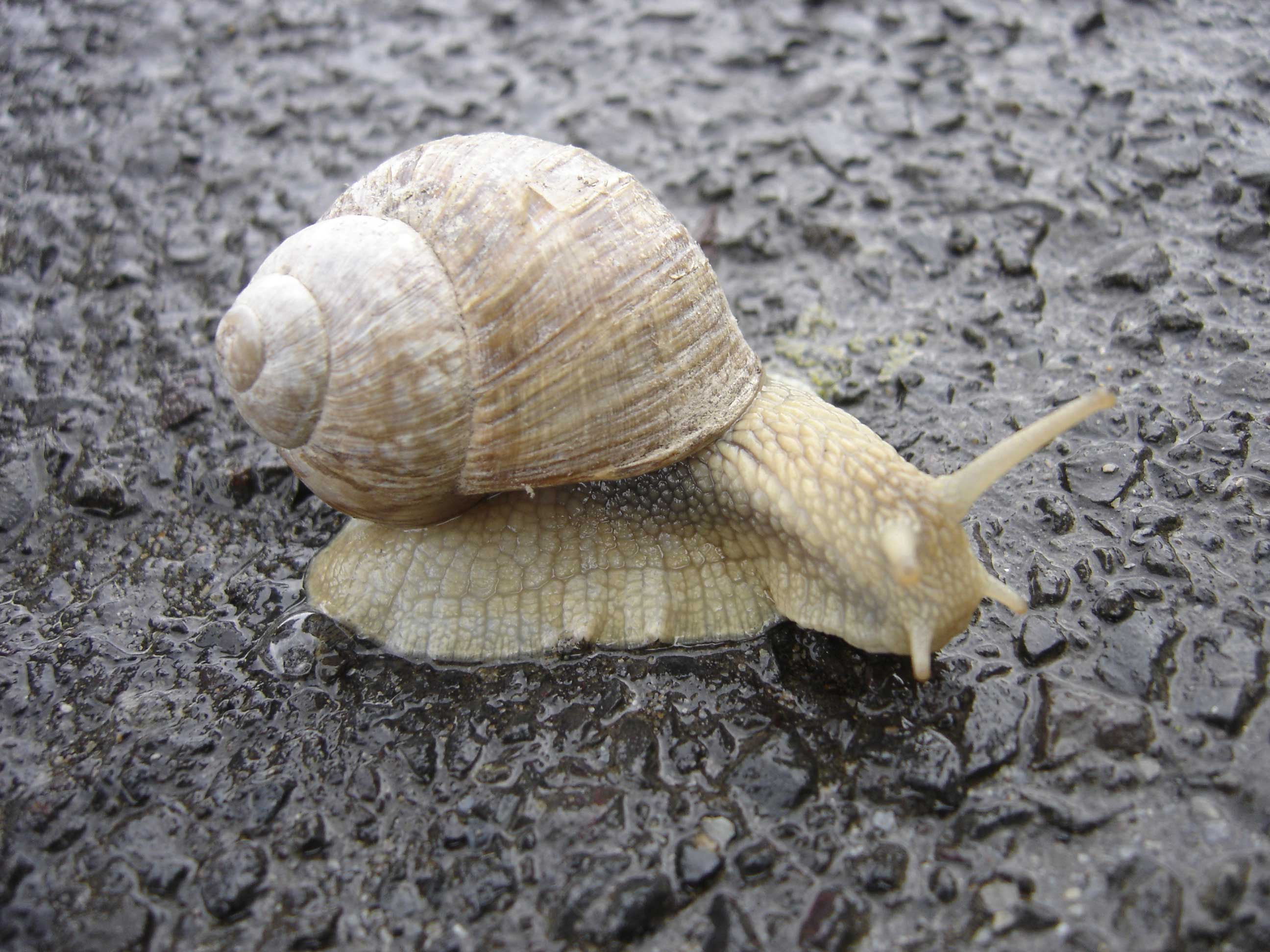
- Helix pomatia, a species of land snail

Scientific classification
- Kingdom: Animalia
- Phylum: Mollusca
- Class: Gastropoda

Groups excluded (but cladistically included)
- Slugs; Semi-slugs; Sea slugs; Aplysiida (sometimes)

= Snail =

Snails

Shelled gastropod

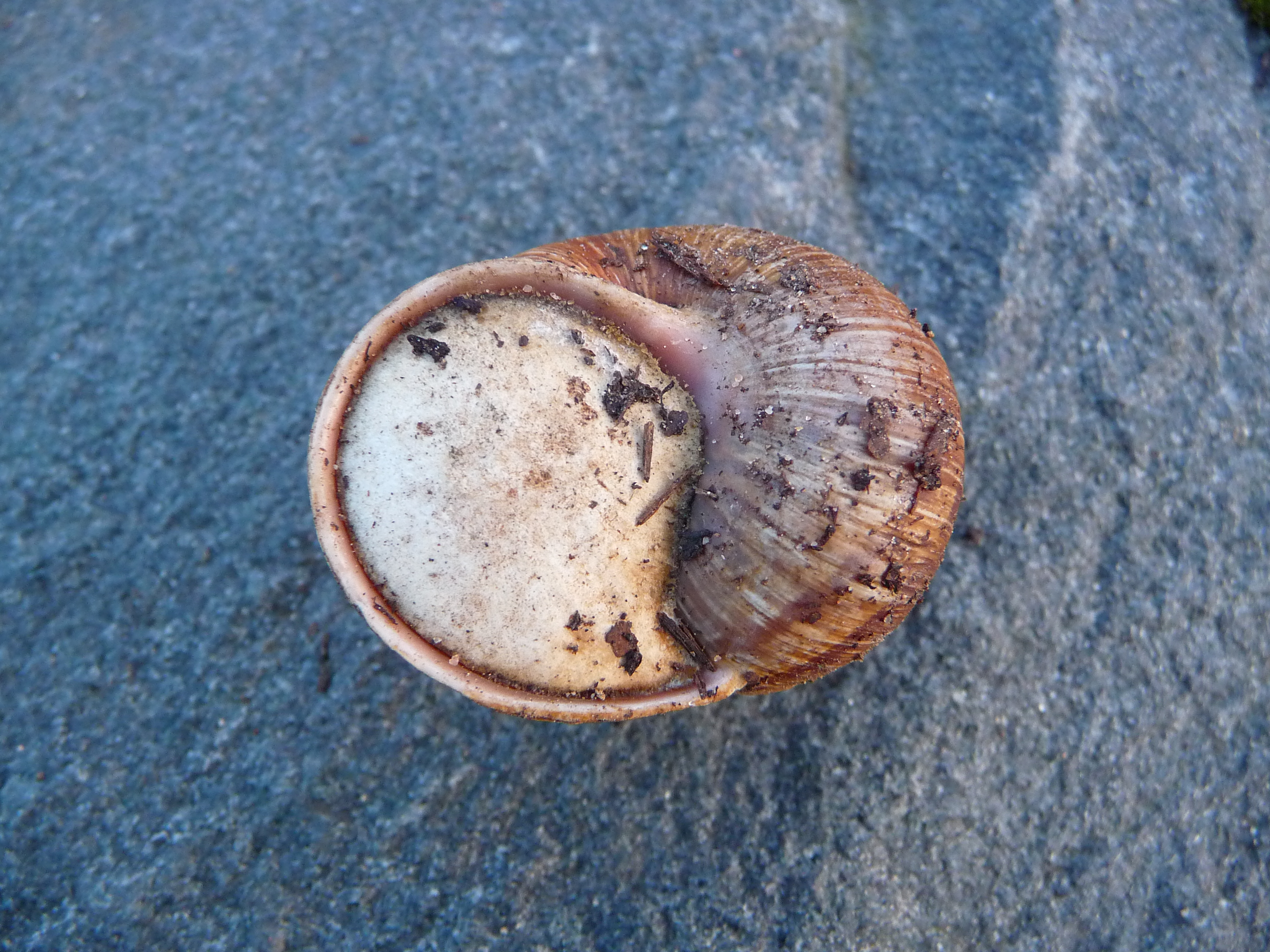
Helix pomatia sealed in its shell with a calcareous epiphragm

A snail is a shelled gastropod. The name is most often applied to land snails, terrestrial pulmonate gastropod molluscs. However, the common name snail is also used for most of the members of the molluscan class Gastropoda that have a coiled shell that is large enough for the animal to retract completely into. When the word "snail" is used in this most general sense, it includes not just land snails but also numerous species of sea snails and freshwater snails. Gastropods that naturally lack a shell, or have only an internal shell, are mostly called slugs, and land snails that have only a very small shell (that they cannot retract into) are sometimes called semi-slugs.

== Overview ==
Snails that respire using a lung belong to the group Pulmonata. As traditionally defined, the Pulmonata were found to be polyphyletic in a molecular study per Jörger et al., dating from 2010. But snails with gills also form a polyphyletic group; in other words, snails with lungs and snails with gills form a number of taxonomic groups that are not necessarily more closely related to each other than they are related to some other groups.

Both snails that have lungs and snails that have gills have diversified so widely over geological time that a few species with gills can be found on land and numerous species with lungs can be found in freshwater. Even a few marine species have lungs.

Snails can be found in a very wide range of environments. The environments including ditches, deserts, and the abyssal depths of the sea. Although land snails may be more familiar to laymen, marine snails constitute the majority of snail species, and have much greater diversity and a greater biomass. Numerous kinds of snail can also be found in fresh water.

Most snails have thousands of microscopic tooth-like structures located on a banded ribbon-like tongue called a radula. The radula works like a file, ripping food into small pieces. Many snails are herbivorous, eating plants or rasping algae from surfaces with their radulae, though a few land species and many marine species are omnivores or predatory carnivores. Snails cannot absorb colored pigments when eating paper or cardboard so their feces are also colored.

Several species of the genus Achatina and related genera are known as giant African land snails; some grow to 38 cm (15 in) from snout to tail, and weigh 1 kg (2 lb). The largest living species of sea snail is Syrinx aruanus; its shell can measure up to 90 cm (35 in) in length, and the whole animal with the shell can weigh up to 18 kg (40 lb). The smallest land snail, Angustopila psammion, was discovered in 2022 and measures 0.6 mm in diameter.

The largest known land gastropod is the African giant snail Achatina achatina, the largest recorded specimen of which measured 39.3 centimetres (15.5 in) from snout to tail when fully extended, with a shell length of 27.3 cm (10.7 in) in December 1978. It weighed exactly 900 g (about 2 lb). Named Gee Geronimo, this snail was owned by Christopher Hudson (1955–79) of Hove, East Sussex, UK, and was collected in Sierra Leone in June 1976.

Snails are protostomes, which means that during development, in the gastrulation phase, the blastopore forms the mouth first. Cleavage in snails follows spiral holoblastic patterning. In spiral holoblastic cleavage, the cleavage plane rotates each division and the cell divisions are complete. Snails do not undergo metamorphosis after hatching. Snails hatch in the form of small adults. The only additional development they will undergo is to consume calcium to strengthen their shell. Snails can be male, female, hermaphroditic, or parthenogenetic so there are many different systems of sexual determination.

== Anatomy ==
Snails have complex organ systems and anatomies that differ greatly from most animals. Snails and most other Mollusca share three anatomical features; the foot, the mantle, and the radula.

Foot
The foot is a muscular organ used by gastropods for locomotion. Both land and sea snails travel by contracting foot muscles to deform the mucus layer beneath it into different wave-like patterns. The snail's foot, in combination with the mucus layer it secretes, is critical to its use of sliding suction to attach to and move across various substrates at any angle. Snails use the liquid film between their foot and the substrate to reduce friction and to maintain the negative pressure differential that allows them to cling to and slide across surfaces. Thus, snails utilize foot suction and mucus adhesion to cling to and move across surfaces.

Mantle
The mantle is the organ that produces shells for most species of mollusca. In snails, the mantle secretes the shell along the snail shell opening, continuously growing and producing the shell for the entirety of the snail's life. The mantle creates a compartment known as the mantle cavity and is used by many mollusca as the surface where gas exchange occurs. Snails that use the mantle cavity as a lung are known as Pulmonate snails. Other snails may only have a gill. Snails in the Caenogastropoda families like Ampullariidae, have both a gill and a lung.
Shell

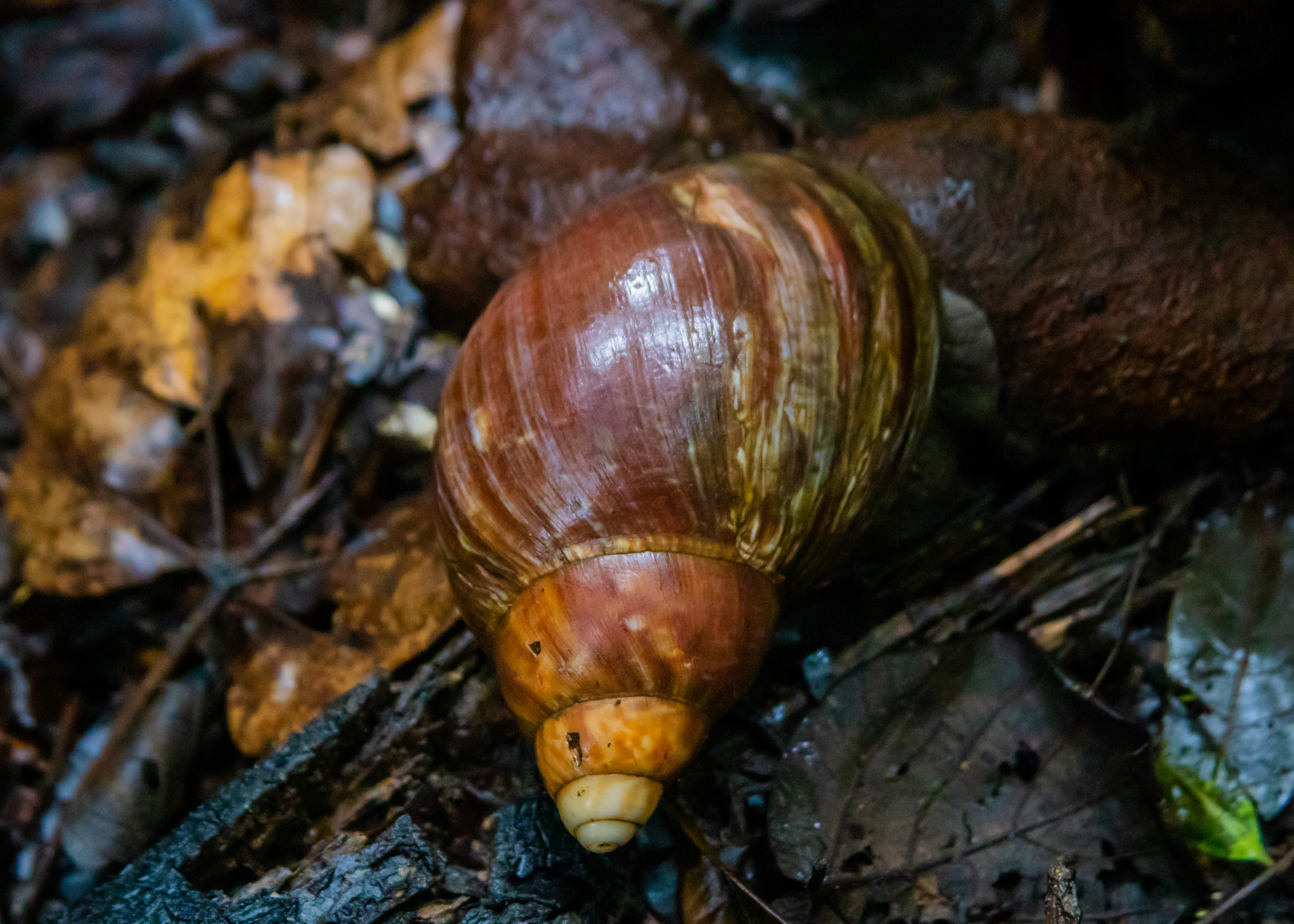
Snail shell

Snail shells are mainly composed of a mixture of proteins called conchin, and calcium carbonate. Conchin is the main component in the outer layer of the shell, known as the periostracum. The inner layers of the shell are composed of a network of calcium carbonate, conchin, and different mineral salts. The mantle produces the shell through addition around a central axis called the columella, causing a spiraling pattern. The spiraling patterns on a snail's shell are known as coils or whorls. Whorl size generally increases as the snail ages. Size differences in shell size are believed to be mainly influenced by genetic and environmental components. Moister conditions often correlate with larger snails. In larger populations, adult snails attain smaller shell sizes due to the effects of pheromones on growth rate.
Radula
The radula is an anatomical structure used by most species of Mollusca for feeding. Gastropods are morphologically highly variable and have diverse feeding strategies. Snails can be herbivores, detritivores, scavengers, parasites, ciliary feeders, or have highly specialized predation. Nearly all snails utilize a feeding apparatus including the oral structures of one or more jaws and the radula. The radula comprises a chitinous ribbon with teeth arranged in transverse and longitudinal rows. The radula continually renews itself during the entire lifespan of a mollusk. The teeth and membrane are continuously synthesized in the radular sac and then shifted forward towards the working zone of the radula. The teeth harden and mineralize during their travel to the working zone. The presence of the radula is common throughout most snail species, but often differs in many characteristics, like the shape, size, and number of odontoblasts that form a tooth.

== Diet ==
Snail eating a leaf

The average snail's diet varies greatly depending on the species, including different feeding styles from herbivores to highly specialized feeders and parasites. Some snails like Euglandina rosea, or rosy wolfsnail, are carnivorous and prey on other snails. However, most land snails are herbivores or omnivores. Among land snails, there is also a large variation in preference for specific food. For example, Cepaea nemoralis, or the grove snail, prefers dead plant material over fresh herbs or grasses. Age may also impact food preference, with adult grove snails showing a significantly larger preference for dead plant material than juvenile grove snails. Other snails, like the generalist herbivore Arianta arbustorum, or copse snail, choose their meals based on availability, consuming a mix of arthropods, wilted flowers, fresh and decayed plant material, and soil.

Generally, land snails are most active at night due to the damp weather. The humid nighttime air minimizes water evaporation and is beneficial to land snails because their movement requires mucus, which is mostly composed of water. In addition to aiding movement, mucus plays a vital role in transporting food from the gill to the mouth, cleansing the mantle cavity, and trapping food before ingestion.

== Slugs ==
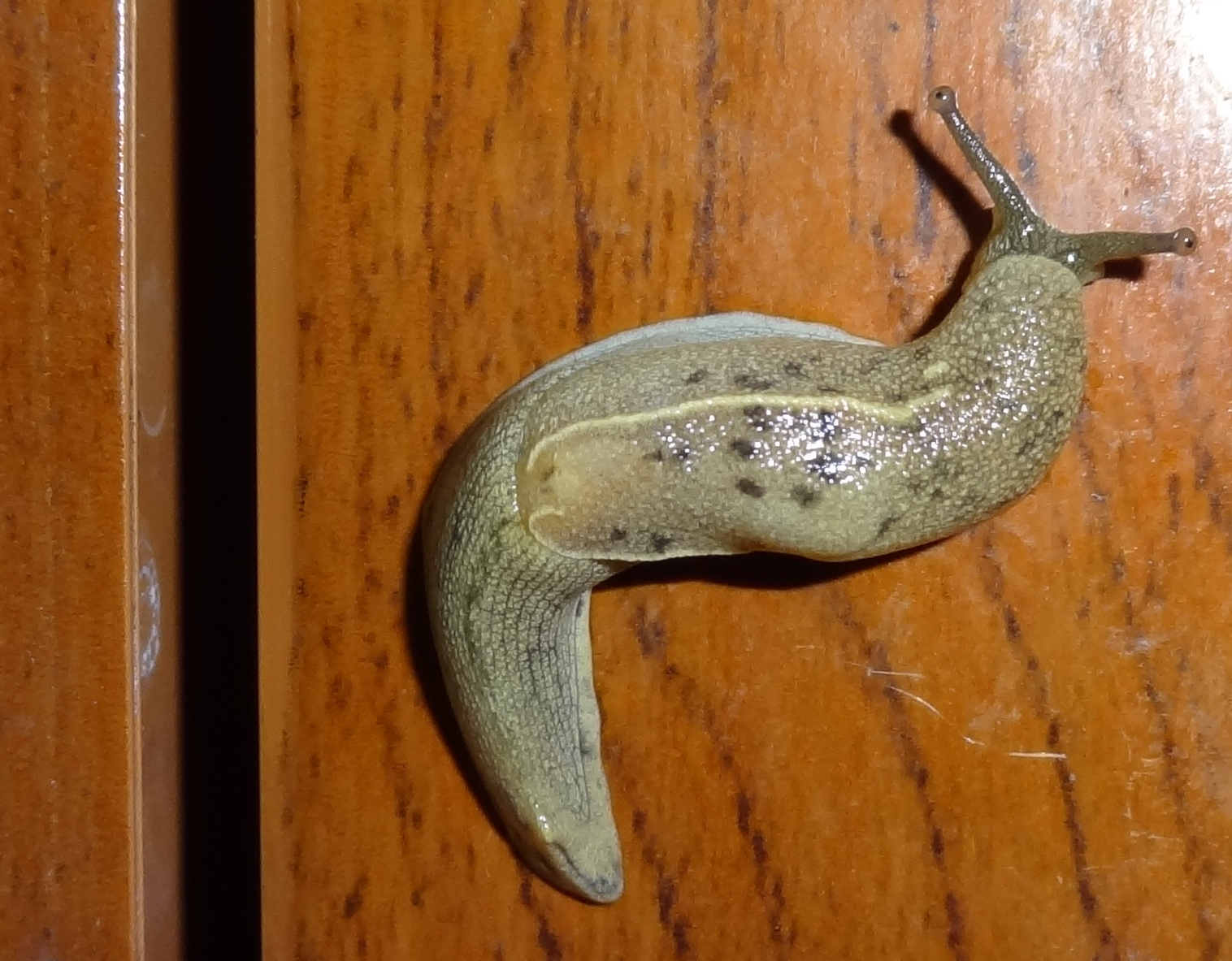
Slug

Gastropods that lack a conspicuous shell are commonly called slugs rather than snails. Some species of slug have a maroon-brown shell, some have only an internal vestige that serves mainly as a calcium lactate repository, and others have some to no shell at all. Other than that, there is little morphological difference between slugs and snails. There are however important differences in habitats and behavior.

A shell-less animal is much more maneuverable and compressible, so even quite large land slugs can take advantage of habitats or retreats with very little space, retreats that would be inaccessible to a similar-sized snail. Slugs squeeze themselves into confined spaces such as under loose bark on trees or under stone slabs, logs or wooden boards lying on the ground. In such retreats they are in less danger from either predators or desiccation. Those are often suitable places for laying their eggs.

Slugs as a group are far from monophyletic; scientifically speaking "slug" is a term of convenience with little taxonomic significance. The reduction or loss of the shell has evolved many times independently within several very different lineages of gastropods. The various taxa of land and sea gastropods with slug morphology occur within numerous higher taxonomic groups of shelled species; such independent slug taxa are not in general closely related to one another.

== Parasitic diseases ==
Snails can act as intermediate hosts for a number of human-transmittable parasitic diseases, such as schistosomiasis, angiostrongyliasis, fasciolopsiasis, opisthorchiasis, fascioliasis, paragonimiasis and clonorchiasis.

== Human relevance ==
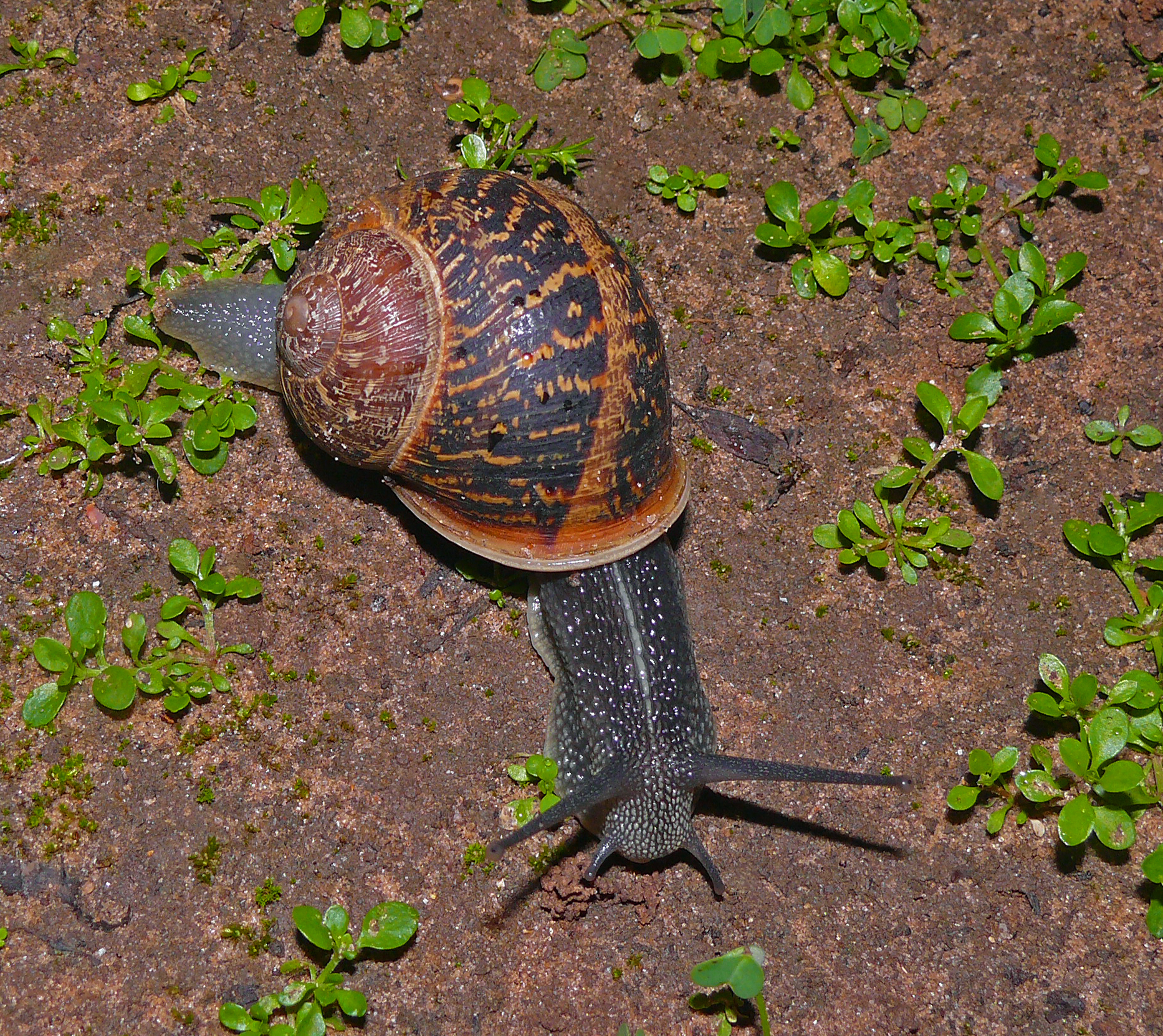
Cornu aspersum – garden snail

Land snails are known as an agricultural and garden pest but some species are an edible delicacy and occasionally household pets. In addition, their mucus can also be used for skin care products. Additionally, the sliding suction force snails use to adhere to surfaces has been studied for potential applications in vacuum suction and robotics. Climbing robots have been developed using several adhesion strategies, including suction, but as adhesive force increases, so does the induced friction force between the adhesive pads and climbing substrate. Snails maintain a high suction force whilst sliding on substrate simultaneously; the mucus layer secreted by the snail both reduces its coefficient of friction and enhances suction by sealing any gaps between the foot and the substrate. Waves of muscular contraction in the foot then generate driving force and a negative pressure cavity. Water-induced friction reduction has been recreated between layers of hydrophobic and hydrophilic silicone.

=== In agriculture ===
There is a variety of snail-control measures that gardeners and farmers use in an attempt to reduce damage to valuable plants. Traditional pesticides are still used, as are many less toxic control options such as concentrated garlic or wormwood solutions. Copper is also a snail repellent, and thus a copper band around the trunk of a tree will prevent snails from climbing up and reaching the foliage and fruit. A layer of a dry, finely ground, and scratchy substance such as diatomaceous earth can also deter snails.

The decollate snail (Rumina decollata) captures and eats garden snails and has therefore sometimes been introduced as a biological pest control agent. However, this is not without problems, as the decollate snail is just as likely to attack and devour other gastropods that may represent a valuable part of the native fauna of the region.

=== Textiles ===
Certain varieties of snails, notably the family Muricidae, produce a secretion that is a color-fast natural dye. The ancient Tyrian purple was made in this way as were other purple and blue dyes. The extreme expense of extracting this secretion in sufficient quantities limited its use to the very wealthy. It is such dyes as these that led to certain shades of purple and blue being associated with royalty and wealth.

=== As pets ===
Throughout history, snails have been kept as pets. There are many famous snails such as Lefty (Born Jeremy) and within fiction, Gary and Brian the snail.

=== Culinary use ===
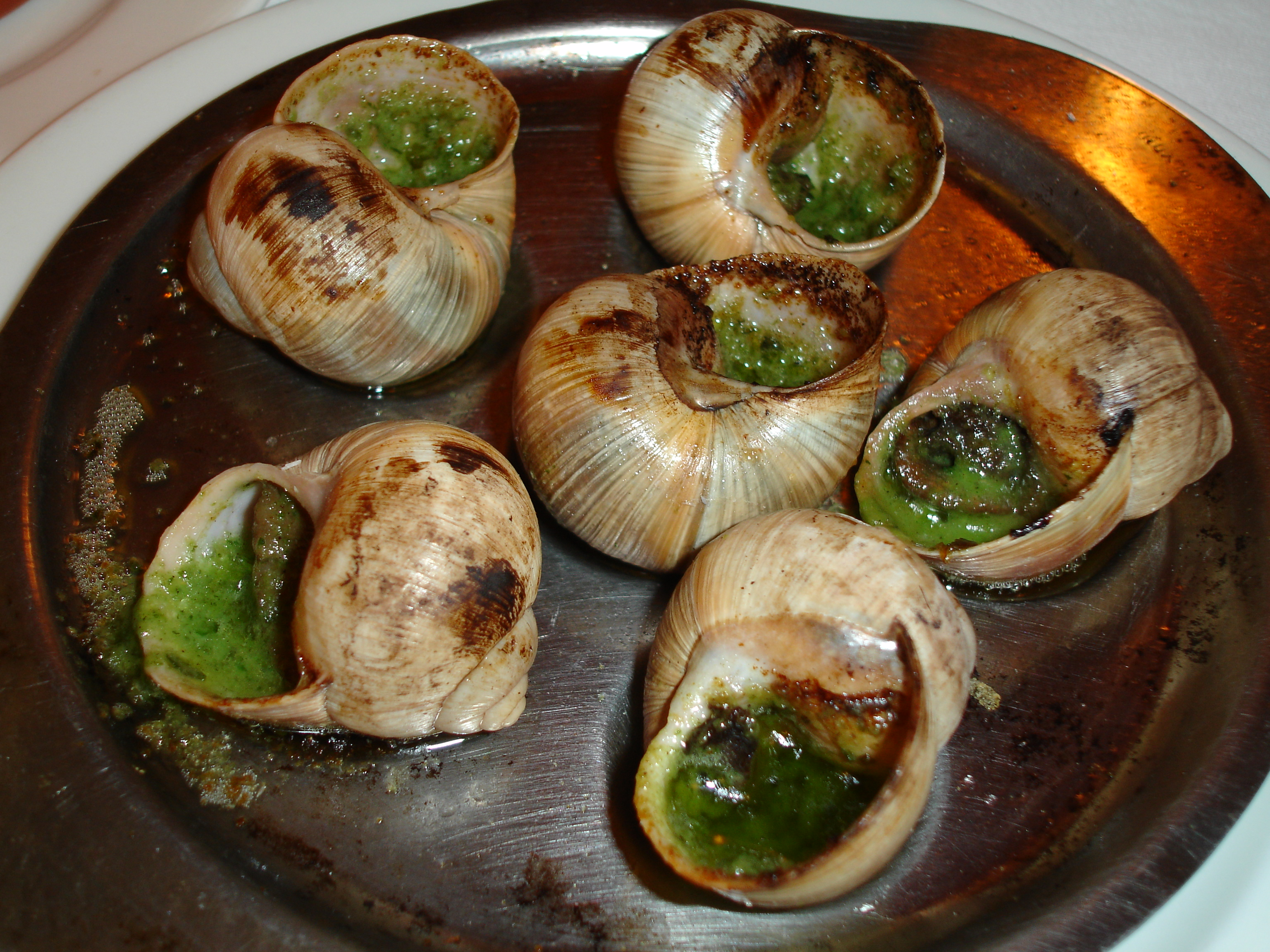
French cooked snails

In French cuisine, edible snails are served for instance in Escargot à la Bourguignonne. The practice of rearing snails for food is known as heliciculture. For purposes of cultivation, the snails are kept in a dark place in a wired cage with dry straw or dry wood. Coppiced wine-grape vines are often used for this purpose. During the rainy period, the snails come out of hibernation and release most of their mucus onto the dry wood/straw. The snails are then prepared for cooking. Their texture when cooked is slightly chewy and tender.

As well as being eaten as gourmet food, several species of land snails provide an easily harvested source of protein to many people in poor communities around the world. Many land snails are valuable because they can feed on a wide range of agricultural wastes, such as shed leaves in banana plantations. In some countries, giant African land snails are produced commercially for food.

Land snails, freshwater snails and sea snails are all eaten in many countries. In certain parts of the world snails are fried. For example, in Indonesia, they are fried as satay, a dish known as sate kakul. The eggs of certain snail species are eaten in a fashion similar to the way caviar is eaten.

In Bulgaria, snails are traditionally cooked in an oven with rice or fried in a pan with vegetable oil and red paprika powder. Before they are used for those dishes, however, they are thoroughly boiled in hot water (for up to 90 minutes) and manually extracted from their shells. The two species most commonly used for food in the country are Helix lucorum and Helix pomatia.

Snails and slug species that are not normally eaten in certain areas have occasionally been used as famine food in historical times. A history of Scotland written in the 1800s recounts a description of various snails and their use as food items in times of plague.

=== Cultural depictions ===
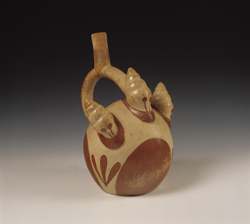
Land snails (Scutalus sp.) on a Moche pot, 200 AD, Larco Museum Collection, Lima, Peru

Because of its slowness, the snail has traditionally been seen as a symbol of laziness. In Christian culture, it has been used as a symbol of the deadly sin of sloth. In Mayan mythology, the snail is associated with sexual desire, being personified by the god Uayeb.

Snails were widely noted and used in divination. The Greek poet Hesiod wrote that snails signified the time to harvest by climbing the stalks, while the Aztec moon god Tecciztecatl bore a snail shell on his back. This symbolised rebirth; the snail's penchant for appearing and disappearing was analogised with the moon.

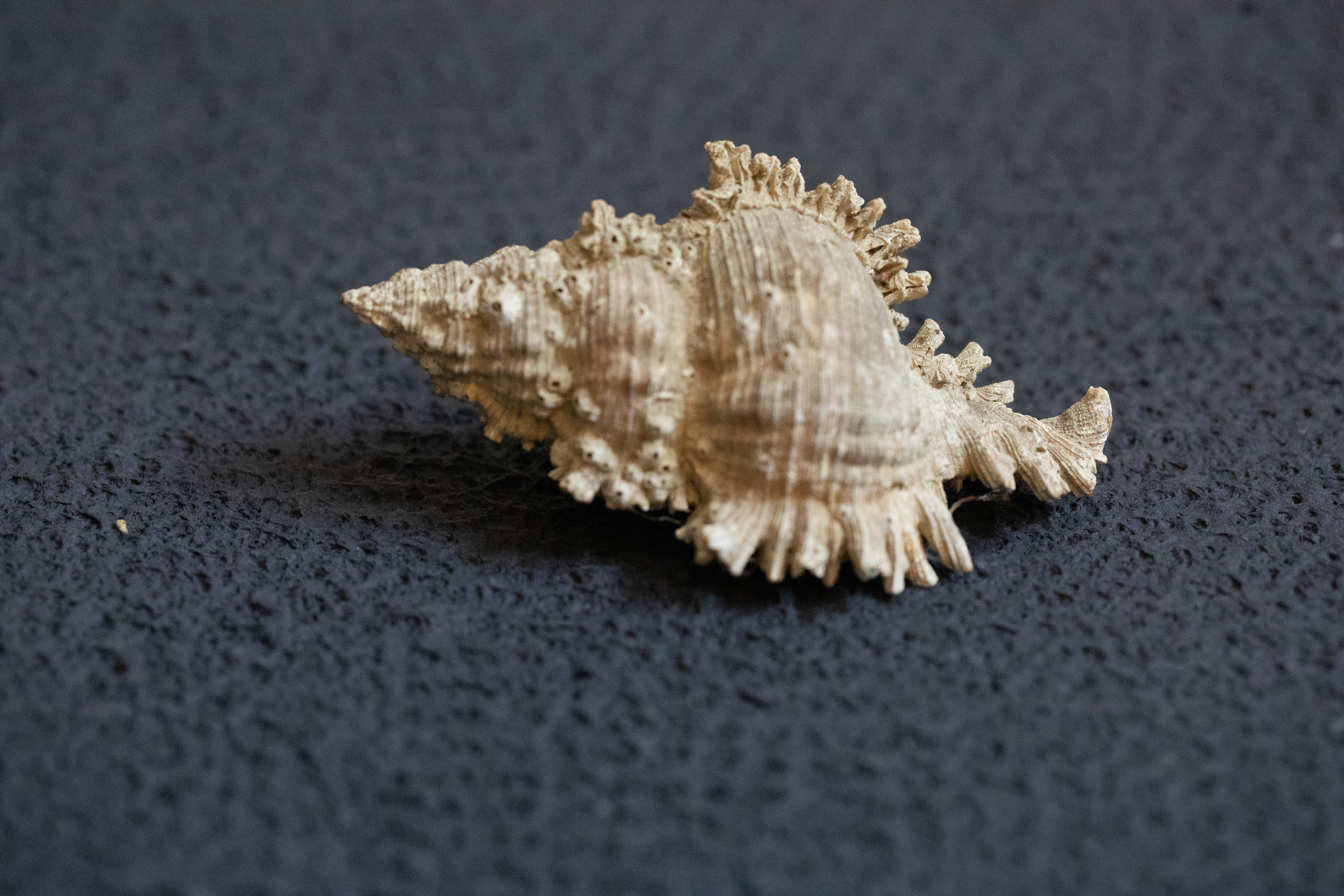
Dead snail

Keong Emas (Javanese and Indonesian for Golden Snail) is a popular Javanese folklore about a princess magically transformed and contained in a golden snail shell. The folklore is a part of popular Javanese Panji cycle telling the stories about the prince Panji Asmoro Bangun (also known as Raden Inu Kertapati) and his consort, princess Dewi Sekartaji (also known as Dewi Chandra Kirana).

In contemporary speech, the expression "a snail's pace" is often used to describe a slow, inefficient process. The phrase "snail mail" is used to mean regular postal service delivery of paper messages as opposed to the delivery of email, which can be virtually instantaneous.

== See also ==
- Pasilalinic-sympathetic compass

== Gallery ==
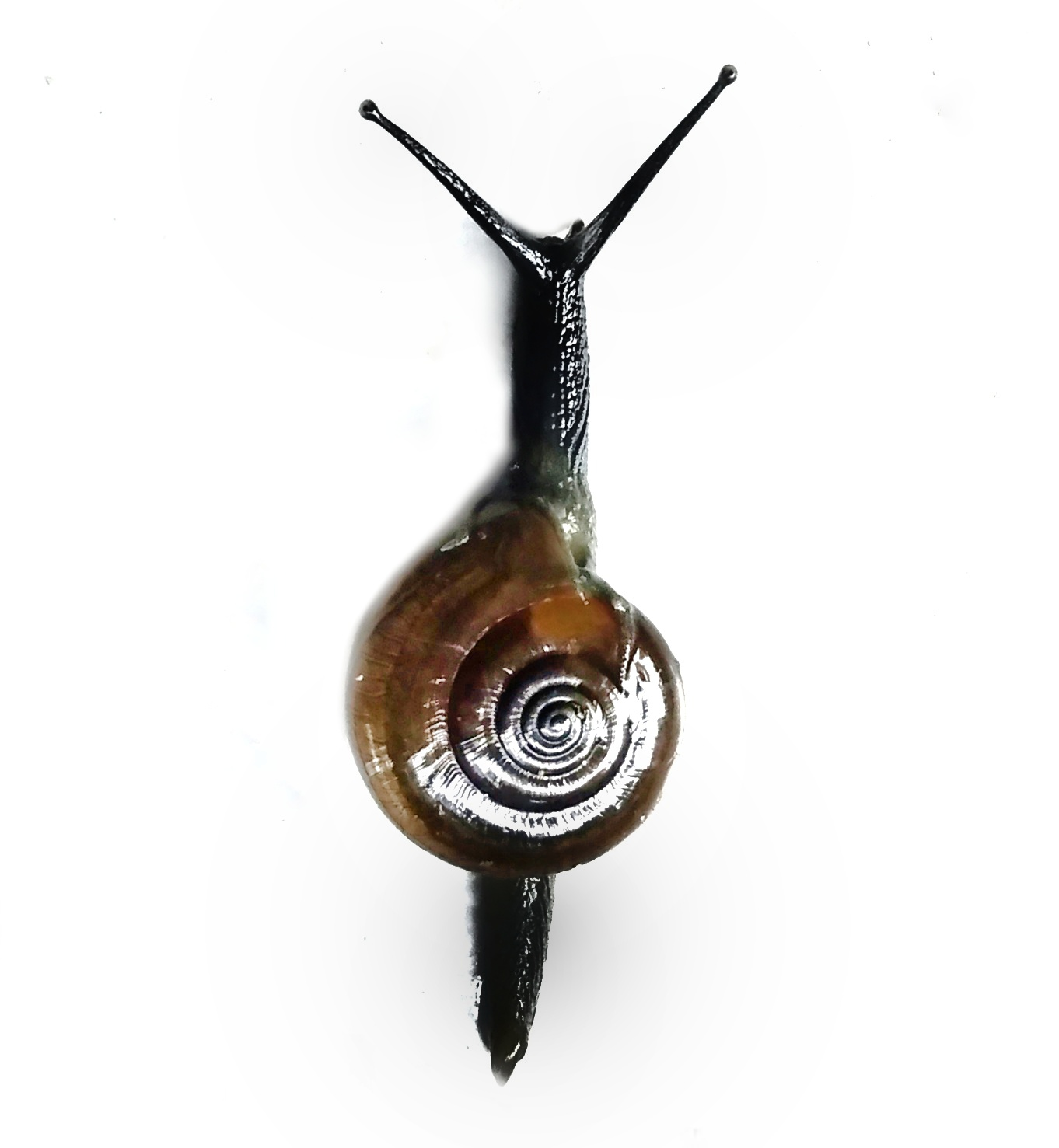
A snail

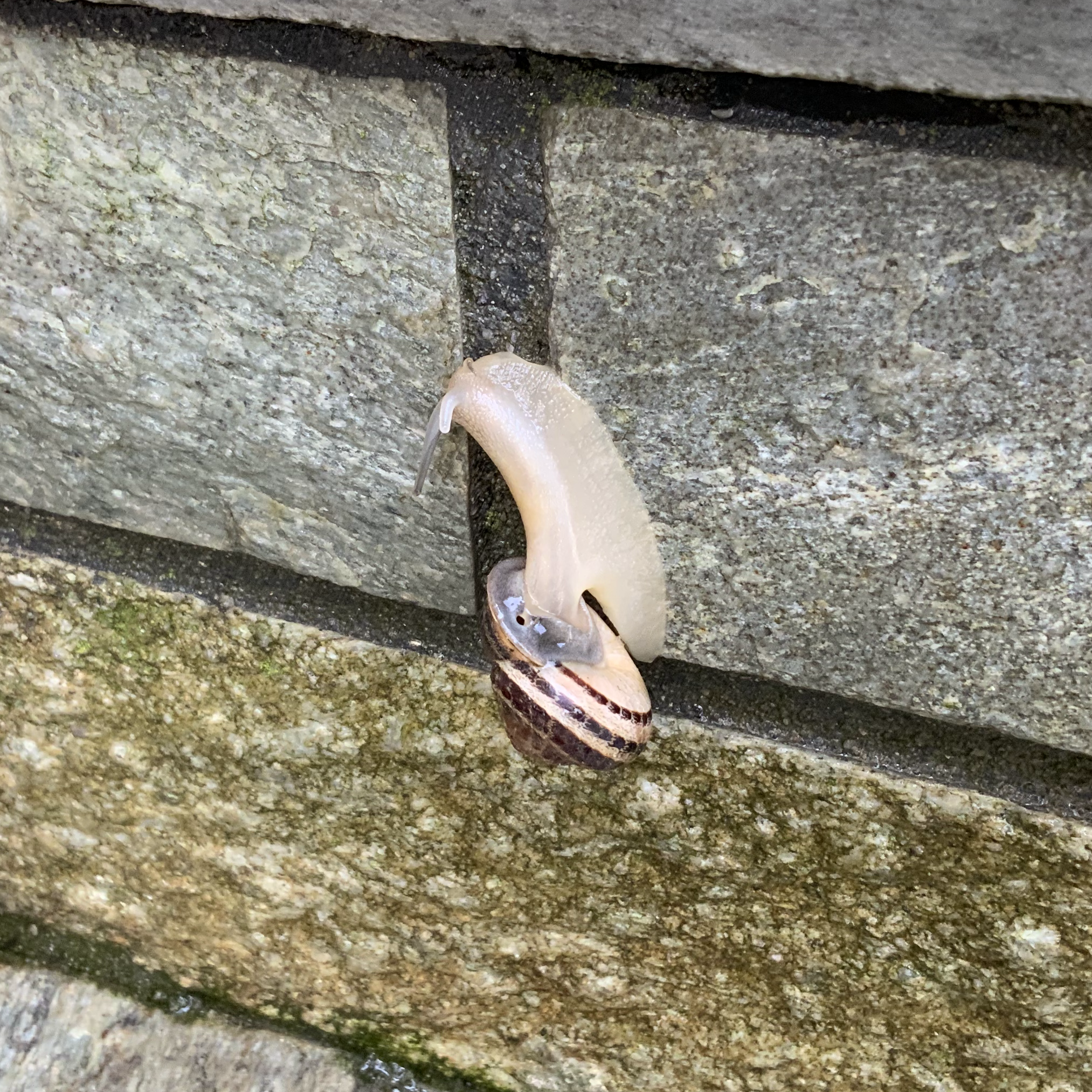
Snail climbing slabs at Servia, Greece. The shell is so heavy that its bottom side becomes visible.

Snails feeding on the sea floor (50 sec)

Video of snail after rain (31 sec)

Snail moving on a wet ground

Snail moving across leaves.

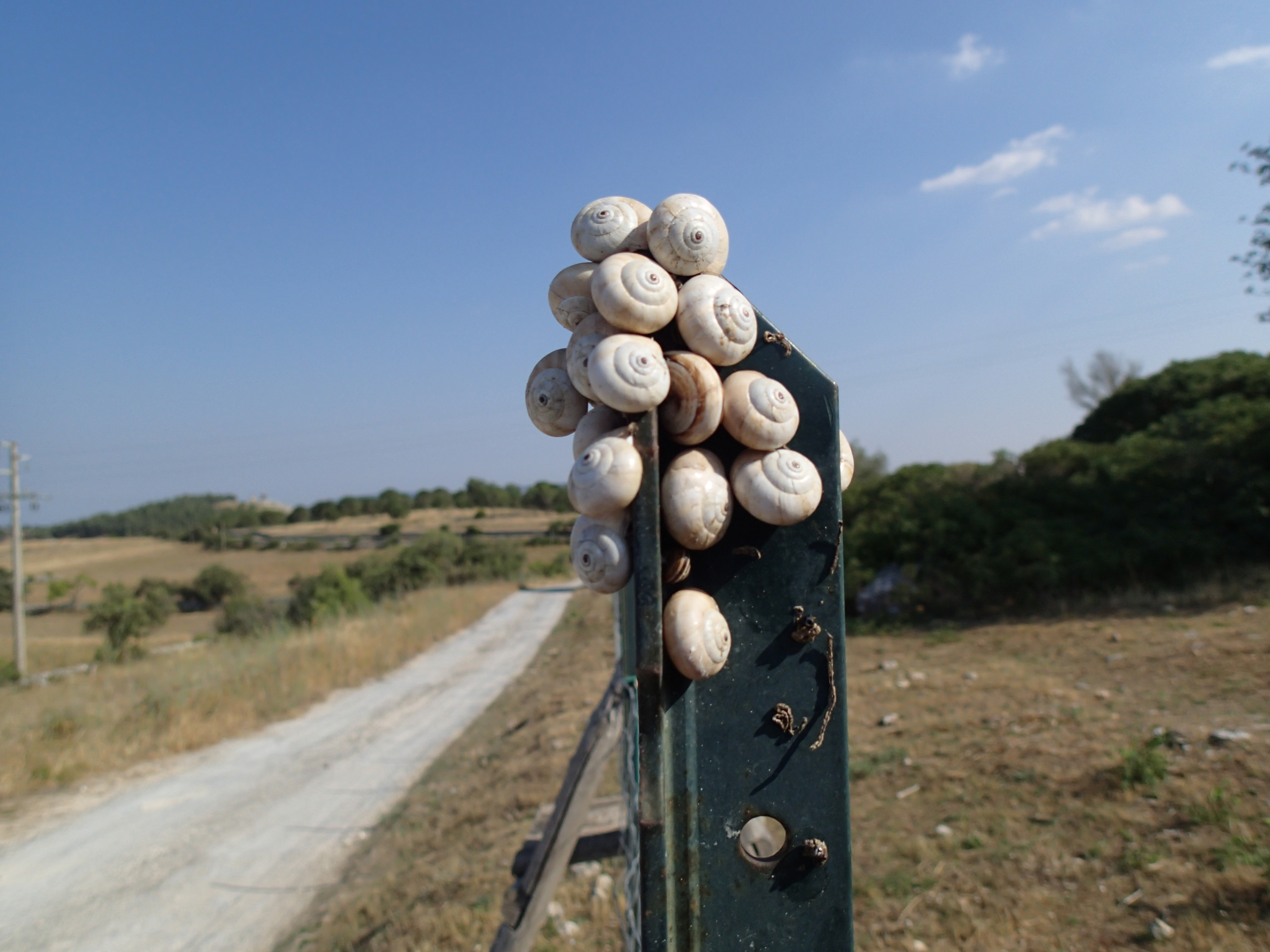
Snails in the Hyblaean Mountains.
