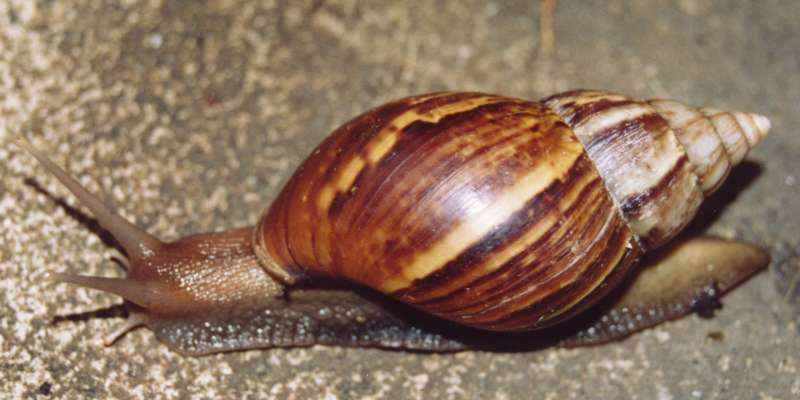
- A live individual of Lissachatina fulica from Thailand
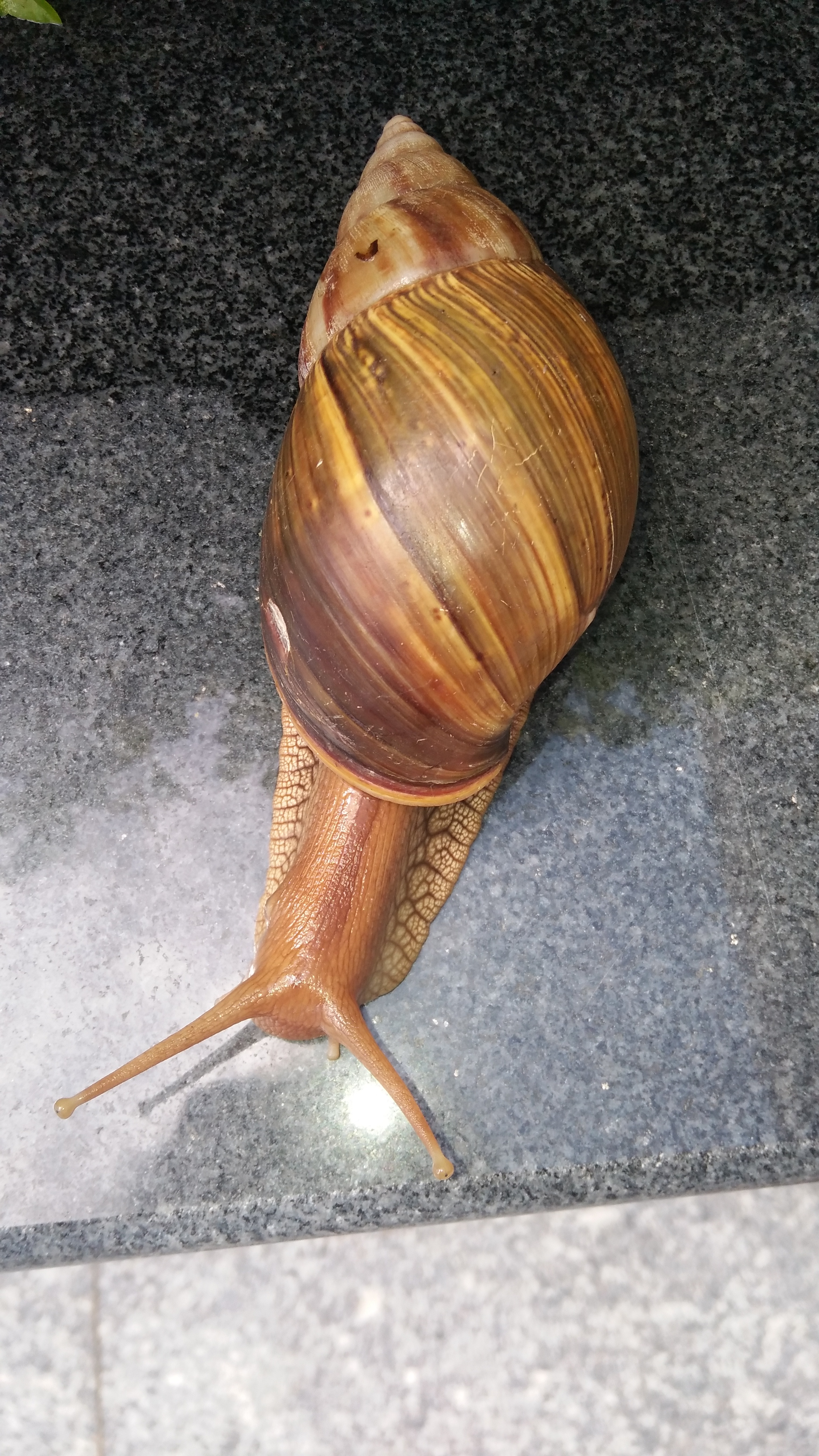
- A Lissachatina immaculata from China

Scientific classification
- Kingdom: Animalia
- Phylum: Mollusca
- Class: Gastropoda
- Order: Stylommatophora
- Suborder: Achatinina
- Superfamily: Achatinoidea
- Family: Achatinidae
- Genus: Lissachatina; Bequaert, 1950

Type species
- Achatina fulica Bowdich, 1822

Species
- See text

Synonyms
- Achatina (Euaethiopina) Bequaert, 1950 (junior synonym); Achatina (Lissachatina) Bequaert, 1950 (original combination); Euaethiops Clench & Archer, 1930 (Invalid: not Euaethiops Hampson, 1926; Euaethiopina is a replacement name)

= Lissachatina =

Genus of land snails

Lissachatina is a genus of air-breathing tropical land snails, terrestrial pulmonate gastropod mollusks in the subfamily Achatininae of the family Achatinidae.

The molecular data clearly shows that Lissachatina consistently clusters as a monophyletic entity separate from Achatina and Fontanilla stated that there is no basis for continuing to employ Lissachatina as a subgenus of Achatina and that it should be regarded as a genus in its own right.

== Species ==
- Lissachatina albopicta (E. A. Smith, 1878)
- Lissachatina allisa (L. Reeve, 1849)
- Lissachatina bloyeti (Bourguignat, 1890)
- Lissachatina capelloi (Furtado, 1886)
- Lissachatina eleanorae (Mead, 1995)
- Lissachatina fulica (Bowdich, 1822)
- Lissachatina glaucina (E. A. Smith, 1899)
- Lissachatina glutinosa (L. Pfeiffer, 1854)
- Lissachatina immaculata (Lamarck, 1822)
- Lissachatina johnstoni (E. A. Smith, 1899)
- Lissachatina kilimae (Dautzenberg, 1908)
- Lissachatina lactea (L. Reeve, 1842)
- Lissachatina loveridgei (Clench & Archer, 1930)
- Lissachatina reticulata (L. Pfeiffer, 1845)
- Lissachatina zanzibarica (Bourguignat, 1879)

Species brought into synonymy

- Lissachatina yalaensis (Germain, 1936): synonym of Oreohomorus connollyi (Odhner, 1932)
