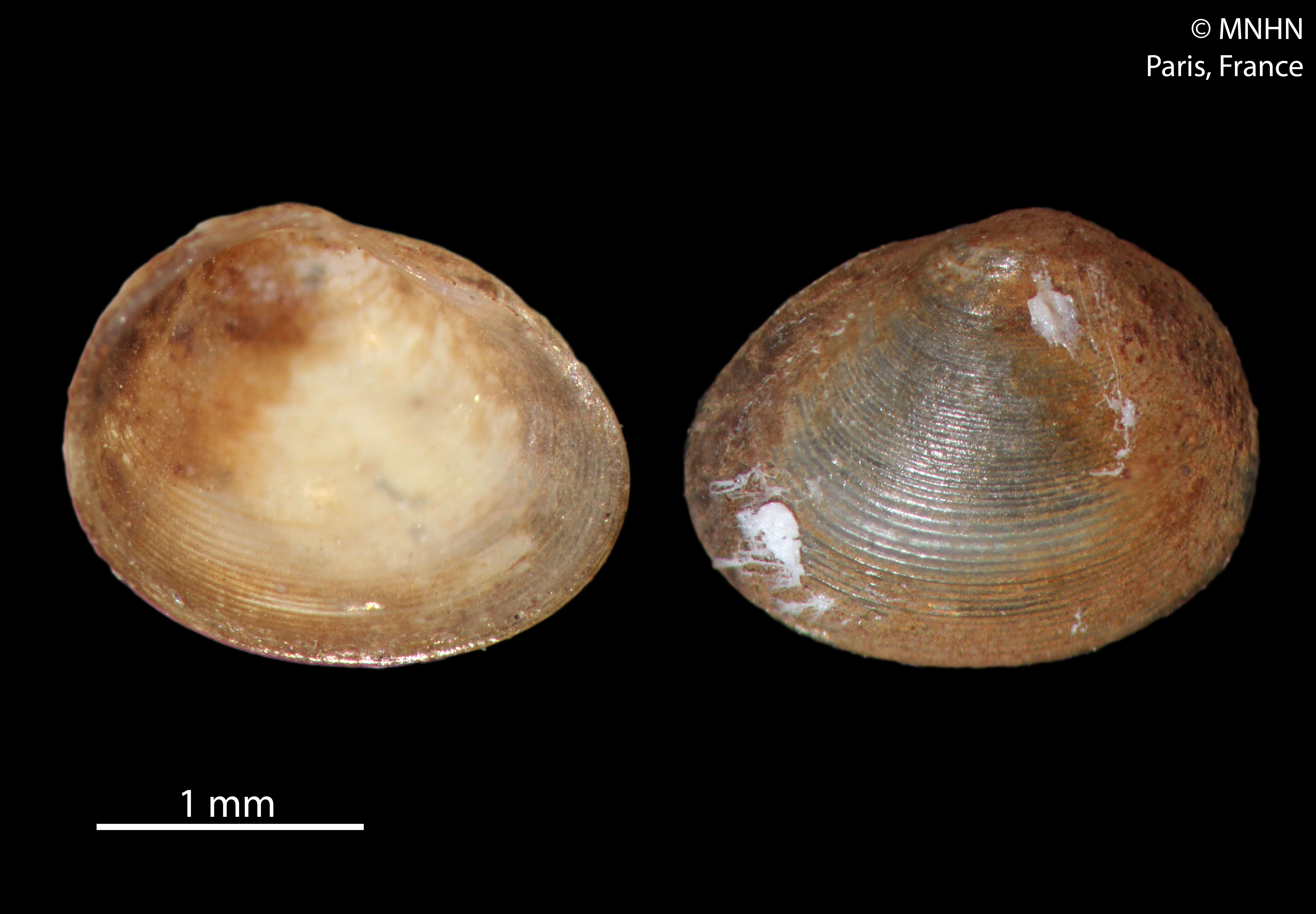
- Afropisidium aslini

Scientific classification
- Domain: Eukaryota
- Kingdom: Animalia
- Phylum: Mollusca
- Class: Bivalvia
- Order: Sphaeriida
- Family: Sphaeriidae
- Genus: Afropisidium; Kuiper, 1962

= Afropisidium =

Genus of bivalves

Afropisidium is a genus of bivalves belonging to the family Sphaeriidae.

The species of this genus are found in Southern America, Africa and Southeastern Asia.

Species:

- Afropisidium aslini (Kuiper, 1983)
- Afropisidium chandanbariensis (Nesemann, Shah & Tachamo, 2007)
- Afropisidium chilensis (d'Orbigny, 1846)
- Afropisidium clarkeanum (G.Nevill & H.Nevill, 1871)
- Afropisidium ellisi (Dance, 1967)
- Afropisidium giraudi (Bourguignat, 1885)
- Afropisidium hodgkini (Suter, 1905)
- Afropisidium javanum (van Benthem Jutting, 1931)
- Afropisidium nevillianum (Theobald, 1876)
- Afropisidium pirothi (Jickeli, 1881)
- Afropisidium sterkianum (Pilsbry, 1897)
- Afropisidium stoliczkanum (Prashad, 1933)
- Afropisidium sundanum (B.Rensch, 1934)
