= Achatina vassei =

- Apertural view of the holotype of Achatina vassei

Scientific classification
- Kingdom: Animalia
- Phylum: Mollusca
- Class: Gastropoda
- Order: Stylommatophora
- Family: Achatinidae
- Genus: Achatina
- Species: A. vassei

Binomial name
- Achatina vassei Germain, 1918

Synonyms
- Achatina (Achatina) vassei Germain, 1918 · alternate representation (basionym); Achatina (Lissachatina) vassei Germain, 1918 superseded combination

Species of gastropod

Achatina vassei is a species of air-breathing land snail, a terrestrial pulmonate gastropod mollusk in the family Achatinidae, the giant African snails.

Of ‘Achatina’ vassei only the holotype was known up to 2010. The collector of the type shell, Guillaume Vasse, was a French big game hunter, who spent roughly two years (1904-1907) in central Mozambique with his wife, collecting mammals, birds, insects, molluscs (very few), and plants for the Paris Museum of Natural History. The type specimen is stored in the Muséum national d'histoire naturelle, Paris (MNHN Mollusca No. 21490).

Another discovery of shells at a second locality was published in 2010. Those shells are stored in the Netherlands Centre for Biodiversity Naturalis, Leiden. There appears to be no other museum or collection that holds material of this species.

The systematic position of this species is still unclear because of the lack of anatomical data; this taxon is probably a species with a restricted range centered on the plateau of Central Mozambique.

== Distribution ==
This species is probably endemic to Central Mozambique. This is an area where little malacological exploration has been carried out.

The type locality is "environs d’Andrada", Andrada (18°52’S 32°53’E), Mozambique. It is situated just east of the border with Zimbabwe northeast of Mutare.

Another shell has been collected from Gorongosa National Park, Sofala Province in Mozambique and published in 2010.

== Shell description ==
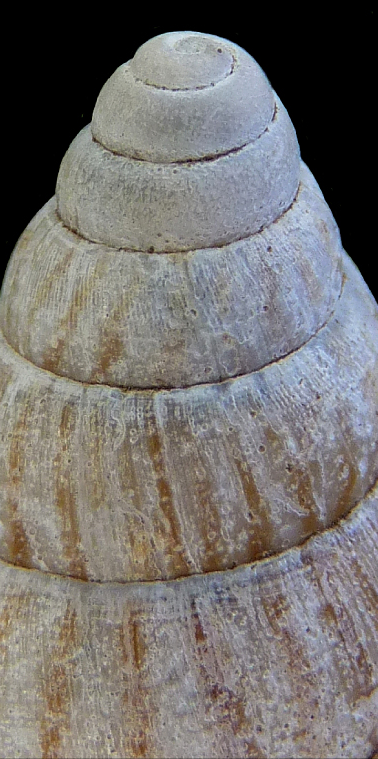
apex of Achatina vassei

The somewhat thin and fragile shell is small compared to what is known from the other achatinids in southern Africa, its length/height is less than 45 mm with about 7½ whorls. (This description is in contradiction to Connolly (1925), who probably attributes a wrongly identified shell 63.2 mm long to this taxon – a statement not repeated in his 1939 monograph.) The length is always more than two times the maximum diameter, which is situated at about the level of the apex of the aperture. The length of the aperture is always less than half that of the shell; the length of the last whorl in front view is always under three quarters of the total length. The apex is comparatively blunt. The whorls are hardly convex, including the body whorl. The aperture is fairly narrow (greatest width just under the middle) with a thin outer lip; the columella is white, short and narrow, concave with a slight twist, obliquely truncate close to the base. The nepionic whorls are wrinkled and granulose, though always worn in the material studied. The sculpture consists of regular and close wrinkles resulting in a reticulate-granulate pattern, very prominent below the sutures but well visible on all whorls; in addition there are very faint growth striae. All specimens exhibit a close and fine zebra pattern with irregular, orange-brown flames on a yellowish-brown background; there is a very thin and deciduous periostracum. On the whole this seems to be a well-defined taxon because of the size, shape and sculpture of the shell.

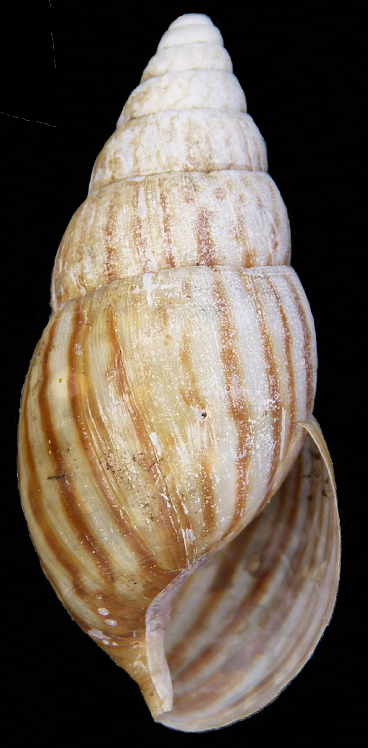
apertural view.

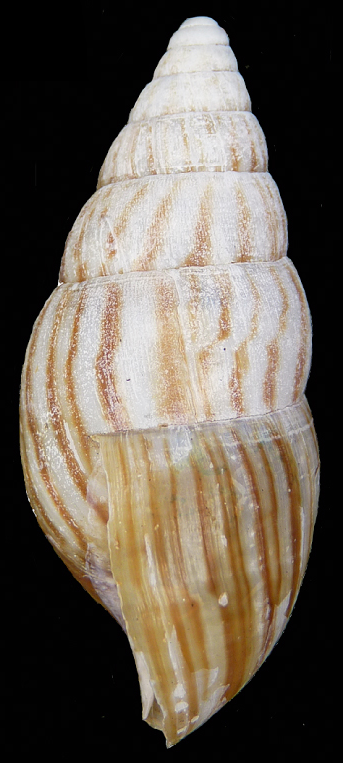
lateral view.

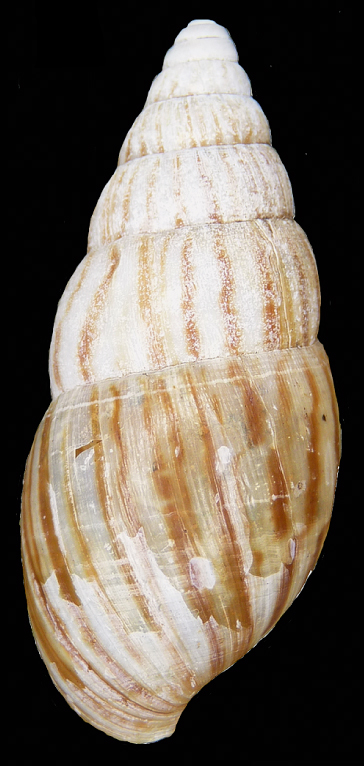
abapertural view.

== Anatomy ==
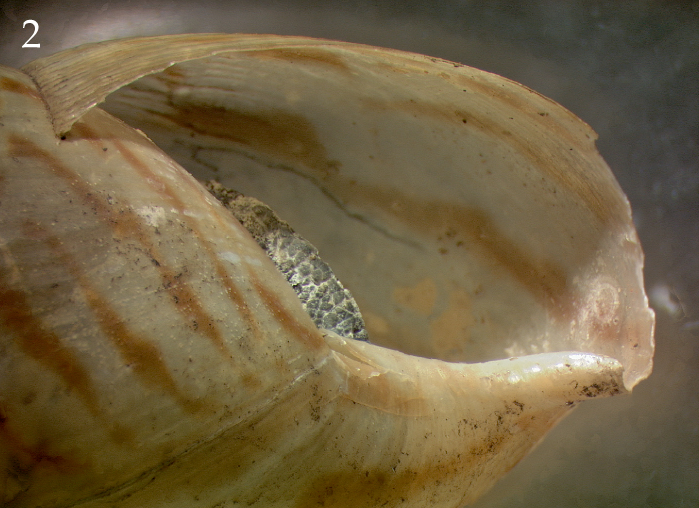
There is dried animal present in the shell of the holotype of Achatina vassei.

No material is available for investigating the vital genital anatomy. Incidentally, the animal of the type is still present withdrawn in the shell. This implies that, after more than a century, at least studies of a molecular nature and of the radula are still feasible. However, the latter can only be done after destroying the shell which for a holotype of a presumably rare species is certainly not advisable. At the moment no suggestion as to generic classification of ‘Achatina’ vassei can be made.
