= Achatina vignoniana =

Conservation status
- Data Deficient (IUCN 3.1)

Scientific classification
- Kingdom: Animalia
- Phylum: Mollusca
- Class: Gastropoda
- Order: Stylommatophora
- Superfamily: Achatinoidea
- Family: Achatinidae
- Genus: Achatina
- Species: A. vignoniana

Binomial name
- Achatina vignoniana Morelet, 1874

Synonyms
- Achatina vignoniana Morelet, 1874 (original combination)

Species of gastropod

Achatina vignoniana is a species of air-breathing land snail, a terrestrial pulmonate gastropod mollusc in the family Achatinidae, the giant African snails.

== Distribution ==
This species is endemic to Gabon.
