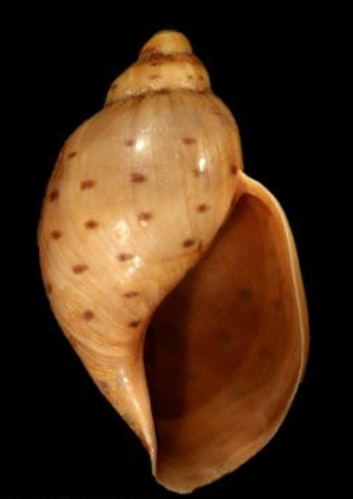

Scientific classification
- Kingdom: Animalia
- Phylum: Mollusca
- Class: Gastropoda
- Subclass: Caenogastropoda
- Order: Neogastropoda
- Family: Volutidae
- Genus: Ampulla
- Species: A. priamus

Binomial name
- Ampulla priamus (Gmelin, 1791)

Synonyms
- Achatina fulva sensu Deshayes, 1838 misapplication (not Bruguière, 1792); Achatina maculata Swainson, 1821; † Bulla helicoides Brocchi, 1814; Bulla stercuspulicum Gmelin, 1791; † Halia helicoides (Brocchi, 1814); Helix priamus Gmelin, 1791 (original combination)

= Ampulla priamus =

Species of gastropod

Ampulla priamus, common name the spotted flask snail, is a species of sea snail, a marine gastropod mollusk in the family Volutidae, the volutes.

== Description ==
The length of the shell attains 80 mm.

The shell is rather thin-shelled, inflated and broadly spindle-shaped. It features a moderate spire. It has a bluntly rounded protoconch of 2.5 whorls and three subsequent convex whorls that are inflated with an indented suture. The shell has a smooth sculpture. Fine, rather distant, microscopic spiral furrows are present,. The aperture is large and wide and it can be angled at the top; its interior is medium brown. The outer lip is flared, unevenly curved, and simple. The inner lip is long, very oblique, almost straight, with a little bend at either end.The pink columella is smooth, and the parietal area is lightly callous and is pale yellow-pink with red-brown spots. An indistinct fasciole is present, along with a wide, barely indented siphonal canal.

== Distribution ==
This species lives in the West Mediterranean Sea and the Atlantic Ocean, only from Morocco to the Iberian peninsula, including the Canary Islands.
