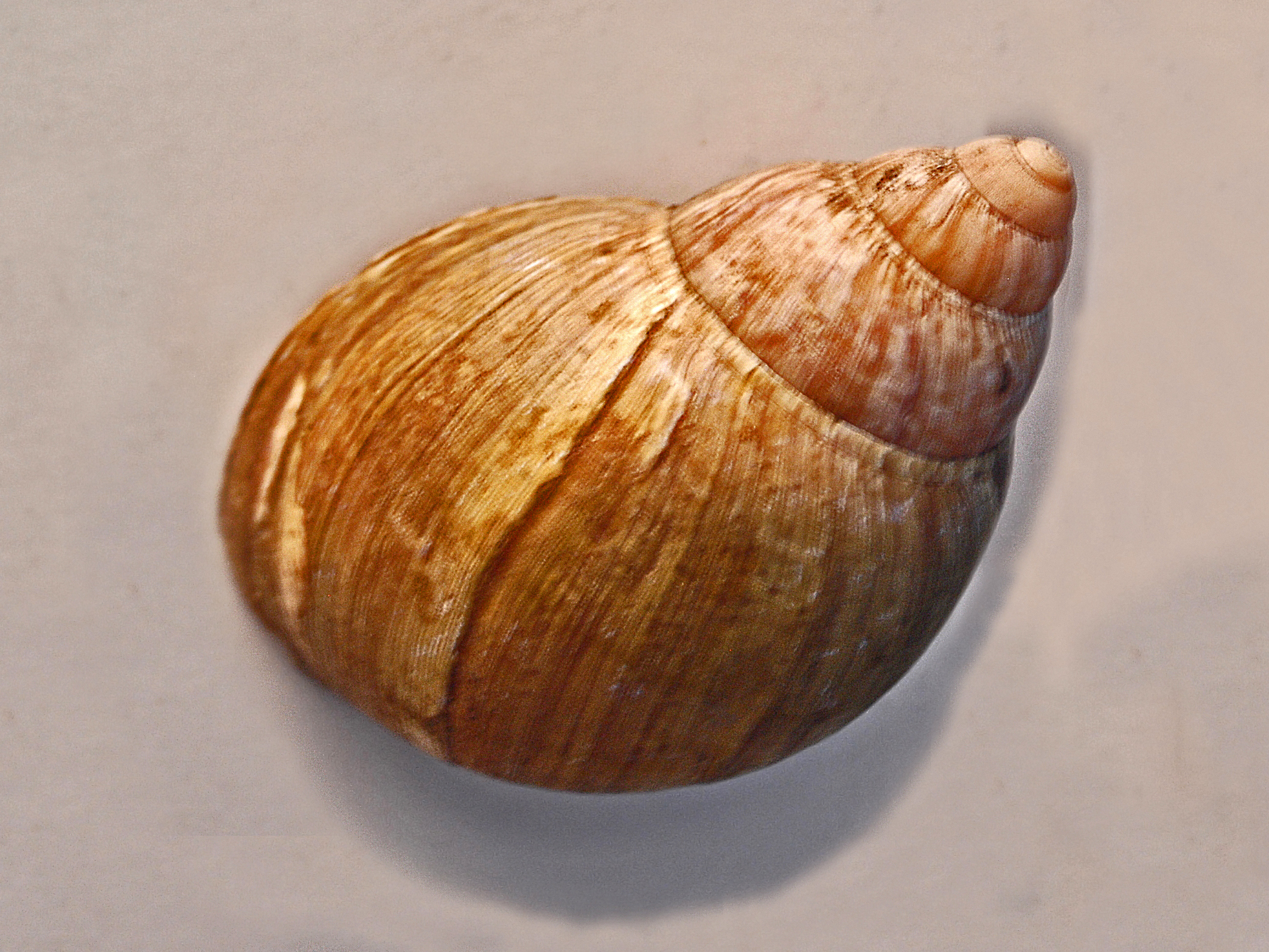
- Shell of Lissachatina glutinosa from Ethiopia on display at the Museo Civico di Storia Naturale di Milano
- This is an example of the Lissachatina Glutinosa in the albino variant

Scientific classification
- Kingdom: Animalia
- Phylum: Mollusca
- Class: Gastropoda
- Order: Stylommatophora
- Superfamily: Achatinoidea
- Family: Achatinidae
- Genus: Lissachatina
- Species: L. Glutinosa

Binomial name
- Lissachatina Glutinosa Pfeiffer, 1853

Synonyms
- Achatina (Lissachatina) glutinosa L. Pfeiffer, 1854· accepted, alternate representation; Achatina glutinosa L. Pfeiffer, 1854 (original combination); Achatina petersi E. von Martens, 1860

= Lissachatina glutinosa =

Species of gastropod

Lissachatina Glutinosa, a subspecies of the African land snail, is a species of air-breathing land snail, a terrestrial pulmonate gastropod mollusk in the family Achatinidae, the giant African snails.

== Description ==
Shells of this species can reach a length of about 10–15 centimetres (3.9–5.9 in).

== Distribution ==
This species is found in Tanzania, Malawi, Mozambique, Ethiopia and Zimbabwe.
