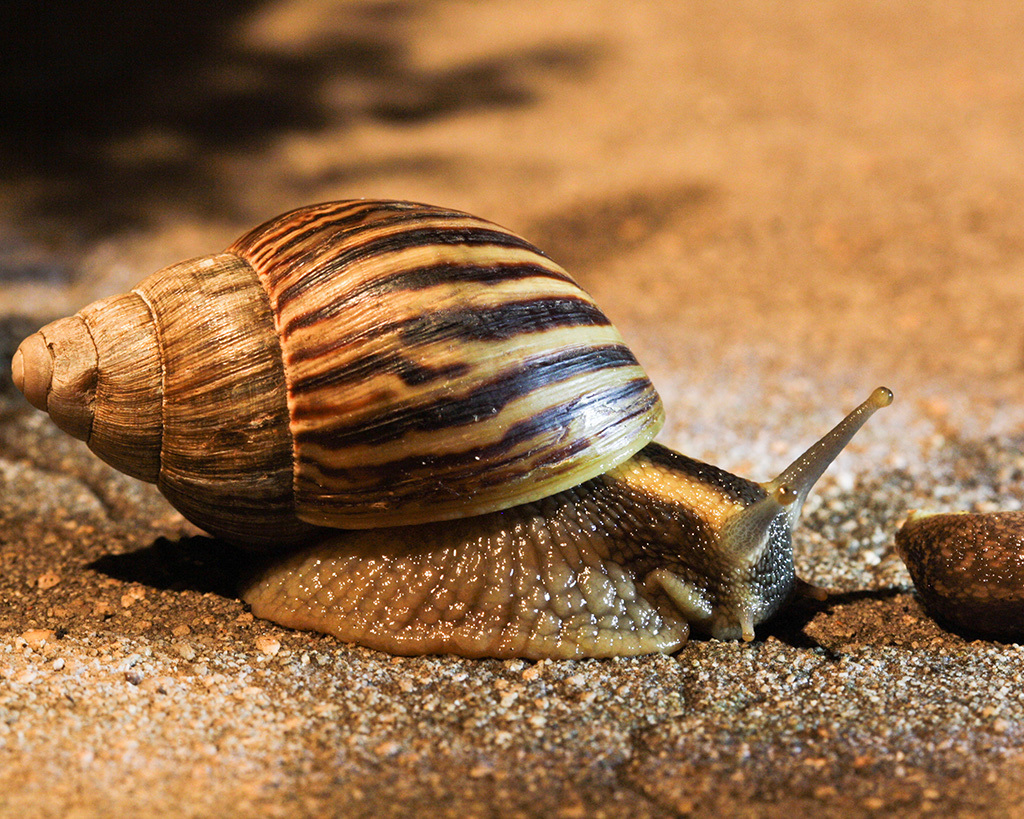

Scientific classification
- Kingdom: Animalia
- Phylum: Mollusca
- Class: Gastropoda
- Order: Stylommatophora
- Family: Achatinidae
- Genus: Cochlitoma
- Species: C. zebra

Binomial name
- Cochlitoma zebra (Bruguière, 1792)

Synonyms
- Achatina borniana Beck, 1837; Achatina capensis Albers in E. von Martens, 1860; Achatina chemnitziana L. Pfeiffer, 1842; Achatina indotata Reeve, 1849; Achatina zebra (Bruguière, 1792); Bulimus zebra Bruguière, 1792

= Cochlitoma zebra =

Species of snail

Cochlitoma zebra is a species of giant snail in the family Achatinidae.
