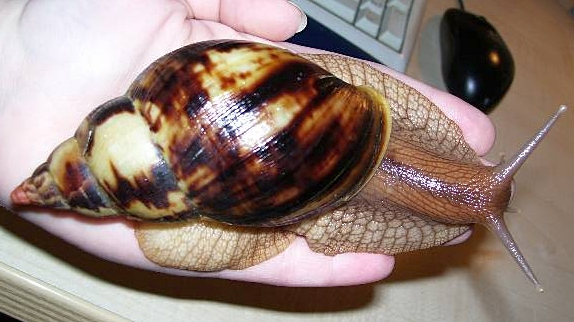

Scientific classification
- Kingdom: Animalia
- Phylum: Mollusca
- Class: Gastropoda
- Order: Stylommatophora
- Superfamily: Achatinoidea
- Family: Achatinidae
- Genus: Lissachatina
- Species: L. albopicta

Binomial name
- Lissachatina albopicta (E. A. Smith, 1878)

Synonyms
- Achatina albopicta E. A. Smith, 1878 (original combination); Achatina pilsbryi d'Ailly, 1910 (junior synonym)

= Lissachatina albopicta =

African land snail

Species of gastropod

Lissachatina albopicta, common name the African land snail, is a species of large air-breathing land snail, a terrestrial pulmonate gastropod mollusk in the family Achatinidae.

This species is native to Kenya.
