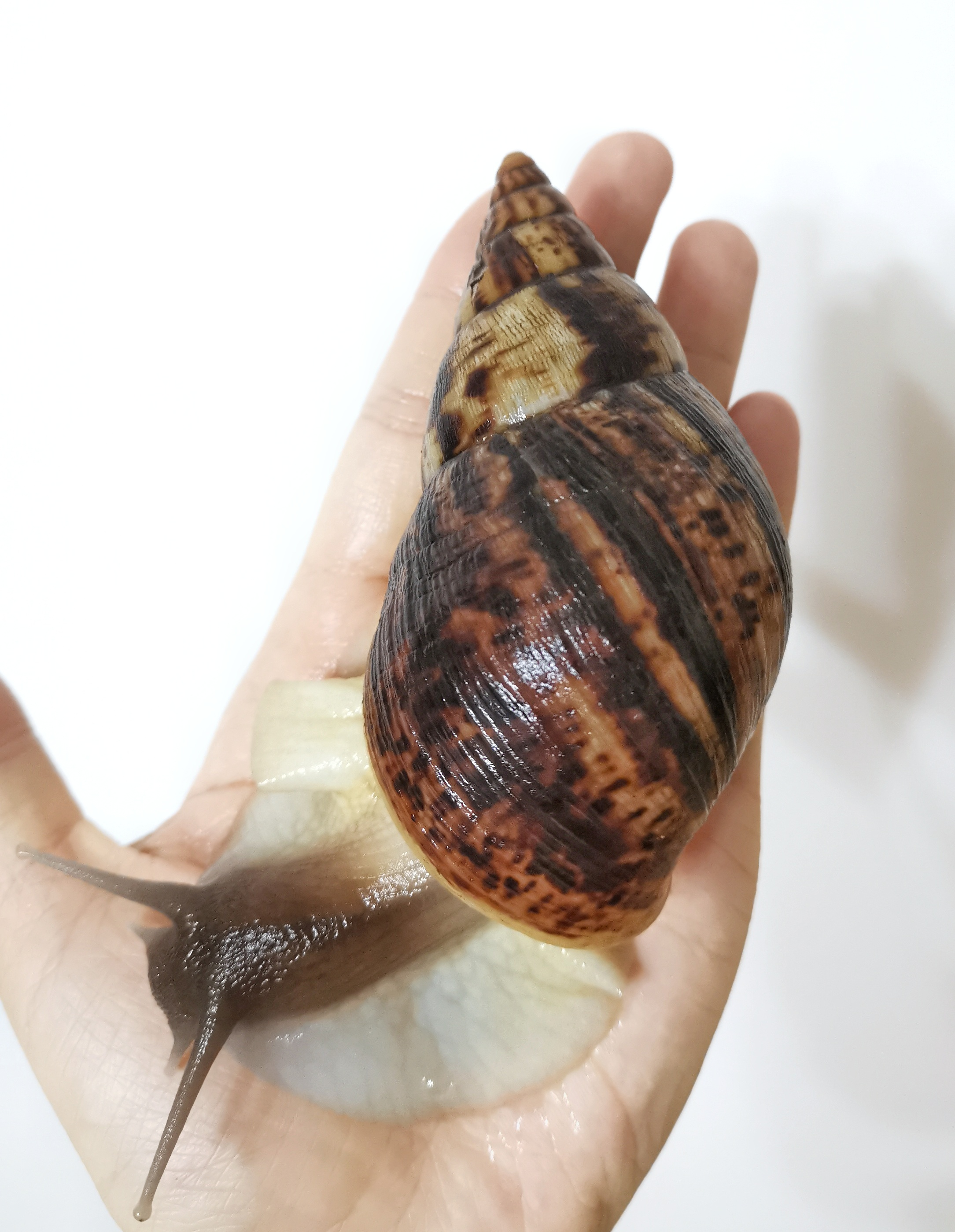

Scientific classification
- Kingdom: Animalia
- Phylum: Mollusca
- Class: Gastropoda
- Order: Stylommatophora
- Superfamily: Achatinoidea
- Family: Achatinidae
- Genus: Lissachatina
- Species: L. reticulata

Binomial name
- Lissachatina reticulata (Pfeiffer, 1845)

Synonyms
- Lissachatina reticulata L. Pfeiffer, 1845 (superseded combination); Lissachatina reticulata L. Pfeiffer, 1845 (original combination)

= Lissachatina reticulata =

Species of snail

Lissachatina reticulata is a species of air-breathing land snail, a terrestrial pulmonate gastropod mollusc in the family Achatinidae, the giant African snails.

== Description ==
Adults are large (shell roughly 10–18 cm long by 5 cm wide, body up to 17 cm) with a distinct reticulated (ridged) shell that is the species' namesake. Shell colouring varies with brown, orange, and yellow streaks and tends to occur in roughly vertical banding. There is also dark speckling present, more visible in the lighter streaks. The flesh can be a soft brown with a dark head, or a slightly translucent milky yellow in albino individuals.

== Diet ==
They eat leaves, fruits and vegetables, faeces and occasionally dead animals or insects.

== Reproduction ==
This species is hermaphroditic, and individuals possess both male and female sex organs but cannot self fertilise. They are not known to hybridize with other snail species. It produces eggs with a diameter of 4-5mm in clutches of up to around 350 eggs when in ideal conditions, and can store sperm from partners for many years, producing multiple batches of viable eggs from one mating. They can live up to 5 years, but on average survive 3–4 years.

== Social behaviour ==
They are not observed to be obligatorily social animals but will gather to rest and mate, and are not actively aggressive to other individuals. Adults may pose a danger to hatchlings by walking over them or knocking them off surfaces in captivity, and smaller snails may rasp on larger ones shells for calcium, weakening and discolouring the others' shell over time.

== History ==
It was originally described as Achatina reticulata, reclassified as Achatina (lissachatina) reticulata, and recently placed in the genus Lissachatina.

== Habitat ==
The native distribution of Lissachatina reticulata includes the coastal region of Zanzibar. The species is also present in other countries such as Nigeria, as a moderate invasive species brought to the area by human interaction.

== As pets ==
Through human interaction, they have also become popular as pets. The recommended captivity temperature is 23–27 Celsius, and they are active in 70-80% humidity.
