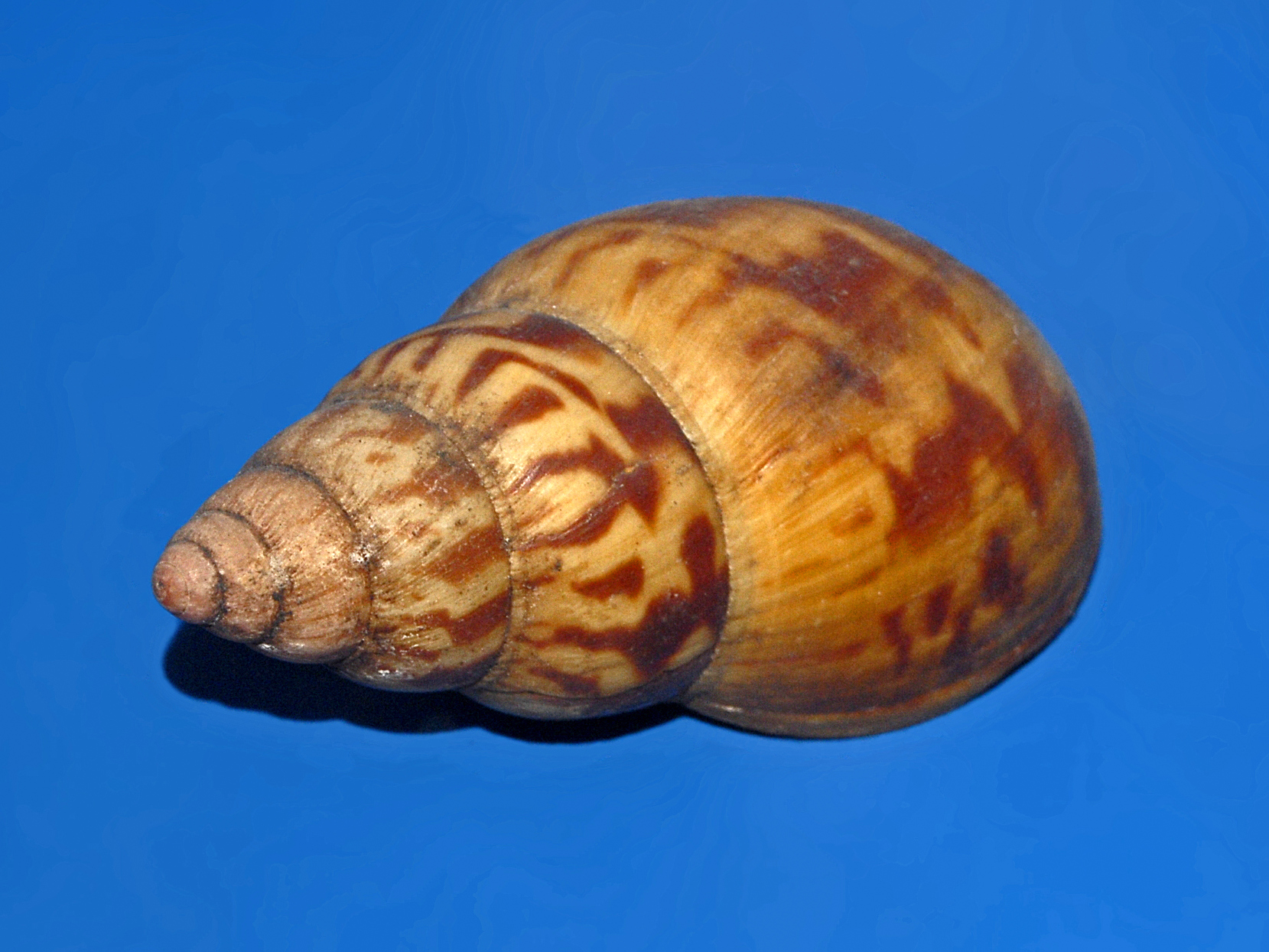
- Shell of Achatina tincta at the Museo Civico di Storia Naturale di Milano

Scientific classification
- Kingdom: Animalia
- Phylum: Mollusca
- Class: Gastropoda
- Order: Stylommatophora
- Family: Achatinidae
- Genus: Achatina
- Species: A. tincta

Binomial name
- Achatina tincta Reeve, 1842

= Achatina tincta =

Species of gastropod

Achatina tincta is a species of large air-breathing land snail, a terrestrial pulmonate gastropod mollusk in the family Achatinidae, the giant African snails.

== Distribution ==
This species is endemic to the Democratic Republic of the Congo and Angola.
