= Giant African land snail =

Giant African land snail is the common name of several species within the family Achatinidae, a family of unusually large African terrestrial snails:

- Achatina achatina, also known as the agate snail or Ghana tiger snail
- Lissachatina fulica, a serious agricultural pest in some countries
- Archachatina marginata
