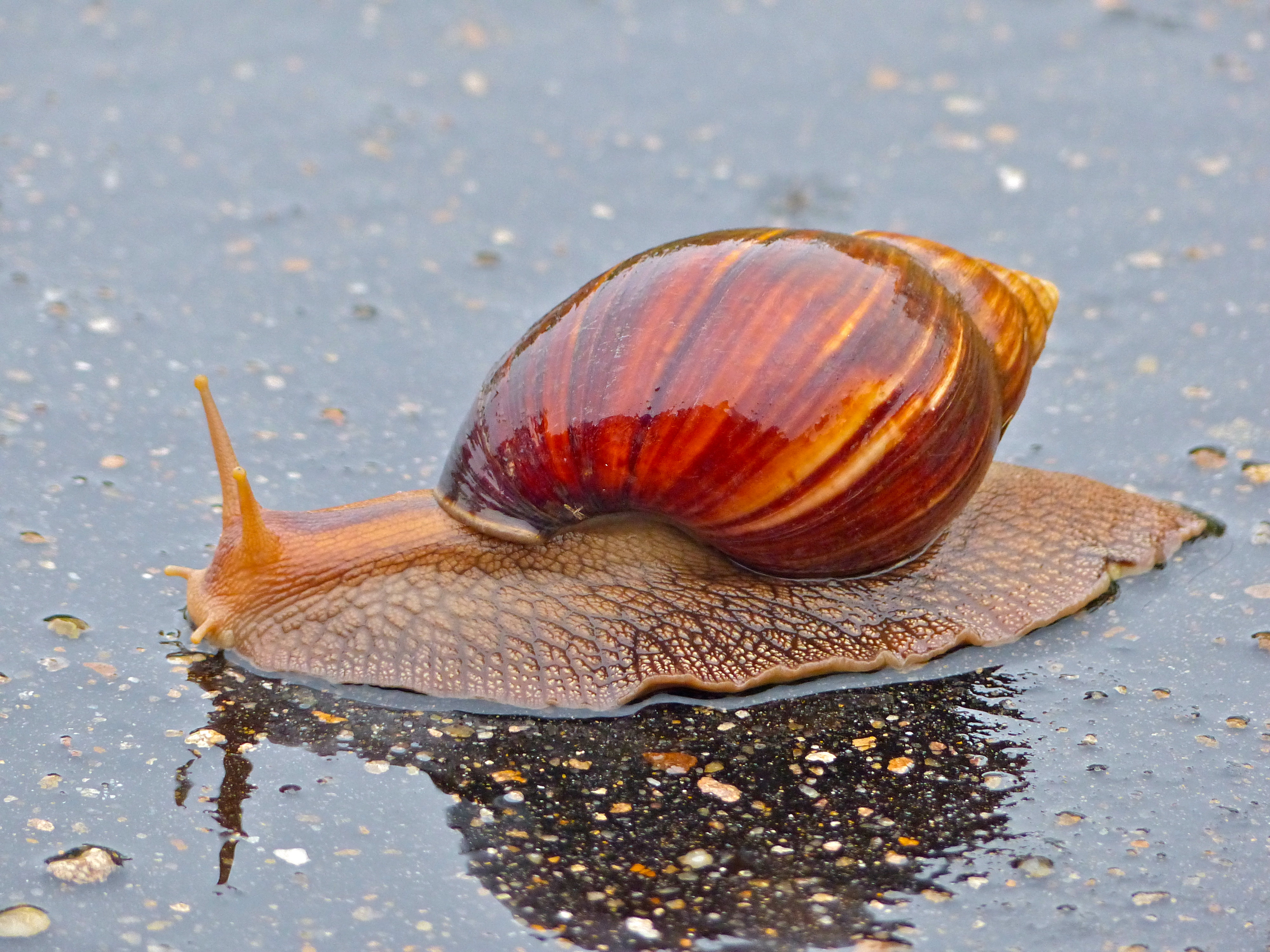

Scientific classification
- Kingdom: Animalia
- Phylum: Mollusca
- Class: Gastropoda
- Order: Stylommatophora
- Superfamily: Achatinoidea
- Family: Achatinidae
- Genus: Lissachatina
- Species: L. immaculata

Binomial name
- Lissachatina immaculata (Lamarck, 1822)

Synonyms
- Achatina (Lissachatina) immaculata Lamarck, 1822 (superseded combination); Achatina (Lissachatina) mulanjensis Crowley & Pain, 1981 accepted, alternate representation; Achatina antourtourensis Crosse, 1879 (junior synonym); Achatina immaculata Lamarck, 1822 (superseded combination); Achatina lamarckiana L. Pfeiffer, 1847 (junior synonym); Achatina lechaptoisi Ancey, 1894 (junior synonym); Achatina mossambica Brancsik, 1893 (junior synonym); Achatina mulanjensis Crowley & Pain, 1981 (junior synonym); Achatina panthera Férussac, 1832 (junior synonym); Achatina panthera var. berevoensis Clench & Archer, 1930 (junior synonym); Achatina panthera var. minor Junod, 1899 (junior synonym); Helix (Cochlitoma) panthera Férussac, 1821 (nomen nudum)

= Lissachatina immaculata =

Species of gastropod

Lissachatina immaculata is a species of very large, air-breathing land snail, a terrestrial pulmonate gastropod mollusk in the family Achatinidae.

Usually grows to 12–15 cm.

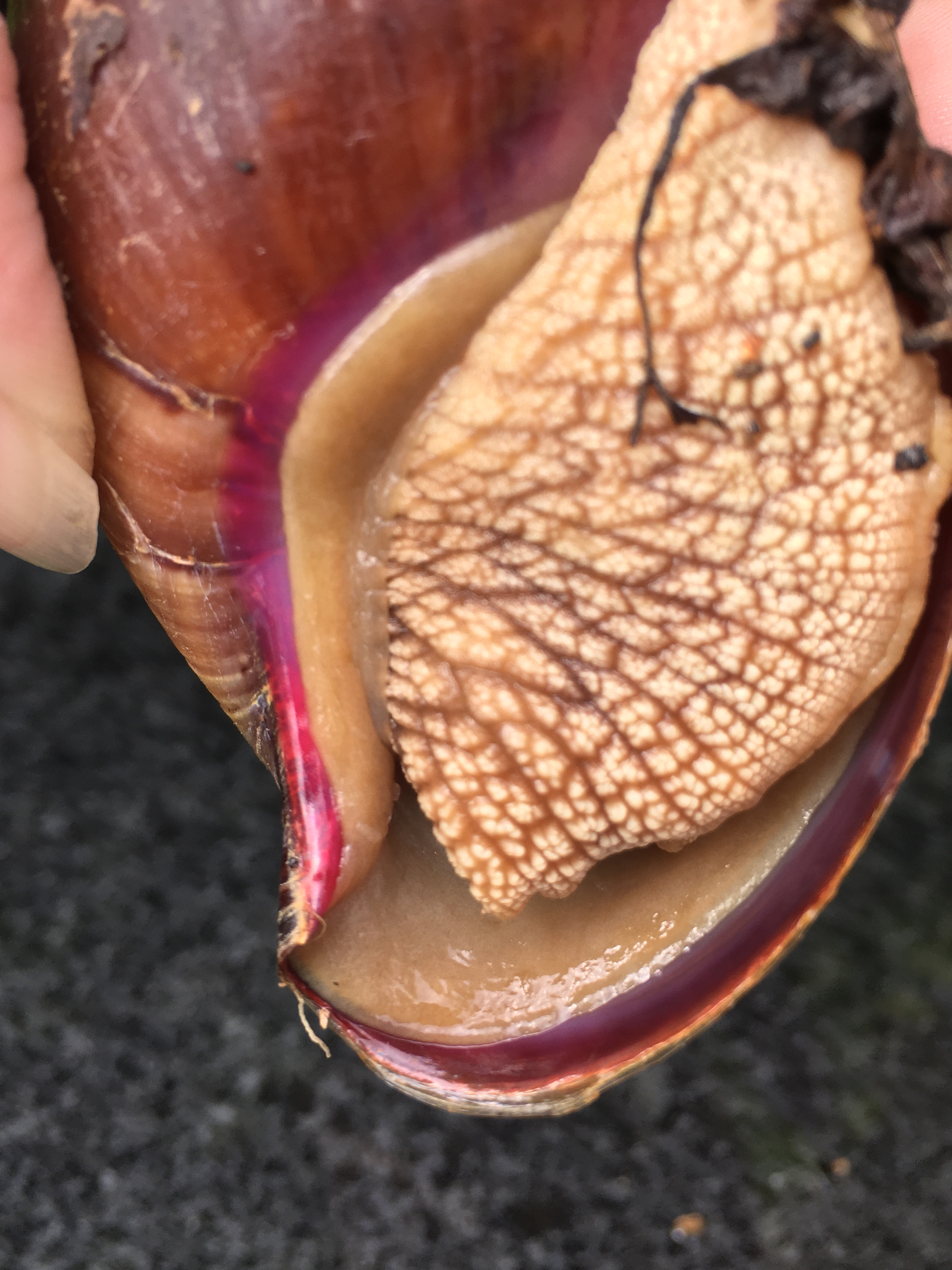
Columella of Lissachatina immaculata

== Distribution ==
This species occurs in Southeastern Africa

As a invasive species:

- China
- French Guiana
- Suriname
- Singapore

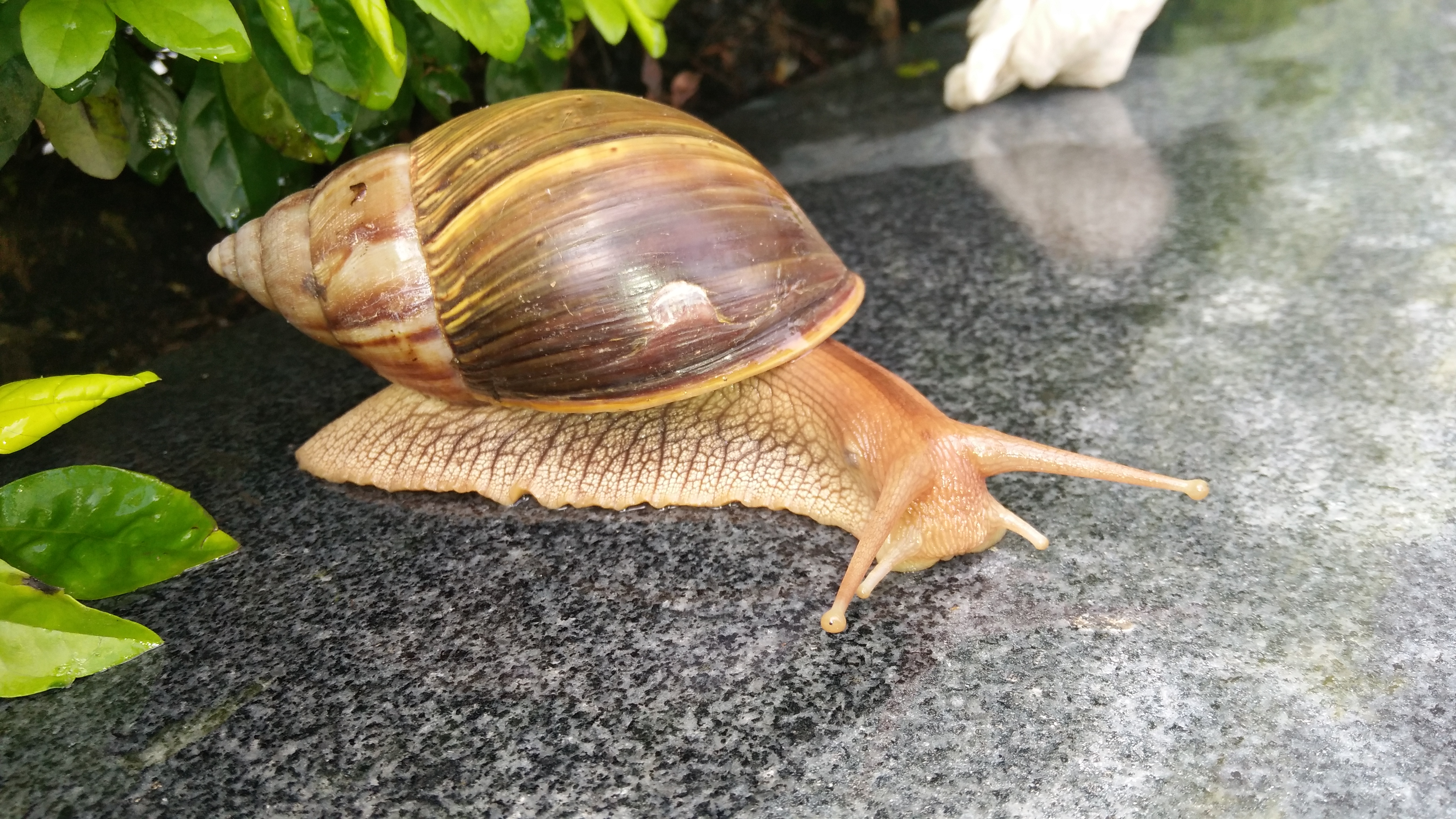
Lissachatina immaculata in China

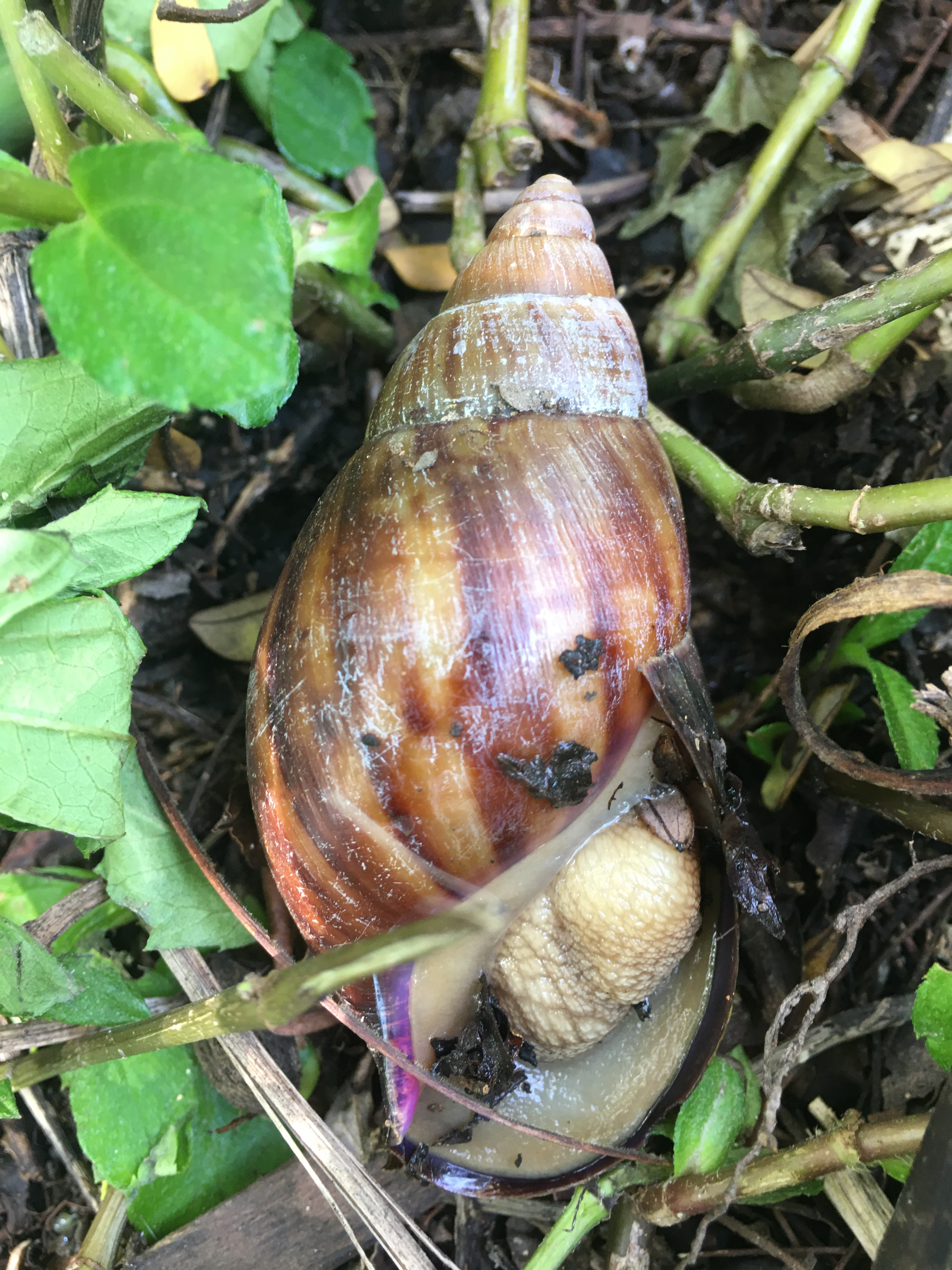
Lissachatina immaculata in China
