= Afropisidium pirothi =

Scientific classification
- Domain: Eukaryota
- Kingdom: Animalia
- Phylum: Mollusca
- Class: Bivalvia
- Order: Sphaeriida
- Family: Sphaeriidae
- Genus: Afropisidium
- Species: A. pirothi

Binomial name
- Afropisidium pirothi (Jickeli, 1881)

Synonyms
- Pisidium pirothi Jickeli, 1881

Species of bivalve

Afropisidium pirothi is a species of bivalve belonging to the family Sphaeriidae.

The species is found in Africa.
