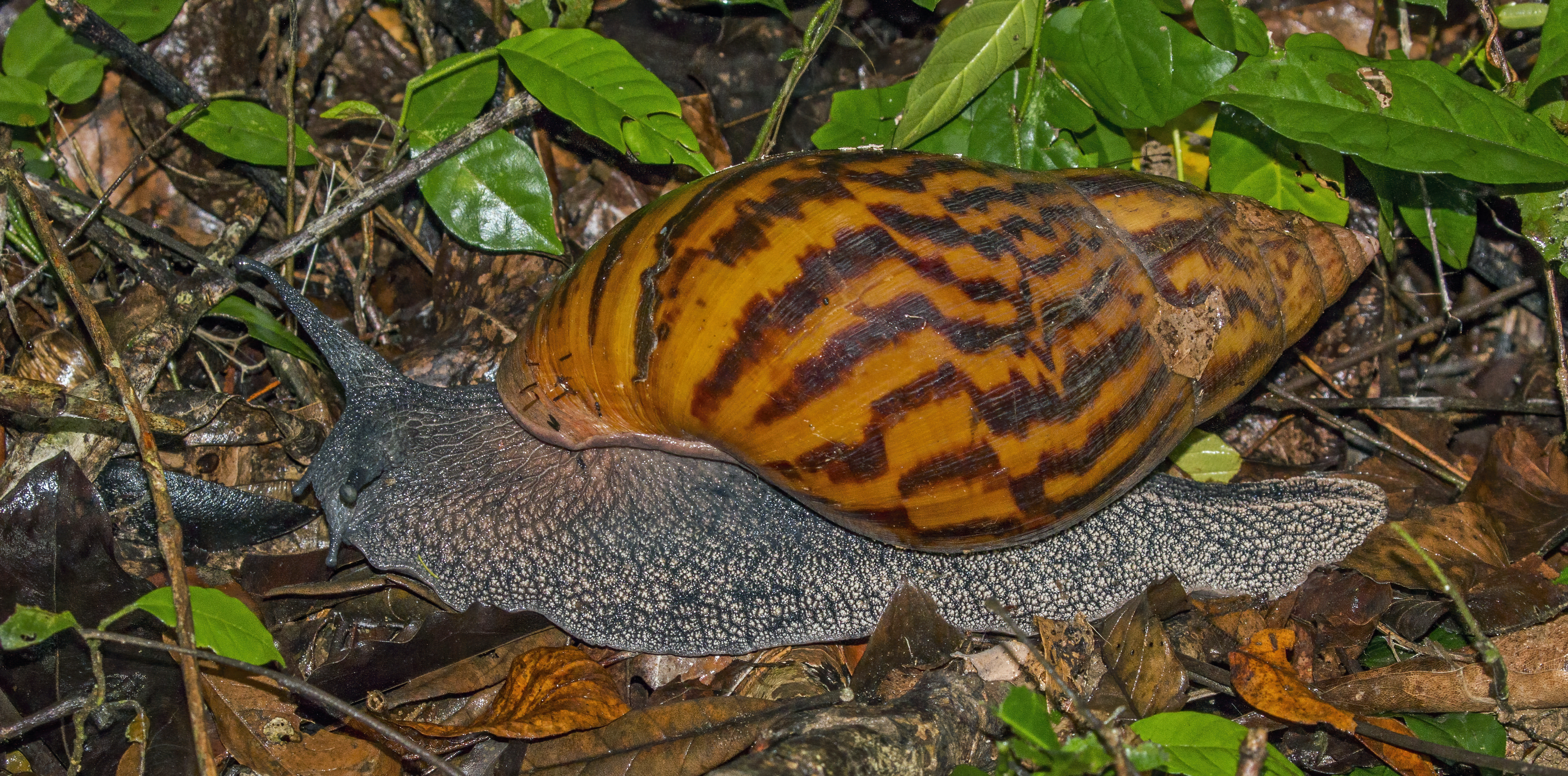
- Kakum National Park, Ghana

Scientific classification
- Kingdom: Animalia
- Phylum: Mollusca
- Class: Gastropoda
- Order: Stylommatophora
- Family: Achatinidae
- Genus: Achatina
- Species: A. achatina

Binomial name
- Achatina achatina (Linnaeus, 1758)

Synonyms
- Achatina (Achatina) achatina (Linnaeus, 1758) · alternate representation; Achatina amphora H. Beck, 1837 (junior synonym); Achatina perdix Lamarck, 1822 (junior synonym); Achatina variegata Lamarck, 1801 (junior synonym); Ampulla bombarda Röding, 1798 (junior synonym); Ampulla flammea Röding, 1798 (junior synonym); Ampulla lacteae Röding, 1798 (junior synonym); Buccinum achatinum (Linnaeus, 1758) superseded combination; Bulla achatina Linnaeus, 1758 (original combination)

= Achatina achatina =

Giant African land snail, invasive pest

Achatina achatina, commonly known as the giant African snail, also known as the giant tiger land snail, is a species of large, air-breathing land snail, a terrestrial pulmonate gastropod mollusk in the family Achatinidae. The name "Achatina" is from "achates", Greek for agate. It shares the common name "giant African snail" with other species of snails such as Lissachatina fulica and Archachatina marginata.

== Subspecies ==
- Achatina achatina achatina (Linnaeus, 1758)
- Achatina achatina bayoli Morelet, 1888
- Achatina achatina depravata Bequaert, 1950
- Achatina achatina elegans (Link, 1807)
- Achatina achatina monochromatica Pilsbry, 1904
- Achatina achatina roseolabiata Bequaert, 1950
- Achatina achatina togoensis Bequaert & Clench, 1934

== Distribution ==
The species is believed to be native to West Africa, within 160 kilometres (99 miles) to 300 kilometres (190 miles) of the coasts off Sierra Leone, Liberia, Ivory Coast, Togo, Benin, Ghana, and Nigeria.

Achatina achatina is routinely confiscated by quarantine authorities at United States airports, especially in Baltimore, Dulles International Airport in Washington, D.C., John F. Kennedy International Airport in New York, and San Francisco. These large snails are kept as pets in the Western world, where owners prize their large size, distinctive markings, and rarity.

It has been suggested that these species be given top national quarantine significance in the United States.

== Description ==
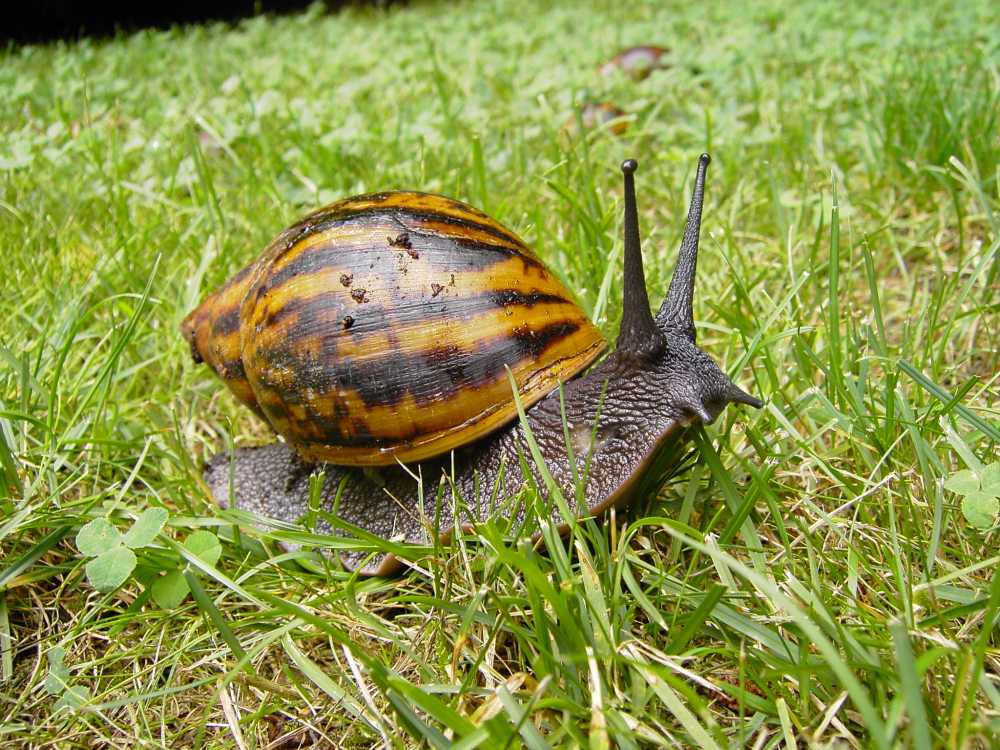
A snail crawling across grass

The shells of these snails often grow to a length of 18 centimetres (7.1 in) with a diameter of 9 centimetres (3.5 in). Certain examples have been surveyed in the wild at 30×15 cm, making them the largest extant land snail species known.

Similar to other giant land snails such as L. fulica, A. achatina are herbivores. Their diets consist of many plants such as nuts, flowers, fruit, stems, and leaves. Achatina achatina have also been known to eat farmers' crops including cocoa, peanuts, bananas, and cauliflower.

In other instances, the giant African land snail has been known to eat smaller invertebrates in order to reach their desired calcium and protein intake needed for survival. Such insects include ants, small worms, beetles, and smaller snails.

== Ecology ==
Like almost all pulmonate gastropods, these snails are hermaphrodites, having male and female sex organs. Each snail lays up to 1200 eggs per year. Achatina achatina is an important source of animal protein for West African forest-dwelling ethnic groups, and there is potential for commercial farming.

This species' substantial size and potential for rapid population growth can make the snail a serious pest when introduced to non-native ecosystems. The population size of this species can be curtailed through disease caused by the bacterium Aeromonas hydrophila but it often has no other natural enemies.
