= List of non-marine molluscs of Hong Kong =

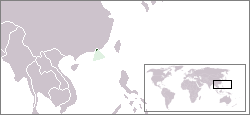
Location of Hong Kong

The non-marine mollusks of Hong Kong are a part of the molluscan fauna of Hong Kong. A number of species of non-marine mollusks are found in the wild in Hong Kong.

== Freshwater gastropods ==
Thiaridae

- Brotia hainanensis (Brot, 1872)

== Land gastropods ==
Cycloneritida

- Helicinidae
  - Aphanoconia
    - Aphanoconia hungerfordiana

Architaenioglossa

- Cyclophoridae
  - Cyclophorus
    - Cyclophorus punctatus
    - Cyclophorus exaltatus
  - Lagocheilus
    - Lagocheilus hungerfordianus
    - Lagocheilus pellicosta
  - Scabrina
    - Scabrina sp.
  - Cyclotus
    - Cyclotus chinensis
  - Dioryx
    - Dioryx pilula
  - Metalycaeus
    - Metalycaeus latecostatus
- Pupinidae
  - Tylotoechus
    - Tylotoechus pulchellus (=Pupina pulchella)
- Diplommatinidae
  - Diplommatina
    - Diplommatina paxillus
    - Diplommatina tantilla

Stylommatophora

- Achatinidae
  - Lissachatina
    - Lissachatina fulica (=Achatina fulica)
    - Lissachatina immaculata (=Achatina immaculata)
  - Subulina
    - Subulina octona
  - Allopeas
    - Allopeas gracile (=Opeas gracile)
    - Allopeas clavulinum (=Opeas clavulinum)
  - Paropeas
    - Paropeas achatinaceum
  - Opeas
    - Opeas pyrgula (=Opeas pyrgula)
    - Opeas sp.
  - Tortaxis
    - Tortaxis sp.
- Streptaxidae
  - Haploptychius
    - Haploptychius sinensis
  - Gulella
    - Gulella bicolor
- Diapheridae
  - Parasinoennea
    - Parasinoennea splendens (=Sinoennea splendens)
- Camaenidae
  - Camaena
    - Camaena cicatricosa
    - Camaena xanthoderma
  - Moellendorffia
    - Moellendorffia trisinuata
  - Trichochloritis
    - Trichochloritis hungerfordiana (=Chloritis hungerfordiana)
  - Bradybaena
    - Bradybaena similaris
  - Satsuma
    - Satsuma meridionalis
  - Aegista
    - Aegista gerlachi
    - Aegista subconella
- Gastrocoptidae
  - Gastrocopta
    - Gastrocopta meridionalis
- Achatinellidae
  - Tornatellides
    - Tornatellides boeningi
- Enidae
  - Apoecus
    - Apoecus albescens
- Clausiliidae
  - Tauphaedusa
    - Tauphaedusa broderseni (=Euphaedusa broderseni)
  - Papilliphaedusa
    - Papilliphaedusa lorraini (=Euphaedusa lorraini)
    - Papilliphaedusa porphyrea (=Euphaedusa porphyrea)
- Plectopylidae
  - Gudeodiscus
    - Gudeodiscus pulvinaris
- Succineidae
  - Succinea
    - Succinea arundinetorum
  - Neosuccinea
    - Neosuccinea chinensis
- Ariophantidae
  - Megaustenia
    - Megaustenia imperator (=Cryptosoma imperator)
  - Tanychlamys
    - Tanychlamys superlita
    - Tanychlamys nitidissima
    - Tanychlamys discus
  - Microcystina
    - Microcystina schmackeriana
  - Parmarion
    - Parmarion martensi
    - Parmarion? sinensis
- Helicarionidae
  - Sitala
    - Sitala trochula (=Sitalina trochula)
- Chronidae
  - Kaliella
    - Kaliella depressa
    - Kaliella hongkongensis
- Philomycidae
  - Meghimatium
    - Meghimatium bilineatum
    - Meghimatium pictum
    - Meghimatium sp.

Systellommatophora

- Veronicellidae
  - Valiguna
    - Valiguna siamensis (=Semperula siamensis)
  - Laevicaulis
    - Laevicaulis alte
    - Laevicaulis haroldi

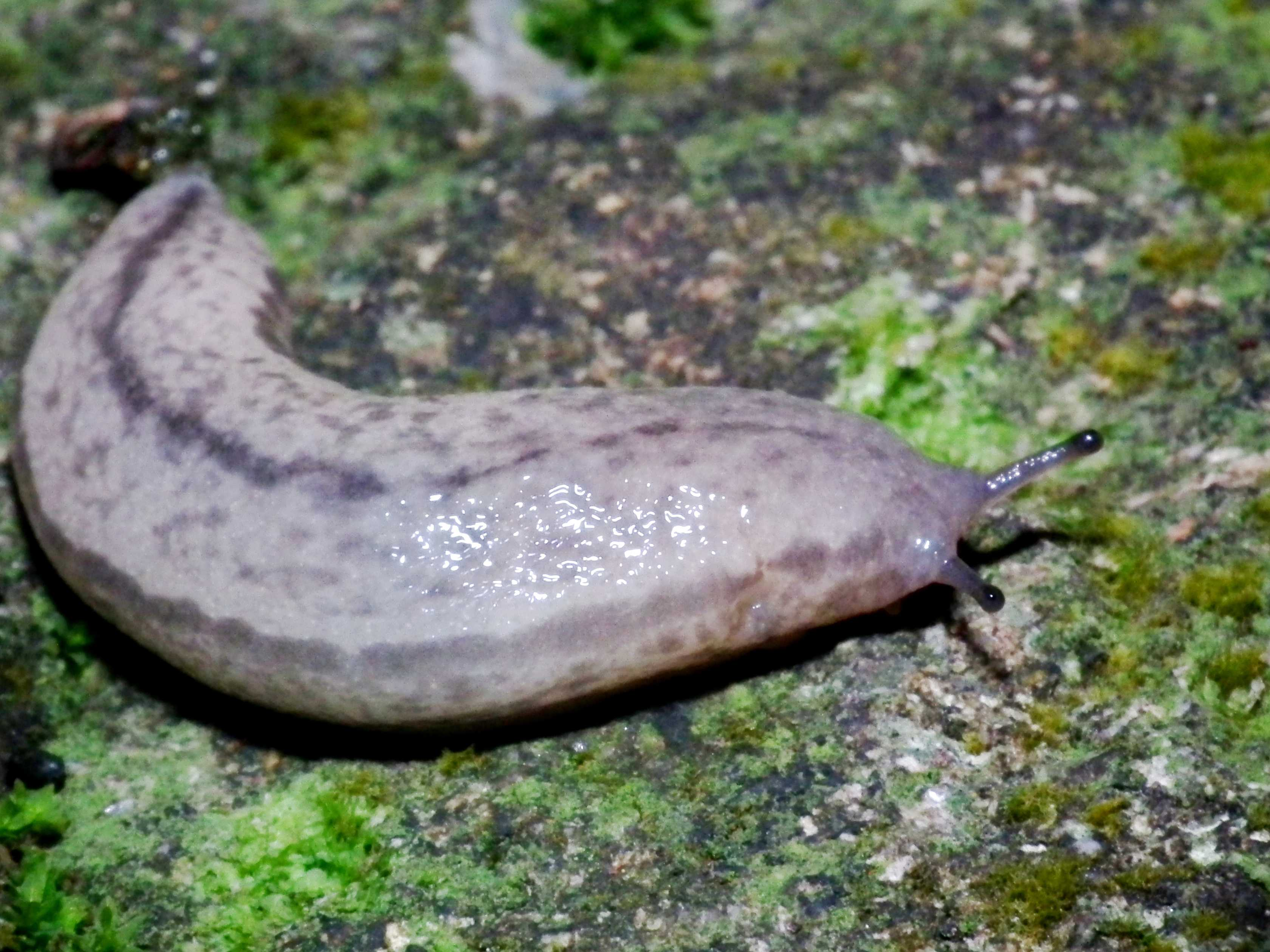
An unidentified philomycid slug from Hong Kong

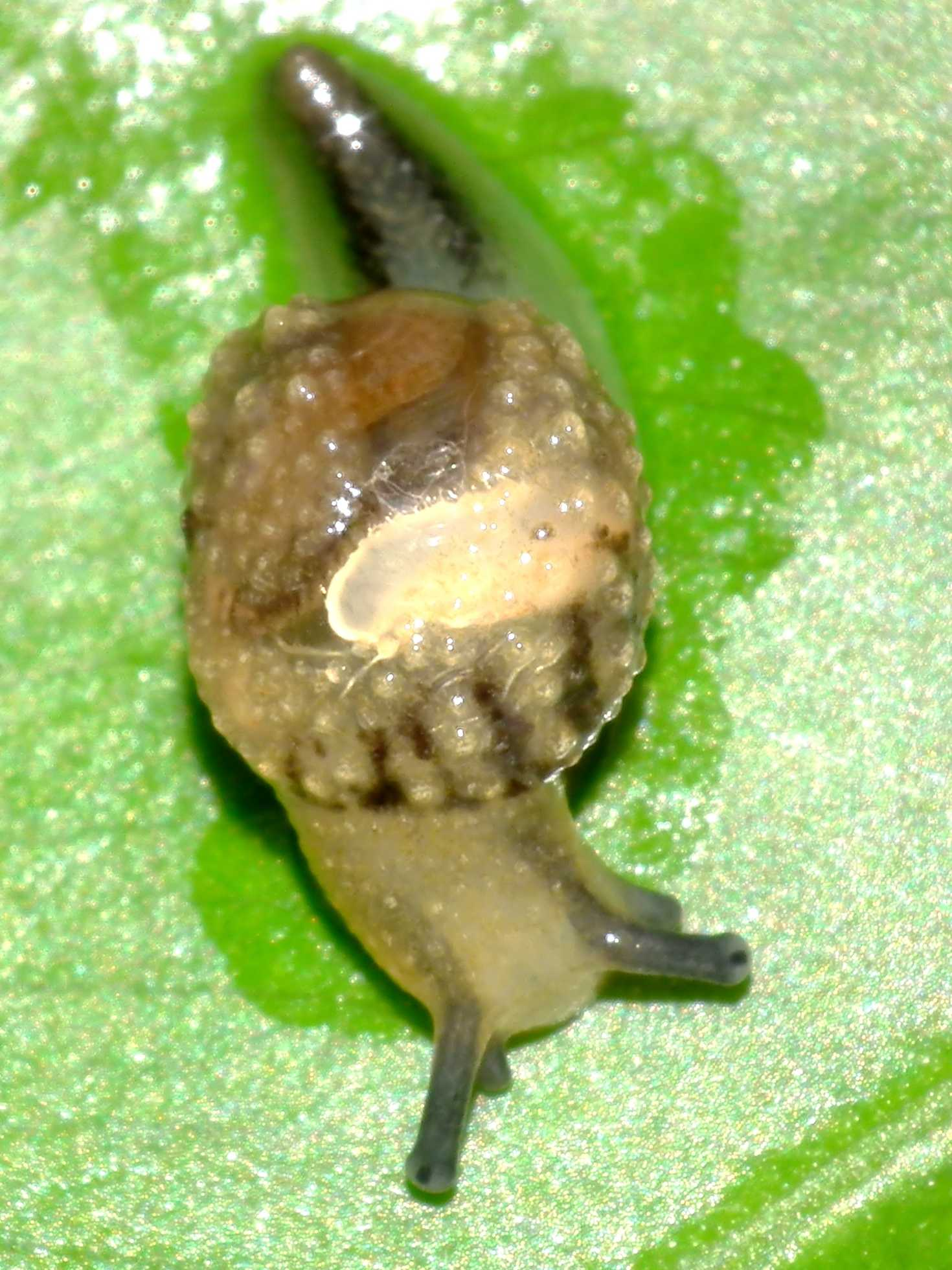
An unidentified semislug from Hong Kong

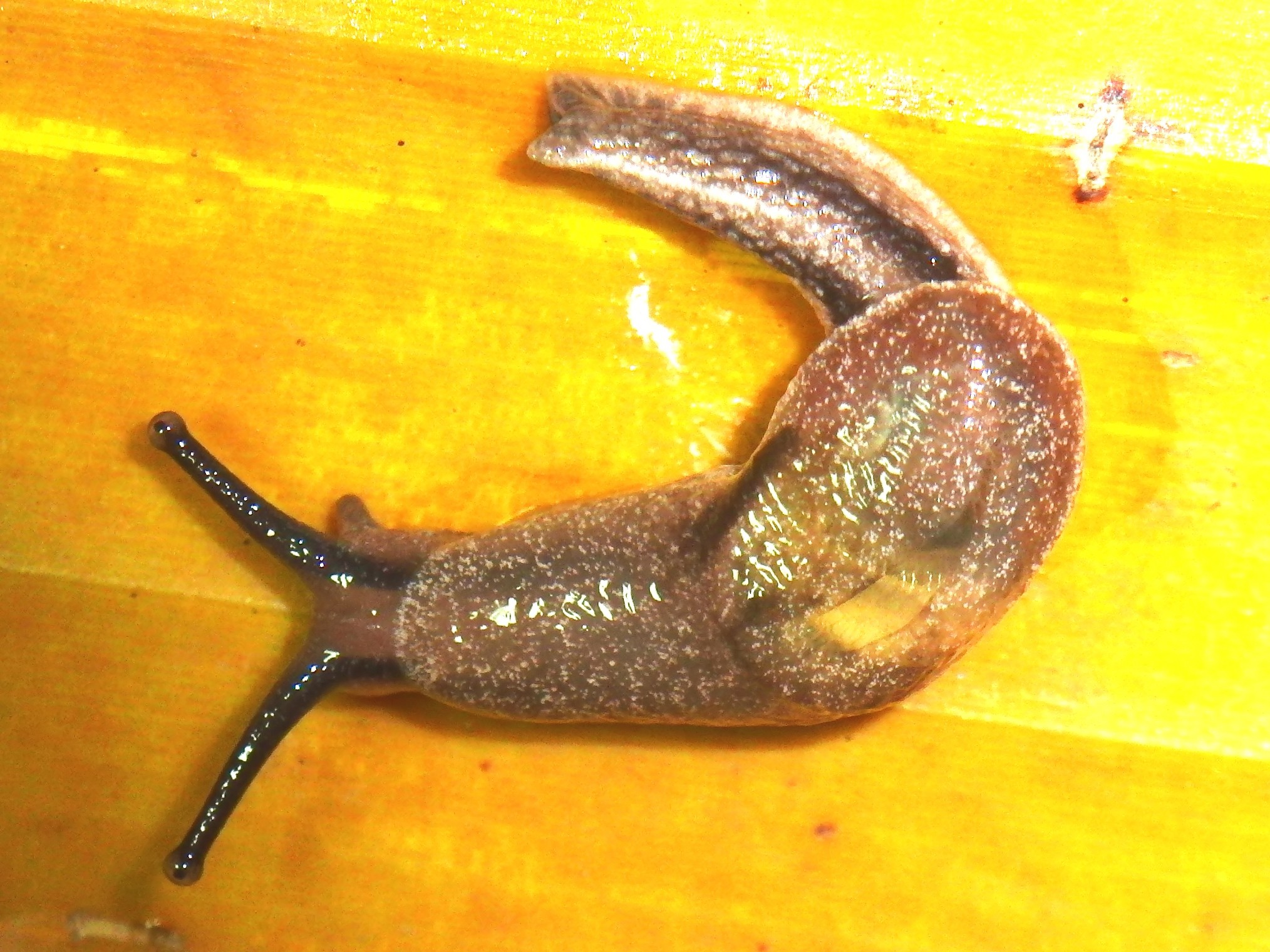
A species of Parmarion from Hong Kong

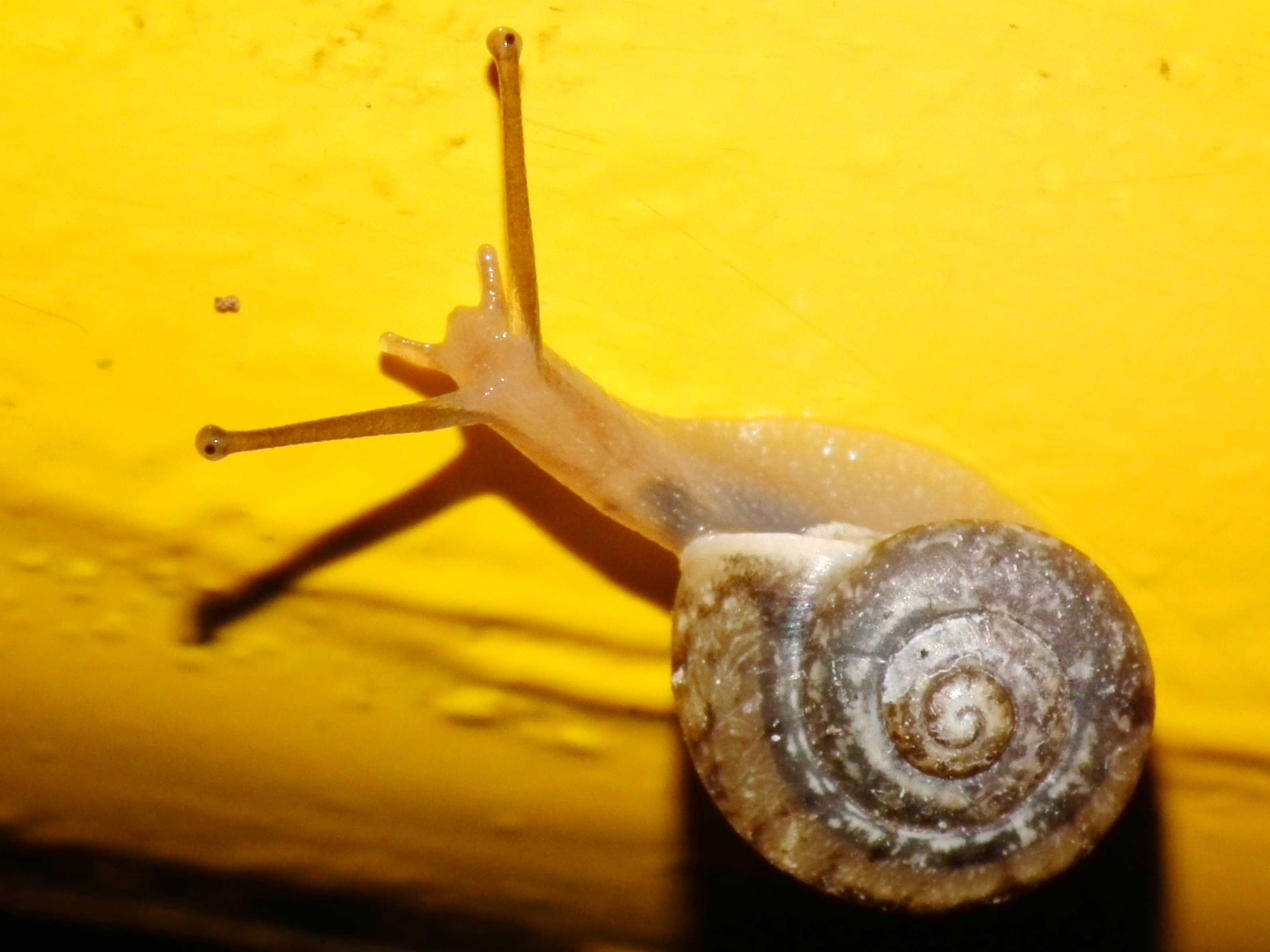
An unidentified land snail from Hong Kong

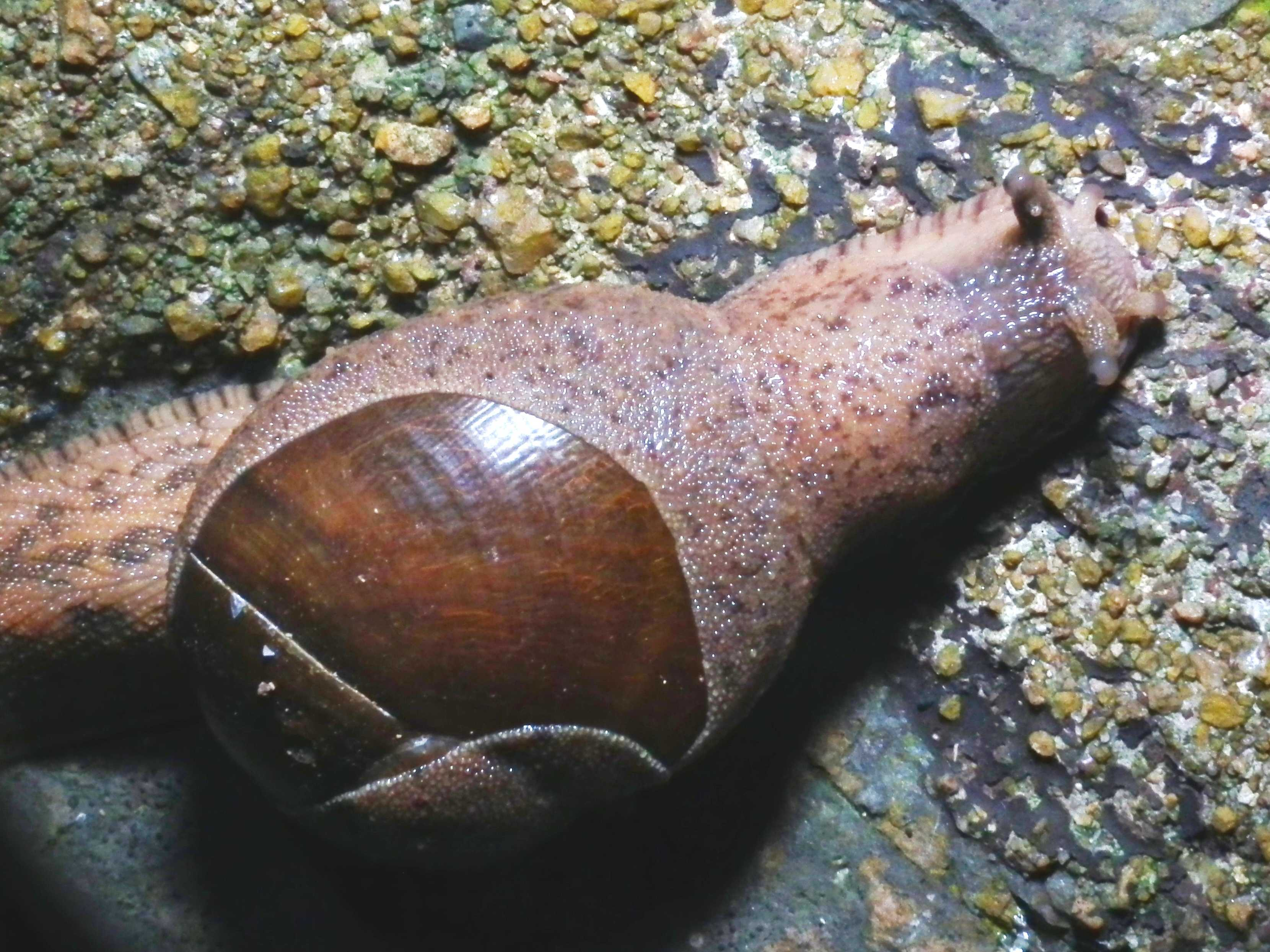
An ariophantid land snail from Hong Kong

== See also ==
- Environment of Hong Kong
- Conservation in Hong Kong
- List of marine molluscs of Hong Kong

Lists of molluscs of China and surrounding countries:

- List of non-marine molluscs of China
- List of non-marine molluscs of Taiwan
- List of non-marine molluscs of the Philippines
