= Allopeas cavernicola =

Scientific classification
- Domain: Eukaryota
- Kingdom: Animalia
- Phylum: Mollusca
- Class: Gastropoda
- Order: Stylommatophora
- Suborder: Achatinina
- Superfamily: Achatinoidea
- Family: Achatinidae
- Genus: Allopeas
- Species: A. cavernicola

Binomial name
- Allopeas cavernicola (Annandale & Chopra, 1924)

Synonyms
- Lamellaxis (Allopeas) vernicola (Annandale & Chopra, 1924) (unaccepted combination); Opeas cavernicola Annandale & Chopra, 1924 superseded combination; Opeas cavernicola var. vamana Annandale & Chopra, 1924 junior subjective synonym

Species of gastropod

Allopeas cavernicola is a species of small, tropical, air-breathing land snail, a terrestrial pulmonate gastropod mollusk in the family Achatinidae.

== Description ==
The troglomorphic gastropod, Allopeas cavernicola was described as a new species based on specimens collected from Siju Cave in 1922. It was described as being “closely allied” to the “widely distributed” surface snail Allopeas gracile, but differed in terms of shell morphology and in having distinctly reduced eyes. A search in the same cave in 2019 found no living specimens.

== Distribution ==
This species occurs in India.
