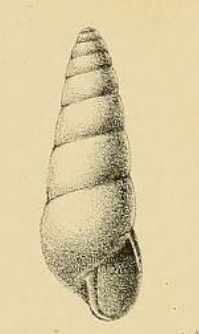
- Shell of Allopeas prestoni (holotype)

Scientific classification
- Kingdom: Animalia
- Phylum: Mollusca
- Class: Gastropoda
- Order: Stylommatophora
- Family: Achatinidae
- Genus: Allopeas
- Species: A. prestoni

Binomial name
- Allopeas prestoni (Sykes, 1898)

Synonyms
- Opeas prestoni Sykes, 1898 (original combination)

= Allopeas prestoni =

Species of gastropod

Allopeas prestoni is a species of small, tropical, air-breathing land snail, a terrestrial pulmonate gastropod mollusk in the family Achatinidae.

Variety

- Allopeas prestoni var. hawaiiense (Sykes, 1904): synonym of Allopeas clavulinum (Potiez & Michaud, 1838) (junior subjective synonym)

== Description ==
The length of the shell attains 11 mm, its diameter 3.25 mm.

(Original description in Latin) The slightly perforate and elongate-cylindrical shell is translucent, thin, and exhibits a horny or waxy-horny coloration. The protoconch is somewhat blunt. The shell comprises 8.5 flatly convex whorls, delicately striated with growth lines. The body whorl accounts for 9/20 of the total shell length. The suture is distinctly impressed. The aperture is elongate-ovate in shape. The peristome is simple and sharp, with the columellar margin slightly reflexed at the base, nearly covering the perforation.

== Distribution ==
The distribution of Allopeas prestoni includes:

- Sri Lanka.
