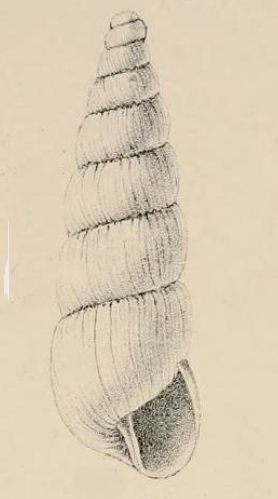
- Shell of Allopeas sykesi (holotype)

Scientific classification
- Kingdom: Animalia
- Phylum: Mollusca
- Class: Gastropoda
- Order: Stylommatophora
- Family: Achatinidae
- Genus: Allopeas
- Species: A. sykesi

Binomial name
- Allopeas sykesi (Pilsbry, 1906)

Synonyms
- Opeas sykesi Pilsbry, 1906

= Allopeas sykesi =

Species of gastropod

Allopeas sykesi is a species of small, tropical, air-breathing land snail, a terrestrial pulmonate gastropod mollusk in the family Achatinidae.

== Description ==
The length of the shell attains 12.9 mm, its diameter 3.5 mm.

(Original description) The shell is perforate, resembling Allopeas gracile in its sculptural pattern but with significantly shorter, more compactly coiled whorls, resulting in a greater number of whorls in shells of equivalent length.

The spire tapers straight and uniformly to a small protoconch. The shell typically consists of 8.5 to 10 whorls, with the initial 1.5 embryonic whorls being smooth except for a subtle subsutural radial striation. This striation becomes more pronounced in the post-embryonic whorls, creating a fine, irregularly developed crenulation along the suture, which then smooths out on the lower whorls.

The later whorls are somewhat flattened, and the suture is well-defined and impressed. The aperture is vertical and considerably shorter than in Allopeas gracile. The outer lip is weakly arcuate, with a slight forward arch, while the basal margin is well-rounded. The columella is relatively straight, with its edge reflexed.

== Distribution ==
This species occurs in Sri Lanka.
