= Allopeas mariae =

Scientific classification
- Kingdom: Animalia
- Phylum: Mollusca
- Class: Gastropoda
- Order: Stylommatophora
- Family: Achatinidae
- Genus: Allopeas
- Species: A. mariae

Binomial name
- Allopeas mariae (Jousseaume, 1894)

Synonyms
- Opeas mariae Jousseaume, 1894 (original combination)

Species of gastropod

Allopeas mariae is a species of small, tropical, air-breathing land snail, a terrestrial pulmonate gastropod mollusk in the family Achatinidae.

== Description ==
The length of the shell attains 9 mm, its diameter 2 mm.

(Original description in French) The shell is elongated and turreted, with an obtuse apex and a rounded base. Its surface is covered by a very pale yellow epitheca, which is fairly adherent but partially worn away by friction. The areas where the epitheca is absent are a matte white.

The spire is composed of eight whorls, which develop regularly and slowly. The suture separating them is fairly wide and deep, with an irregularly crenulated appearance. The embryonic whorls, forming a small obtuse apex at the tip of the shell, are smooth. The body whorl, which is very elongated, is adorned with fine, slightly arched striations. The aperture, tilted outward, has the shape of an elongated oval, cut obliquely at the top by the base of the penultimate whorl. On this whorl, a thin layer of coating can be seen, connecting the two ends of the peristome. The lower and outer edges are straight and thin; the former, which describes a rounded curve, becomes slightly angular and almost canaliculate at its junction with the columellar margin. The outer lip, barely curved, is slightly depressed in its upper half, which extends well beyond the lower margin. The columellar margin, nearly straight and thicker than the previous one, widens at the base and flares outward to form the rim of a very small umbilical slit.

== Distribution ==
This species occurs in Sri Lanka.
