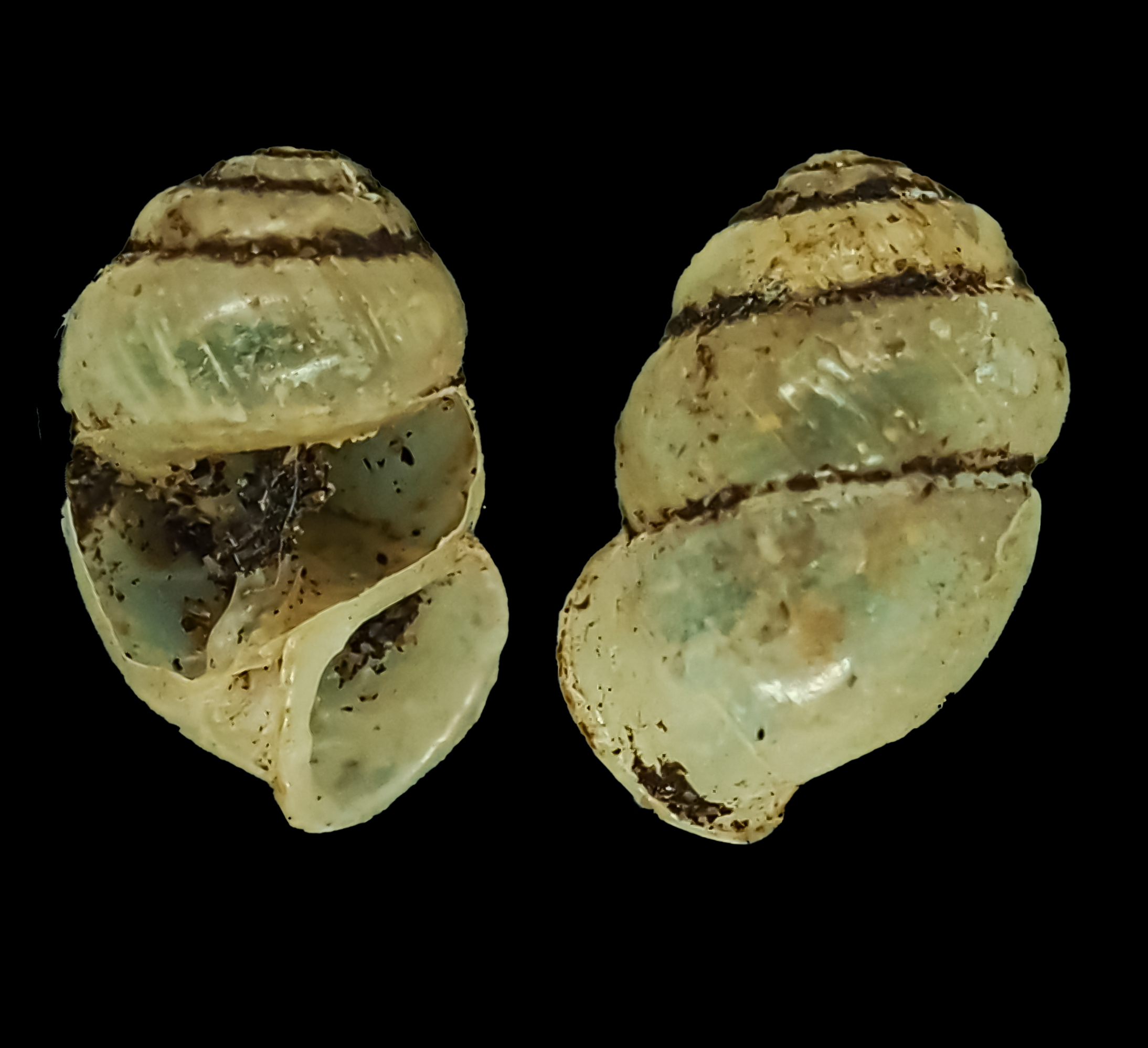
- Shell of Allopeas franzhuberi (holotype at the MNHN, Paris)

Scientific classification
- Kingdom: Animalia
- Phylum: Mollusca
- Class: Gastropoda
- Order: Stylommatophora
- Family: Achatinidae
- Genus: Allopeas
- Species: A. franzhuberi

Binomial name
- Allopeas franzhuberi Thach, 2021

= Allopeas franzhuberi =

Species of gastropod

Allopeas franzhuberi is a species of small, tropical, air-breathing land snail, a terrestrial pulmonate gastropod mollusk in the family Achatinidae.

== Description ==
The length of the shell attains 16.4 mm.

== Distribution ==
This species is found in Laos.
