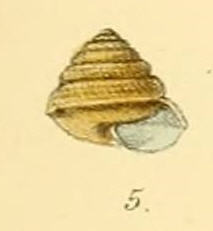
- Drawing of an apertural view of the shell of Sitala palmaria

Scientific classification
- Domain: Eukaryota
- Kingdom: Animalia
- Phylum: Mollusca
- Class: Gastropoda
- Order: Stylommatophora
- Family: Helicarionidae
- Genus: Sitala
- Species: S. palmaria

Binomial name
- Sitala palmaria (Benson, 1864)

Synonyms
- Helix palmaria Benson, 1864

= Sitala palmaria =

Species of gastropod

Sitala palmaria is a species of air-breathing land snail, terrestrial pulmonate gastropod mollusks in the family Helicarionidae.

== Distribution ==
This species occurs in India, and was described from Nandi Hills, India by malacologist William Henry Benson in 1864.
