= Allopeas subula =

Scientific classification
- Kingdom: Animalia
- Phylum: Mollusca
- Class: Gastropoda
- Order: Stylommatophora
- Family: Achatinidae
- Genus: Allopeas
- Species: A. subula

Binomial name
- Allopeas subula (L. Pfeiffer, 1839)
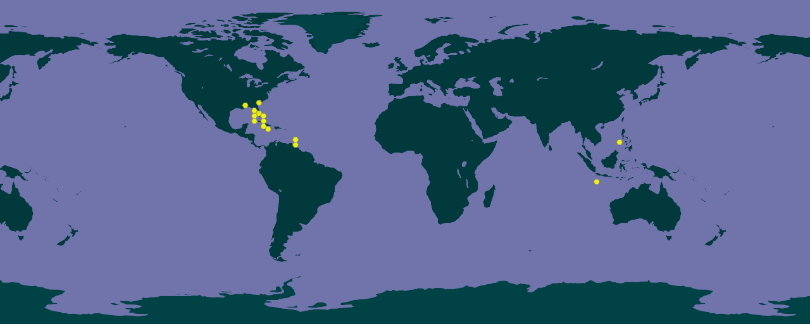

Synonyms
- Achatina subula L. Pfeiffer, 1839 (original combination); Bulimus subula L. Pfeiffer, 1839 (different combination); Opeas subula (L. Pfeiffer, 1839) (unaccepted combination); Stenogyra (Opeas) subula (L. Pfeiffer, 1839) (unaccepted combination); Stenogyra subula (L. Pfeiffer, 1839) (unaccepted combination)

Species of gastropod

Allopeas subula is a species of small, tropical, air-breathing land snail, a terrestrial pulmonate gastropod mollusk in the family Achatinidae.

== Description ==
The length of the shell varies between 4 mm and 5 mm 6 mm, its diameter between 1¼ mm and 1½ mm.

(Original description in Latin) The shell is turreted and subulate, with a translucent, waxy appearance. It features 7 slightly flattened whorls, with the body whorl being subtly perforate. The columella is faintly truncated, the lip is sharp, and the aperture is oblong.

The shell is small, thin, and turreted. It is typically perforate, with a large, rounded, and obtuse apex. The whorls are rather flattened and the shell exhibits a corneous or yellowish hue. The embryonic whorls are smooth. The aperture is small and ovate, with a thin outer lip that is somewhat arched forward. The columella is straight or slightly concave, not sinuous, with the columellar lip reflexed, curving seamlessly into the basal lip without being toothed or truncated below.

== Distribution ==
The distribution of Allopeas subula includes

- Cuba (holotype), Barbados, Bahamas, Jamaica, Guyana, Nicaragua, Mexico
- Christmas Island
- Australia
- Vietnam
