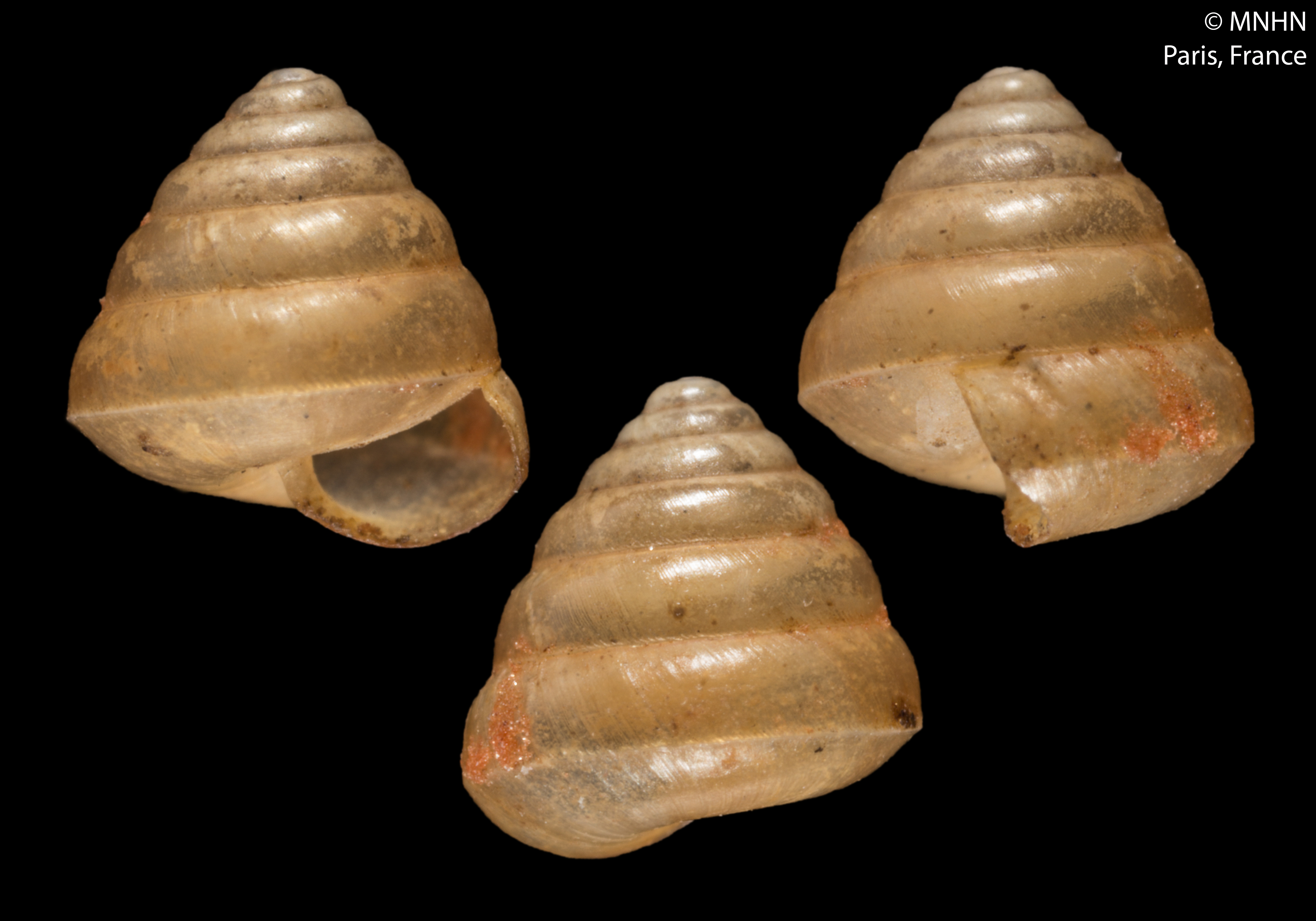
- Shell of Kaliella ordinaria (syntype at MNHN, Paris)

Scientific classification
- Kingdom: Animalia
- Phylum: Mollusca
- Class: Gastropoda
- Order: Stylommatophora
- Infraorder: Limacoidei
- Superfamily: Trochomorphoidea
- Family: Chronidae
- Genus: Kaliella; Blanford, 1863

Type species
- Helix barrakporensis L. Pfeiffer, 1853

Synonyms
- Cavicola Ancey, 1887 (junior synonym); Eclipsena Iredale, 1937 (junior synonym); Gunongia Tillier & Bouchet, 1989; Helix (Kaliella) W. T. Blanford, 1863; Kionghutania Tillier & Bouchet, 1989; Nanina (Kaliella) W. T. Blanford, 1863 (original rank)

= Kaliella =

Genus of gastropods

Kaliella is a genus of air-breathing land snails or semi-slugs, terrestrial pulmonate gastropod mollusks in the family Chronidae.

== Distribution ==
The distribution of the genus Kaliella includes:

- Hong Kong
- Laos
- Vietnam
- Uganda (2 species)
- ...

== Species ==
Species within the genus Kaliella include:

- Kaliella accepta (E. A. Smith, 1895)
- Kaliella ahitsitondronae Salvat, 1966
- Kaliella ammastoma B. Rensch, 1932
- Kaliella animula Godwin-Austen, 1882
- Kaliella aspirans (W. T. Blanford & H. F. Blanford, 1861)
- Kaliella barrakporensis (L. Pfeiffer, 1852)
- Kaliella bhasini Rajagopalaingar, 1953
- Kaliella bhutanensis Godwin-Austen, 1907
- Kaliella bullula (Benson, 1838)
- Kaliella burrailensis Godwin-Austen, 1883
- Kaliella cavicola (Gredler, 1881)
- Kaliella chekiangensis Yen, 1948
- Kaliella chennelli Godwin-Austen, 1883
- Kaliella cherraensis Godwin-Austen, 1882
- Kaliella chondrium Quadras & Möllendorff, 1896
- Kaliella colletti Sykes, 1899
- Kaliella comorensis Fischer-Piette & Vukadinovic, 1974
- Kaliella costata Pilsbry & Hirase, 1905
- Kaliella costigera Möllendorff, 1887
- Kaliella crandalli K. C. Emberton, Slapcinsky, Campbell, Rakotondrazafy, Andriamiarison & J. D. Emberton, 2010
- Kaliella cruda E. A. Smith, 1909
- Kaliella delectabilis Sykes, 1898
- Kaliella dendrobates (Tillier & Bouchet, 1989)
- Kaliella dendrophila (van Benthem Jutting, 1950)
- Kaliella dentifera Quadras & Möllendorff, 1894
- Kaliella depauperata Preston, 1912
- Kaliella depressa Möllendorff, 1883
- Kaliella difficilis Möllendorff, 1900
- Kaliella dikrangensis Godwin-Austen, 1883
- Kaliella ditropis (Quadras & Möllendorff, 1894)
- Kaliella dolichoconus Möllendorff, 1901
- Kaliella doliolum (L. Pfeiffer, 1846)
- Kaliella dorri (Wattebled, 1886)
- Kaliella elongata Godwin-Austen, 1882
- Kaliella euconuloides Melvill & Ponsonby, 1908
- Kaliella euconus Möllendorff, 1899
- Kaliella eurytrochus Vermeulen, Liew & Schilthuizen, 2015
- Kaliella fastigiata (T. Hutton, 1838)
- Kaliella flatura Godwin-Austen, 1882
- Kaliella fourneauxensis Godwin-Austen, 1908
- Kaliella franciscana (Gredler, 1881)
- Kaliella gradata Möllendorff, 1901
- Kaliella gratiosa Godwin-Austen, 1882
- Kaliella gregaria (Tillier & Bouchet, 1989)
- Kaliella hongkongensis Möllendorff, 1883
- Kaliella humilis (Tillier & Bouchet, 1989)
- Kaliella infantilis (E. A. Smith, 1895)
- Kaliella iredalei Preston, 1912
- Kaliella jaintiaca Godwin-Austen, 1882
- Kaliella joubini Dautzenberg & H. Fischer, 1905
- † Kaliella kaliellaeformis (Klebs, 1886)
- Kaliella kezamahensis Godwin-Austen, 1883
- Kaliella khasiaca Godwin-Austen, 1882
- Kaliella kinabaluensis (Tillier & Bouchet, 1989)
- Kaliella kjellerupi Mörch, 1872
- Kaliella lailangkotensis Godwin-Austen, 1883
- Kaliella lamprocystis Möllendorff, 1899
- Kaliella leithiana Godwin-Austen, 1883
- Kaliella leucotropis Quadras & Möllendorff, 1896
- Kaliella lhotaensis Godwin-Austen, 1882
- Kaliella micracyna Saurin, 1953
- Kaliella microconus (Mousson, 1865)
- Kaliella micropetasus Möllendorff, 1893
- Kaliella microsoma Vermeulen, Liew & Schilthuizen, 2015
- Kaliella microtholus Möllendorff, 1895
- Kaliella miliacea (Martens, 1867)
- Kaliella minutissima Godwin-Austen, 1914
- Kaliella monticola Möllendorff, 1884
- Kaliella munipurensis Godwin-Austen, 1882
- Kaliella muongomensis Saurin, 1953
- Kaliella nagaensis Godwin-Austen, 1882
- Kaliella nana (T. Hutton, 1850)
- Kaliella nematorhaphe Möllendorff, 1898
- Kaliella nephelophila (Tillier & Bouchet, 1989)
- Kaliella nongsteinensis Godwin-Austen, 1883
- Kaliella novopommerana I. Rensch, 1932
- Kaliella opaca Quadras & Möllendorff, 1896
- Kaliella ordinaria Ancey, 1904
- Kaliella oxyconus (Möllendorff, 1894)
- Kaliella paucistriata Godwin-Austen, 1907
- Kaliella peliosanthi (Mörch, 1872)
- Kaliella phacomorpha Vermeulen, Liew & Schilthuizen, 2015
- Kaliella polygyra Möllendorff, 1884
- Kaliella pseudositala Möllendorff, 1888
- Kaliella punctata Vermeulen, Liew & Schilthuizen, 2015
- Kaliella pusilla Möllendorff, 1888
- Kaliella pyramidata Yen, 1939
- Kaliella radicita Godwin-Austen, 1914
- Kaliella regularis Möllendorff, 1901
- Kaliella resinula Godwin-Austen, 1882
- Kaliella richilaensis Godwin-Austen, 1907
- Kaliella rissomensis Godwin-Austen, 1907
- Kaliella ruga Godwin-Austen, 1883
- Kaliella rupicola Möllendorff, 1883
- Kaliella salicensis Godwin-Austen, 1897
- Kaliella seckingeriana (Heude, 1882)
- Kaliella shillongensis Godwin-Austen, 1907
- Kaliella sikkimensis Godwin-Austen, 1888
- Kaliella soulaiana Fischer-Piette, 1973
- Kaliella spelaea (Heude, 1882)
- Kaliella stenopleuris Möllendorff, 1887
- Kaliella striolata (Möllendorff, 1901)
- Kaliella stylodonta Quadras & Möllendorff, 1895
- Kaliella subelongata Bavay & Dautzenberg, 1912
- Kaliella sublaxa Vermeulen, Liew & Schilthuizen, 2015
- Kaliella subnodosa Möllendorff, 1898
- Kaliella subsculpta Möllendorff, 1894
- Kaliella tenellula (Mabille, 1887)
- Kaliella teriaensis Godwin-Austen, 1882
- Kaliella tholus Godwin-Austen, 1914
- Kaliella timorensis B. Rensch, 1935
- Kaliella tirutana Godwin-Austen, 1888
- Kaliella tongkingensis Möllendorff, 1901
- Kaliella tonglonensis Möllendorff, 1898
- Kaliella transitans Möllendorff, 1893
- Kaliella vagata (E. A. Smith, 1902)
- Kaliella victoriae Preston, 1912
- Kaliella vulcani Godwin-Austen, 1882
