= Allopeas brevispira =

Scientific classification
- Kingdom: Animalia
- Phylum: Mollusca
- Class: Gastropoda
- Order: Stylommatophora
- Family: Achatinidae
- Genus: Allopeas
- Species: A. brevispira

Binomial name
- Allopeas brevispira (Pilsbry & Y. Hirase, 1904)
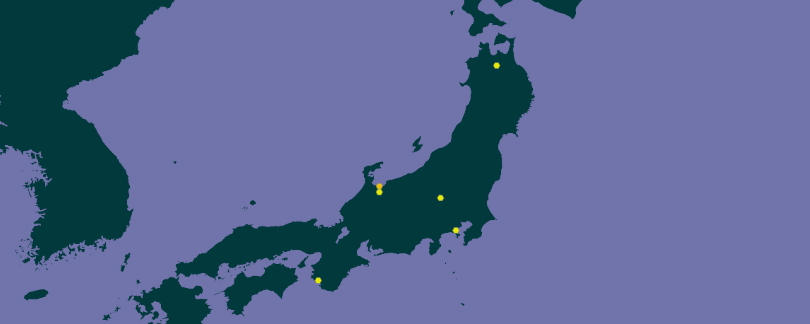

Synonyms
- Opeas brevispira Pilsbry & Y. Hirase, 1904 (original combination)

Species of gastropod

Allopeas brevispira is a species of small, tropical, air-breathing land snail, a terrestrial pulmonate gastropod mollusk in the family Achatinidae.

== Description ==
The length of the shell attains 6 mm, its diameter 3 mm.

(Original description) The shell is openly perforate and oblong, notably short for the genus. It has a corneous, translucent, and glossy surface, finely striated with wrinkles. The spire is short and tapers smoothly to a blunt apex. It has 5½ moderately convex whorls. The aperture is elongated and rhombic-convex, with the outer lip arched forward in the middle. The columellar lip is reflexed, only adhering at the point of insertion, while the columella remains straight.

== Distribution ==
This species occurs in Japan.
