= Allopeas myrmekophilos =

Scientific classification
- Kingdom: Animalia
- Phylum: Mollusca
- Class: Gastropoda
- Order: Stylommatophora
- Family: Achatinidae
- Genus: Allopeas
- Species: A. myrmekophilos

Binomial name
- Allopeas myrmekophilos R. Janssen, 2002

Species of gastropod

Allopeas myrmekophilos is a species of small, tropical, air-breathing land snail, a terrestrial pulmonate gastropod mollusk in the family Achatinidae.

== Distribution ==
Allopeas myrmekophilos lives in Malaysia.

== Ecology ==
A. myrmkophilos produces a foam that is highly attractive to Leptogenys distinguenda host ants, which then transport the snail to their nest site.
