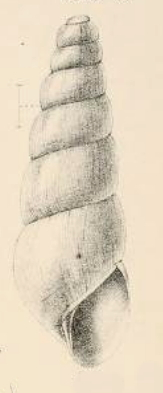
- Shell of Allopeas heudei (holotype)

Scientific classification
- Kingdom: Animalia
- Phylum: Mollusca
- Class: Gastropoda
- Order: Stylommatophora
- Family: Achatinidae
- Genus: Allopeas
- Species: A. heudei

Binomial name
- Allopeas heudei (Pilsbry, 1906)

Synonyms
- Opeas heudei Pilsbry, 1906

= Allopeas heudei =

Species of gastropod

Allopeas heudei is a species of small, tropical, air-breathing land snail, a terrestrial pulmonate gastropod mollusk in the family Achatinidae.

== Description ==
The length of the shell attains 8.5 mm, its diameter 2.7 mm.

(Original description) The rimmed and turrited shell tapers uniformly with straight sides. It is thin, faintly yellowish-corneous, and glossy, with delicate wrinkle-like striations. The shell consists of 7½ moderately convex whorls, separated by a deeply impressed suture. The ovate aperture is about 3.5 times shorter than the total shell length. The columella is slightly concave and broadly reflexed near the top.

== Distribution ==
This species occurs in China, Japan and Korea.
