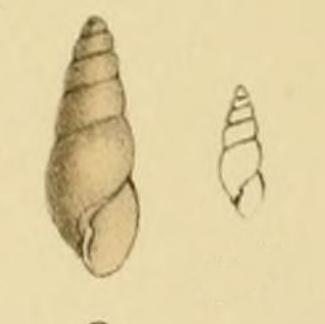
- Shell of Allopeas recisa (holotype)

Scientific classification
- Kingdom: Animalia
- Phylum: Mollusca
- Class: Gastropoda
- Order: Stylommatophora
- Superfamily: Achatinoidea
- Family: Achatinidae
- Genus: Allopeas
- Species: A. recisa

Binomial name
- Allopeas recisa (Morelet, 1885)

Synonyms
- Stenogyra recisa Morelet, 1885 (original combination)

= Allopeas recisa =

Species of gastropod

Allopeas recisa is a species of small, tropical, air-breathing land snail, a terrestrial pulmonate gastropod mollusk in the family Achatinidae.

== Description ==
The length of the shell attains 6 millimetres (0.24 in), its diameter 2.25 millimetres (0.089 in).

T. imperforata, breviter turrita, tenuis, arcuatim inciso-striata, hyalina, cornea, nitidissima, pallide fulva. Spira conoidea, apice obtusiuscula. Anfr. 6 plano-convexi, ultimo ampliato, longitudinis 1/3 superante. Apert. semiovalis, marginibus simplicibus, columellari sinuoso. breviter superne revoluto. — Longit. 6; diam. 2 1/4 mill.
The shell is imperforate and short-turreted. It is characterized by its thin, translucent structure adorned with arched, incised striations. It has a hyaline, horny texture, displaying a very glossy, pale yellowish hue. The spire is conical with a somewhat blunt apex, consisting of 6 flatly convex whorls. The body whorl is notably enlarged, occupying more than one-third of the shell's total length. The aperture is semi-oval with simple margins, and the columella is sinuous, briefly revolute at the upper end.

—Morelet, Arthur (1885). "Coquilles terrestres et fluviatiles de l'Afrique équinoxiale". Journal de Conchyliologie

== Distribution ==
The distribution of Allopeas recisa includes:

- Gabon.
