= Allopeas hedeius =

Scientific classification
- Kingdom: Animalia
- Phylum: Mollusca
- Class: Gastropoda
- Order: Stylommatophora
- Family: Achatinidae
- Genus: Allopeas
- Species: A. hedeius

Binomial name
- Allopeas hedeius (Mabille, 1887)

Synonyms
- Opeas hedeius Mabille, 1887 (original combination)

Species of gastropod

Allopeas hedeius is a species of small, tropical, air-breathing land snail, a terrestrial pulmonate gastropod mollusk in the family Achatinidae.

== Description ==
The length of the shell attains 15 mm, its diameter 3 mm.

(Original description in French) The small shell is perforate and has an elongate-turriculate shape. The shell is fragile and corneous, with a subtle glossy sheen. It is adorned with fine, closely spaced, arched striations. The slender spire tapers to a small, shiny, and slightly pointed apex. The shell comprises nine whorls that exhibit steady, slightly rapid growth, with a gentle convexity. These whorls are separated by a distinct, slightly margined suture, delicately embellished with granules. The body whorl is subcylindrical and slightly swollen, accounting for a third of the shell's total height, and it gently descends towards the end. The aperture is vertical, rounded, and arched at the base. The columella is slightly arched, thickened, and calloused, extending down to the base of the aperture. The outer lip is nearly straight, while the columellar margin is dilated, partially concealing the perforation.

== Distribution ==
This species occurs in Kenya. The holotype was found in "Tonkin" (the northern region of Vietnam).
