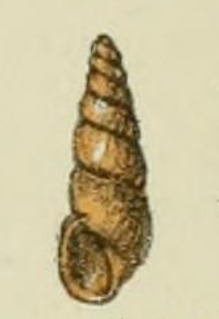
- Shell of Allopeas pusillum (holotype)

Scientific classification
- Kingdom: Animalia
- Phylum: Mollusca
- Class: Gastropoda
- Order: Stylommatophora
- Family: Achatinidae
- Genus: Allopeas
- Species: A. pusillum

Binomial name
- Allopeas pusillum (H. Adams, 1867)

Synonyms
- Bulimulus (Ena) pusillus H. Adams, 1867 superseded combination

= Allopeas pusillum =

Species of gastropod

Allopeas pusillum is a species of small, tropical, air-breathing land snail, a terrestrial pulmonate gastropod mollusk in the family Achatinidae.

== Description ==
The length of the shell attains 5 mm, its diameter 2 mm.

(Original description in Latin) This is a sinistral shell with a narrow perforation and a cylindrical, turreted shape. The shell is thin, evenly striated, and has a subtle gloss, with an olive-brown coloration. The spire is elongated, gradually tapering towards a somewhat blunt apex, and is marked by a distinct suture. It features 7 slightly convex whorls, with the body whorl making up barely one-third of the total shell length, ending in a rounded base. The aperture is vertical and semi-oval in shape. The peristome is straight, with the columellar margin nearly vertical, slightly expanded at the top, and open.

== Distribution ==
The distribution of Allopeas pusillum includes:

- Sri Lanka.
