= Kaliella hongkongensis =

Conservation status
- Vulnerable (IUCN 2.3)

Scientific classification
- Kingdom: Animalia
- Phylum: Mollusca
- Class: Gastropoda
- Order: Stylommatophora
- Family: Chronidae
- Genus: Kaliella
- Species: K. hongkongensis

Binomial name
- Kaliella hongkongensis Möllendorff, 1883

Species of gastropod

Kaliella hongkongensis is a species of air-breathing land snails or semi-slugs, terrestrial pulmonate gastropod mollusks in the family Chronidae.

This species is endemic to Hong Kong.
