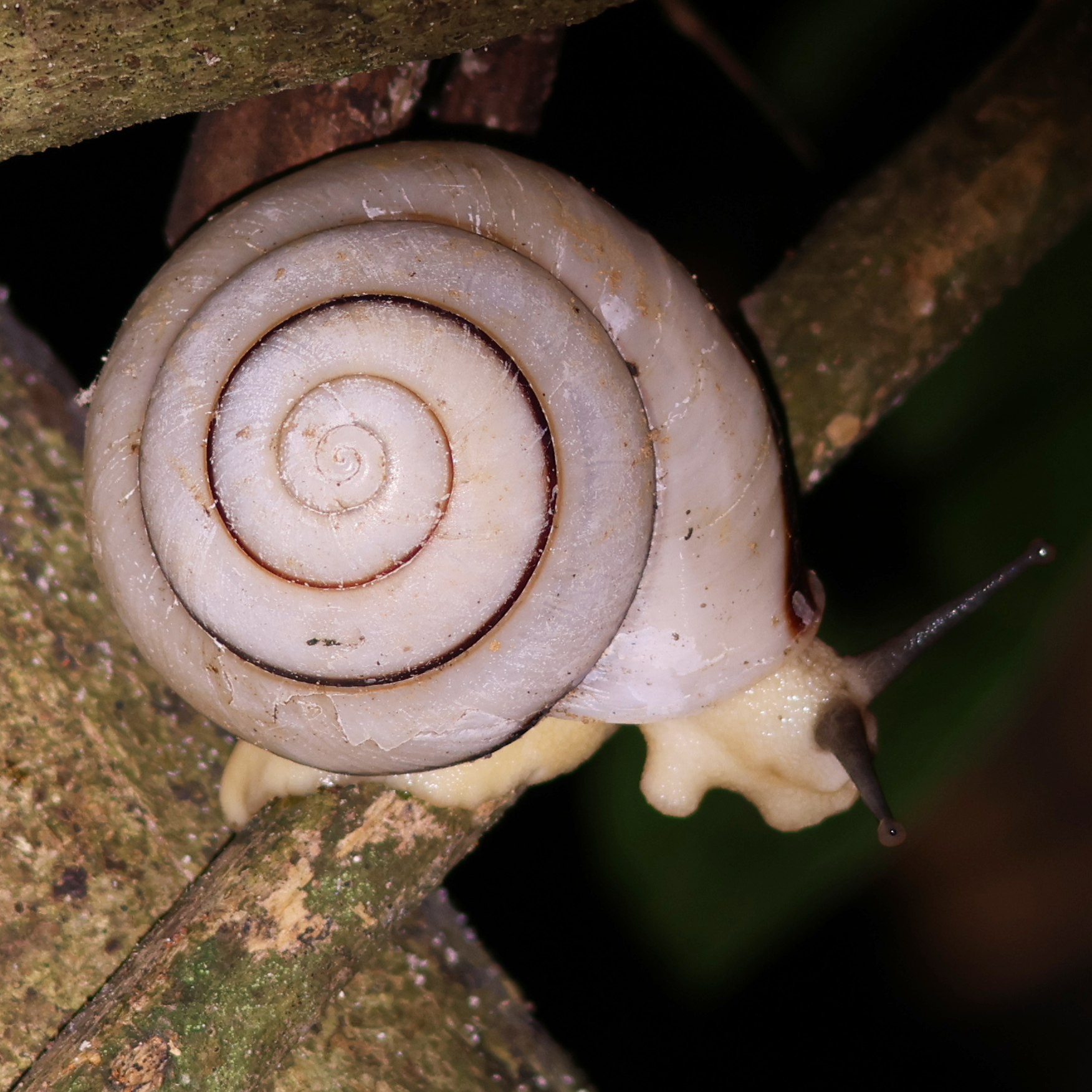

Scientific classification
- Kingdom: Animalia
- Phylum: Mollusca
- Class: Gastropoda
- Order: Stylommatophora
- Family: Camaenidae
- Genus: Camaena
- Species: C. chuongi

Binomial name
- Camaena chuongi Thach, 2016

= Camaena chuongi =

Species of snail

Camaena chuongi is a species of air-breathing snail in the family Camaenidae. It was first discovered in February 2016 in Tân Lạc, Hòa Bình, Vietnam.
