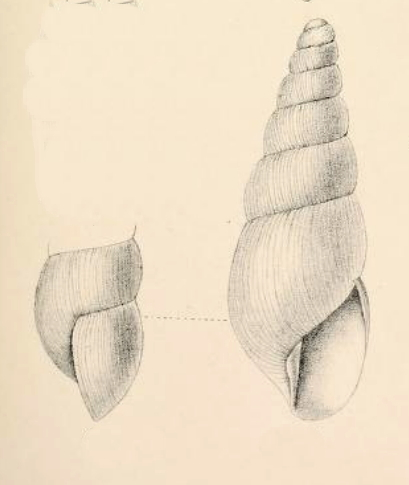
- Shell of Allopeas satsumense (holotype)

Scientific classification
- Kingdom: Animalia
- Phylum: Mollusca
- Class: Gastropoda
- Order: Stylommatophora
- Family: Achatinidae
- Genus: Allopeas
- Species: A. satsumense

Binomial name
- Allopeas satsumense (Pilsbry, 1906)

Synonyms
- Opeas satsumense Pilsbry, 1906

= Allopeas satsumense =

Species of gastropod

Allopeas satsumense is a species of small, tropical, air-breathing land snail, a terrestrial pulmonate gastropod mollusk in the family Achatinidae.

== Description ==
The length of the shell attains 9.8 mm, its diameter 3.3 mm.

(Original description) The shell is either imperforate (lacking the normal opening) or nearly so, with a turrite-conic shape and straight lateral outlines. It is thin, greenish-corneous, and slightly translucent. The surface has a moderate gloss, with weak and irregular striations. These consist of coarse, low, wave-like wrinkles interspersed with narrower ripples, all of which are strongly arcuate (curved). The base is considerably smoother.

The shell comprises 7 1/2 whorls, which are notably flattened, especially in the later stages. The suture is narrow but well-defined. The aperture is narrow and pear-shaped (piriform), with a thin outer lip that arches forward at the top, while the basal margin is retracted. The columella is straight and vertical, not extending to the base. Below it, the margin bends to the left and is retracted. In adults, the columellar margin is reflexed and closely adhered to the shell, with a very narrow perforation present in younger specimens.

== Distribution ==
This species occurs in Japan.
