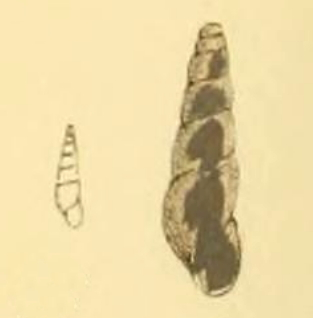
- Drawing of a shell of Allopeas acmella (holotype)

Scientific classification
- Domain: Eukaryota
- Kingdom: Animalia
- Phylum: Mollusca
- Class: Gastropoda
- Order: Stylommatophora
- Suborder: Achatinina
- Superfamily: Achatinoidea
- Family: Achatinidae
- Genus: Allopeas
- Species: A. acmella

Binomial name
- Allopeas acmella (Morelet, 1885)

Synonyms
- Stenogyra acmella Morelet, 1885 (original combination)

= Allopeas acmella =

Species of gastropod

Allopeas acmella is a species of small, tropical, air-breathing land snail, a terrestrial pulmonate gastropod mollusk in the family Achatinidae.

== Description ==
The length of the shell attains 4.5 mm, its diameter 4 ¼ mm.

(Original description in Latin) The crystalline and smooth shell is small, turreted and needle-shaped, with a slightly blunt apex. It has 7 barely convex whorls, bordered by a finely toothed suture, with the body whorl making up about one-fourth of the shell's length. The aperture is ovate-lunate, with simple, curved margins, and the columellar margin slightly expanded and reflected at the top.

== Distribution ==
This species was found in the Mayumba National Park, Gabon.
