= Sitala mazumbaiensis =

Conservation status
- Data Deficient (IUCN 2.3)

Scientific classification
- Kingdom: Animalia
- Phylum: Mollusca
- Class: Gastropoda
- Order: Stylommatophora
- Family: Helicarionidae
- Genus: Sitala
- Species: S. mazumbaiensis

Binomial name
- Sitala mazumbaiensis Verdcourt

Species of mollusc

Sitala mazumbaiensis is a species of air-breathing land snail, a terrestrial pulmonate gastropod mollusk in the family Helicarionidae. This species is endemic to Tanzania.
