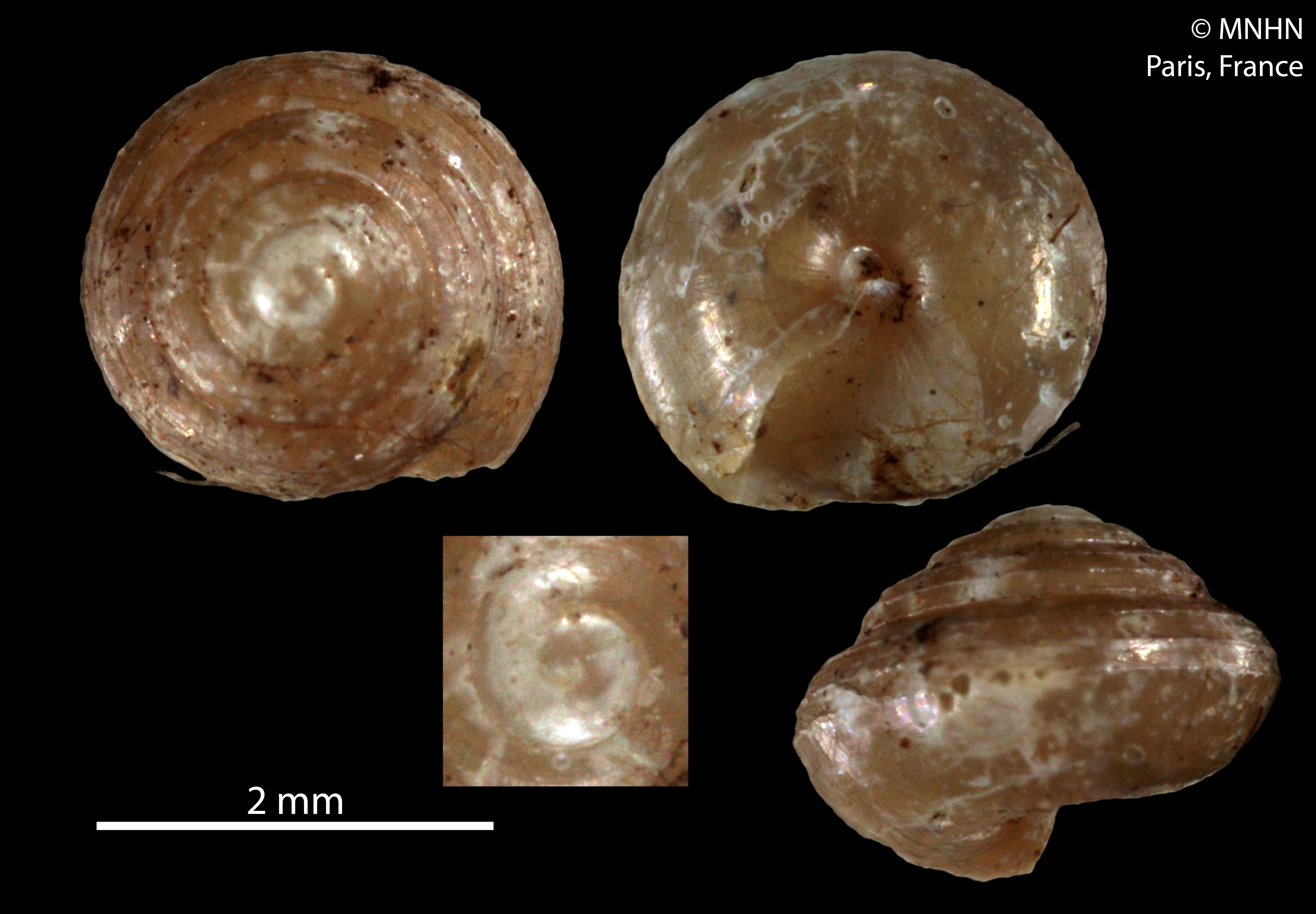
- Shell of Sitala aliceae (paratype at MNHN, Paris)

Scientific classification
- Domain: Eukaryota
- Kingdom: Animalia
- Phylum: Mollusca
- Class: Gastropoda
- Order: Stylommatophora
- Family: Helicarionidae
- Subfamily: Durgellinae
- Tribe: Durgellini
- Genus: Sitala; Adams, 1865

Synonyms
- Conulema Stoliczka, 1871; Nanina (Liocystis) Mörch, 1872; Nanina (Sitala) H. Adams, 1865; Turrisitala Iredale, 1933

= Sitala =

Genus of gastropods

Sitala is a genus of air-breathing land snails, terrestrial pulmonate gastropod mollusks in the subfamily Durgellinae of the family Helicarionidae.

Sitala is the type genus of the subfamily Sitalinae (which is a synonym of Durgellini.)

== Species ==
Species within the genus Sitala include:

- Sitala acuta (Fischer-Piette & Salvat, 1966)
- Sitala acutecarinata Bavay & Dautzenberg, 1904
- Sitala ahitsitondronae Salvat, 1966
- Sitala aliceae Emberton & Pearce, 2000
- Sitala amabilis Fischer-Piette & Salvat, 1966
- Sitala ambovombeensis Fischer-Piette, Blanc, F. & Vukadinovic, 1974
- Sitala ampanasanensis Fischer-Piette, C. P. Blanc, F. Blanc & F. Salvat, 1994
- Sitala anakasakasensis Fischer-Piette, Blanc, F. & Vukadinovic, 1974
- Sitala ankazobei Fischer-Piette, C. P. Blanc, F. Blanc & F. Salvat, 1994
- Sitala antsingiana Fischer-Piette, Blanc, F. & Salvat, 1975
- Sitala arx (Benson, 1859)
- Sitala attegia (Benson, 1859)
- Sitala balliana Godwin-Austen, 1883
- Sitala bathiei (Fischer-Piette, Blanc, F. & Salvat, 1975)
- Sitala billeheusti (Crosse & P. Fischer, 1864)
- Sitala brancsiki O. Boettger, 1892
- Sitala burchi K. C. Emberton, Slapcinsky, C. A. Campbell, Rakotondrazafy, Andriamiarison & J. D. Emberton, 2010
- Sitala celebica P. Sarasin & F. Sarasin, 1899
- Sitala celestinae Emberton & Griffiths, 2009
- Sitala champfauri Fischer-Piette, C. P. Blanc, F. Blanc & F. Salvat, 1994
- Sitala circumfiliaris (Morelet, 1879)
- Sitala confinis (Möllendorff, 1901) (nomenclature: Sitala confinis (Blanford, 1865) and Sitala confinis (Möllendorff, 1901) are currently secondary homonyms but may end up in different genera and a replacement name may not be necessary)
- Sitala confinis (W. T. Blanford, 1865)
- Sitala conradti Thiele, 1933
- Sitala crenicincta Godwin-Austen, 1883
- Sitala culmen (W. T. Blanford, 1865)
- Sitala culminis (Fischer-Piette & Salvat, 1966)
- Sitala decaryi Fischer-Piette, C. P. Blanc, F. Blanc & F. Salvat, 1994
- Sitala delaportei Fischer-Piette, Blanc, F. & Salvat, 1975
- Sitala delphini (Fischer-Piette, Blanc, F. & Vukadinovic, 1974)
- Sitala denselirata (Preston, 1908)
- Sitala elegans Emberton & Pearce, 2000
- Sitala elevata (Fischer-Piette & Salvat, 1966)
- Sitala euconuliforma Emberton & Pearce, 2000
- Sitala everetti Godwin-Austen, 1891
- Sitala filomarginata O. Boettger, 1892
- Sitala frenesti Fischer-Piette, C. P. Blanc, F. Blanc & F. Salvat, 1994
- Sitala gaudens Fischer-Piette & Salvat, 1966
- Sitala gaudialis Fischer-Piette, C. P. Blanc, F. Blanc & F. Salvat, 1994
- Sitala globulosa (Möllendorff, 1900)
- Sitala gratulator (W. T. Blanford, 1865)
- Sitala gromatica Godwin-Austen, 1882
- Sitala grommatica Godwin-Austen, 1882
- Sitala haroldi Godwin-Austen, 1882
- Sitala hestia (Dohrn, 1882)
- Sitala hirsuta Emberton & Griffiths, 2009
- Sitala ilapiryae Emberton & Pearce, 2000
- Sitala infula (Benson, 1848)
- Sitala injussa (W. T. Blanford & H. F. Blanford, 1861)
- Sitala insularis Möllendorff, 1894
- Sitala intonsa Godwin-Austen, 1883
- Sitala jenynsi (L. Pfeiffer, 1845)
- Sitala jeromi Fischer-Piette, C. P. Blanc, F. Blanc & F. Salvat, 1994
- Sitala josephinae Emberton & Pearce, 2000
- Sitala kendrae Emberton & Griffiths, 2009
- Sitala kuiperi Fischer-Piette, C. P. Blanc, F. Blanc & F. Salvat, 1994
- Sitala leroyi (Bourguignat, 1890)
- Sitala limata Godwin-Austen, 1882
- Sitala lincolni Emberton & Griffiths, 2009
- Sitala liricincta (Stolickzka, 1871)
- Sitala madecassina (Fischer-Piette & Salvat, 1966)
- Sitala mavo K. C. Emberton, Slapcinsky, C. A. Campbell, Rakotondrazafy, Andriamiarison & J. D. Emberton, 2010
- Sitala mazumbaiensis Verdcourt, 1977
- Sitala michellae Emberton & Griffiths, 2009
- Sitala minuta Emberton & Griffiths, 2009
- Sitala multivolvis Bavay & Dautzenberg, 1912
- Sitala nicklesi Fischer-Piette, C. P. Blanc, F. Blanc & F. Salvat, 1994
- Sitala normalis (Iredale, 1933)
- Sitala ochthogyra (Möllendorff, 1901)
- Sitala operiens Sykes, 1898
- Sitala palmaria (Benson, 1864)
- Sitala patwrightae Emberton, 1994
- Sitala pealii Godwin-Austen, 1914
- Sitala phulongensis Godwin-Austen, 1882
- Sitala phyllophila (Benson, 1863)
- Sitala placita Godwin-Austen, 1883
- Sitala pyramidalis Sykes, 1898
- Sitala recondita Godwin-Austen, 1883
- Sitala rimicola (Benson, 1859)
- Sitala roedereri Fischer-Piette, Blanc, F. & Salvat, 1975
- Sitala sculptilis (Möllendorff, 1901)
- Sitala soa Emberton & Pearce, 2000
- Sitala soulaiana Fischer-Piette, Cauquoin & Testud, 1973
- Sitala srimani Godwin-Austen, 1882
- Sitala stanisici K. C. Emberton, Slapcinsky, C. A. Campbell, Rakotondrazafy, Andriamiarison & J. D. Emberton, 2010
- Sitala steudneri (Jickeli, 1874)
- Sitala subangulata (Möllendorff, 1901)
- Sitala subinjussa Godwin-Austen, 1914
- Sitala sublirata Godwin-Austen, 1882
- Sitala subnana Godwin-Austen, 1883
- Sitala tredi Fischer-Piette, C. P. Blanc, F. Blanc & F. Salvat, 1994
- Sitala tricincta Saurin, 1953
- Sitala trochulus (Möllendorff, 1883)
- Sitala trosti Fischer-Piette, C. P. Blanc, F. Blanc & F. Salvat, 1994
- Sitala turrita Möllendorff, 1883
- Sitala uvida Godwin-Austen, 1883
- Sitala vaga Godwin-Austen, 1914
- Sitala vasihae Emberton & Pearce, 2000
- Sitala vulcania Blanford & Godwin-Austen, 1908
- Sitala zenkeri Thiele, 1931

== Species brought into synonymy ==
- Sitala accepta E. A. Smith, 1895: synonym of Kaliella accepta (E. A. Smith, 1895)
- Sitala angulifera Pilsbry & Hirase, 1905: synonym of Sitalina angulifera (Pilsbry & Hirase, 1905) (original combination)
- Sitala anthropophagorum Hedley, 1894: synonym of Durgellina anthropophagorum (Hedley, 1894) (original combination)
- Sitala apicata (W. T. Blanford, 1870): synonym of Euplecta apicata (W. T. Blanford, 1870) (unaccepted combination)
- Sitala bandongensis O. Boettger, 1890: synonym of Kaliella microconus (Mousson, 1865)
- Sitala baritensis E. A. Smith, 1893: synonym of Kaliella microconus (Mousson, 1865)
- Sitala bicarinata van Benthem Jutting, 1929: synonym of Philalanka tjibodasensis (Leschke, 1914) (junior synonym)
- Sitala bicincta Bavay & Dautzenberg, 1912: synonym of Ruthvenia bicincta (Bavay & Dautzenberg, 1912) (original combination)
- Sitala bilirata (W. T. Blanford & H. F. Blanford, 1861): synonym of Philalanka bilirata (W. T. Blanford & H. F. Blanford, 1861) (unaccepted combination)
- Sitala busauensis E. A. Smith, 1895: synonym of Kaliella busauensis (E. A. Smith, 1895) (original combination)
- Sitala capillacea Soós, 1911: synonym of Durgellina capillacea (Soós, 1911) (original combination)
- Sitala cara E. A. Smith, 1895: synonym of Kaliella barrakporensis (L. Pfeiffer, 1852)
- Sitala carinifera Stoliczka, 1873: synonym of Philalanka carinifera (Stoliczka, 1873) (original combination)
- Sitala carinigera Tapparone Canefri, 1886: synonym of Philalanka carinigera (Tapparone Canefri, 1886) (original combination)
- Sitala circumcincta (Reinhardt, 1883): synonym of Sitalina circumcincta (Reinhardt, 1883) (unaccepted combination)
- Sitala collinae E. A. Smith, 1898: synonym of Durgellina collinae (E. A. Smith, 1898)
- Sitala concavispira F. Haas, 1936: synonym of Afroconulus concavispira (F. Haas, 1936) (original combination)
- Sitala crenocarinata Schepman, 1918: synonym of Durgellina crenocarinata (Schepman, 1918) (original combination)
- Sitala demissa E. A. Smith 1895: synonym of Kaliella calculosa (Gould, 1852)
- Sitala diaphana Connolly, 1922: synonym of Afroconulus diaphanus (Connolly, 1922) (original combination)
- Sitala ditropis Quadras & Möllendorff, 1894: synonym of Kaliella ditropis (Quadras & Möllendorff, 1894) (superseded combination)
- Sitala dulcis E. A. Smith, 1895: synonym of Kaliella scandens (Cox, 1871)
- Sitala elatior Bavay & Dautzenberg, 1908: synonym of Thysanota conula (Blanford, 1865)
- Sitala febrilis (W. T. Blanford & H. F. Blanford, 1861): synonym of Philalanka febrilis (W. T. Blanford & H. F. Blanford, 1861) (unaccepted combination)
- Sitala fimbriosa Quadras & Möllendorff, 1894: synonym of Thysanota conula (Blanford, 1865)
- Sitala fragilis Schepman, 1919: synonym of Durgellina fragilis (Schepman, 1919) (original combination)
- Sitala gradata Schepman, 1919: synonym of Durgellina gradata (Schepman, 1919) (original combination)
- Sitala gunongensis Godwin-Austen, 1909: synonym of Helicarion gunongensis (Godwin-Austen, 1909) (original combination)
- Sitala hainanensis Möllendorff, 1887: synonym of Sitalina hainanensis (Möllendorff, 1887) (original combination)
- Sitala hirasei Pilsbry, 1905: synonym of Sitalina hirasei (Pilsbry, 1905) (original combination)
- Sitala homfrayi Godwin-Austen, 1895: synonym of Philalanka homfrayi (Godwin-Austen, 1895) (original combination)
- Sitala inaequisculpta E. A. Smith, 1895: synonym of Philalanka moluensis (E. A. Smith, 1893)
- Sitala infantilis E. A. Smith, 1895: synonym of Kaliella infantilis (E. A. Smith, 1895) (original combination)
- Sitala insignis Pilsbry & Hirase, 1904: synonym of Sitalina insignis (Pilsbry & Hirase, 1904) (original combination)
- Sitala iredalei Preston, 1912: synonym of Afroconulus iredalei (Preston, 1912) (original combination)
- Sitala javana Möllendorff, 1897: synonym of Kaliella microconus (Mousson, 1865)
- Sitala latissima Pilsbry, 1902: synonym of Sitalina latissima (Pilsbry, 1902) (original combination)
- Sitala lineolata Möllendorff, 1891: synonym of Liardetia lineolata (Möllendorff, 1891) (superseded combination)
- Sitala lorentzi Schepman, 1919: synonym of Durgellina lorentzi (Schepman, 1919) (original combination)
- Sitala moluensis E. A. Smith, 1893: synonym of Philalanka moluensis (E. A. Smith, 1893)
- Sitala mononema (Benson, 1853): synonym of Philalanka mononema (Benson, 1853) (unaccepted combination)
- Sitala niijimana Pilsbry & Y. Hirase, 1903: synonym of Parasitala niijimana (Pilsbry & Y. Hirase, 1903) (original combination)
- Sitala normani (E. A. Smith, 1889): synonym of Lamprocystis normani (E. A. Smith, 1889) (superseded combination)
- Sitala orchis Godwin-Austen, 1891: synonym of Kaliella doliolum (L. Pfeiffer, 1846)
- Sitala oxyconus Möllendorff, 1894: synonym of Kaliella oxyconus (Möllendorff, 1894) (superseded combination)
- Sitala philippinarum Möllendorff, 1887: synonym of Liardetia philippinarum (Möllendorff, 1887) (original combination)
- Sitala propinqua Tapparone Canefri, 1886: synonym of Liardetia proqinqua (Tapparone Canefri, 1886) (original combination)
- Sitala pudica Gude, 1905: synonym of Liardetia scandens (Cox, 1872): synonym of Kaliella scandens (Cox, 1872) (junior synonym)
- Sitala quadricarinata Gude, 1917: synonym of Philalanka kusana (Aldrich, 1889)
- Sitala raricostulata E. A. Smith, 1893: synonym of Rahula raricostulata (E. A. Smith, 1893)
- Sitala rumbangensis E. A. Smith, 1895: synonym of Kaliella barrakporensis (L. Pfeiffer, 1852)
- Sitala singularis Godwin-Austen, 1891: synonym of Kaliella microconus (Mousson, 1865)
- Sitala striolata Möllendorff, 1901: synonym of Kaliella striolata (Möllendorff, 1901) (original combination)
- Sitala subbilirata Godwin-Austen, 1882: synonym of Philalanka subbilirata (Godwin-Austen, 1882) (original combination)
- Sitala subglobosa Soós, 1911: synonym of Durgellina subglobosa (Soós, 1911) (original combination)
- Sitala sublimis Hedley, 1897: synonym of Microcystina sublimis (Hedley, 1897) (original combination)
- Sitala sublineolata Möllendorff, 1902: synonym of Coneuplecta sublineolata (Möllendorff, 1902) (original combination)
- Sitala subscalaris Möllendorff, 1902: synonym of Queridomus subscalaris (Möllendorff, 1902) (original combination)
- Sitala tertiana (W. T. Blanford & H. F. Blanford, 1861): synonym of Philalanka tertiana (W. T. Blanford & H. F. Blanford, 1861)
- Sitala tjibodasensis Leschke, 1914: synonym of Philalanka tjibodasensis (Leschke, 1914) (original combination)
- Sitala tricarinata (W. T. Blanford & H. F. Blanford, 1861): synonym of Philalanka tricarinata (W. T. Blanford & H. F. Blanford, 1861) (unaccepted combination)
- Sitala tripilaris Gredler, 1890: synonym of Euplecta tripilaris (Gredler, 1890) (original combination)
- Sitala ultima Pilsbry & Hirase, 1909: synonym of Parasitala ultima (Hirase, 1908)
- Sitala urguessensis Connolly, 1925: synonym of Afroconulus urguessensis (Connolly, 1925) (original combination)
- Sitala vagata E. A. Smith, 1903: synonym of Kaliella vagata (E. A. Smith, 1903) (original combination)
- Sitala wilcoxi (Cox, 1865): synonym of Coneuplecta calculosa (A. Gould, 1852) (junior synonym)
