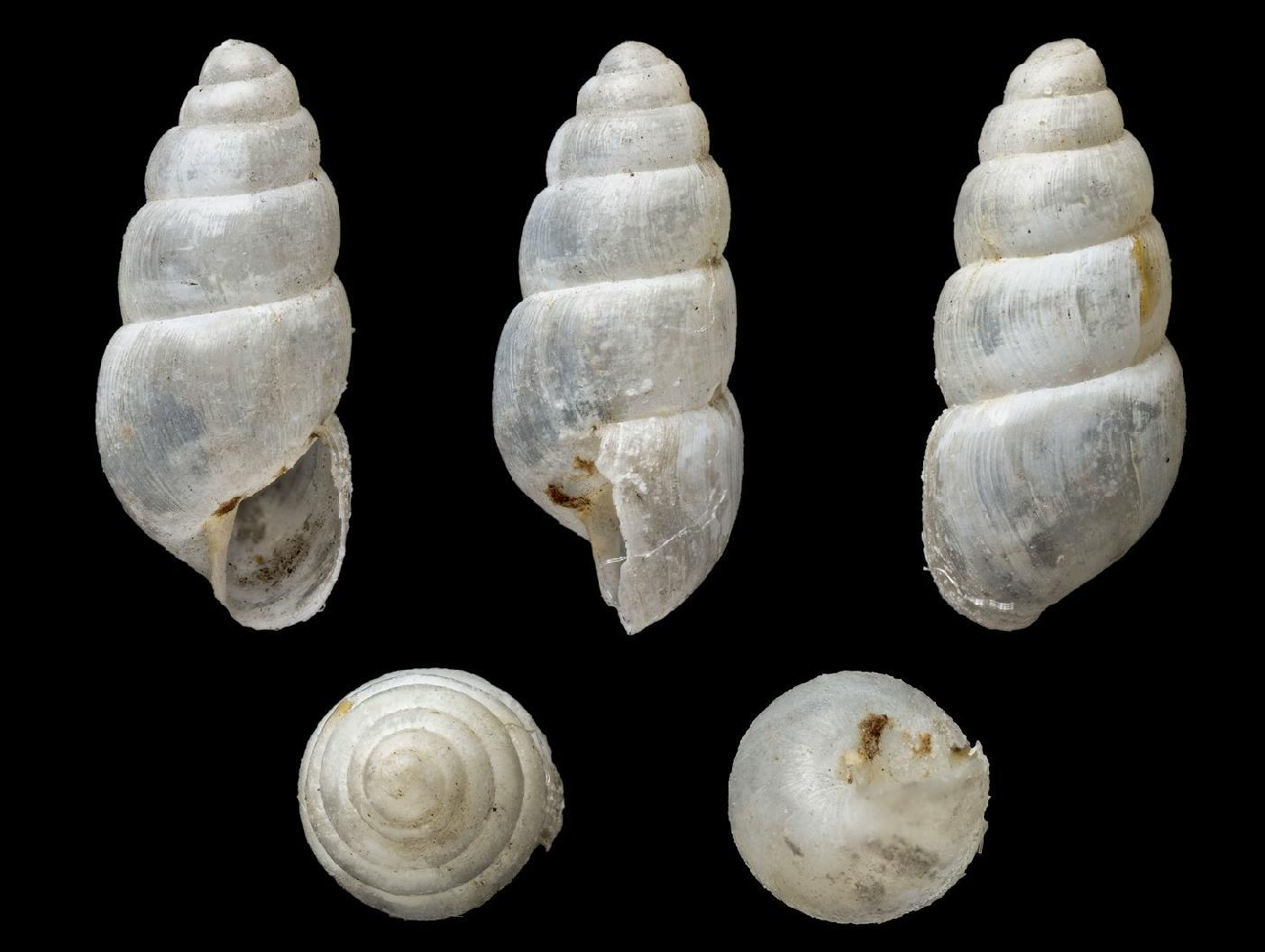
- Shell of Allopeas latebricola (specimen at the Natural History Museum, London)

Scientific classification
- Kingdom: Animalia
- Phylum: Mollusca
- Class: Gastropoda
- Order: Stylommatophora
- Family: Achatinidae
- Genus: Allopeas
- Species: A. latebricola

Binomial name
- Allopeas latebricola (Reeve, 1849)

Synonyms
- Bulimus latebricola Reeve, 1849 (original combination); Lamellaxis (Allopeas) latebricola (Reeve, 1849) (unaccepted combination)

= Allopeas latebricola =

Species of gastropod

Allopeas latebricola is a species of small, tropical, air-breathing land snail, a terrestrial pulmonate gastropod mollusk in the family Achatinidae.

== Description ==
The length of the shell attains 7.33 mm, its diameter 7.3 mm.

The shell is acuminately oblong and slightly umbilicated, with six somewhat rounded whorls that are either smooth or concentrically striated. It has a polished, transparent straw-colored appearance, giving it a delicate and refined look.

The shell is subperforate, turrited-oblong, and relatively thin, with fine striations and a slight sheen. It is diaphanous, with a whitish straw-colored hue. The spire is turrited with a rather obtuse apex. The shell typically has 6 to 6.5 whorls, which are slightly convex. The body whorl accounts for a little more than one-third of the shell's total length and is rounded at the base. The columella is somewhat straight and vertical.

The aperture is vertical and oblong, with a simple, unexpanded peristome. The margins are nearly parallel, with the columellar margin narrowly reflexed.

== Distribution ==
This species occurs in the Western Himalayas in India.
