= Kaliella barrakporensis =

Scientific classification
- Kingdom: Animalia
- Phylum: Mollusca
- Class: Gastropoda
- Order: Stylommatophora
- Family: Chronidae
- Genus: Kaliella
- Species: K. barrakporensis

Binomial name
- Kaliella barrakporensis (Pfeiffer, 1853)

Synonyms
- Helix barrakporensis L.Pfeiffer, 1853; Helix pretoriensis Melvill & Ponsonby, 1890; Kaliella angigyra Möllendorff, 1897; Kaliella angigyra subsp. balica B.Rensch, 1932; Kaliella angigyra subsp. heteromorpha B.Rensch, 1932; Kaliella consobrina Preston, 1912; Kaliella kigeziensis Preston, 1912; Kaliella sigurensis Godwin-Austen, 1882; Liardetia angigyra (Möllendorff, 1897); Nanina barakporensis (G.Nevill, 1877); Nanina basalis Dohrn, 1882; Sitala cara E.A.Smith, 1895

Species of gastropod

Kaliella barrakporensis is a species of gastropods belonging to the family Chronidae.

The species is found in Africa and Southern Asia.
