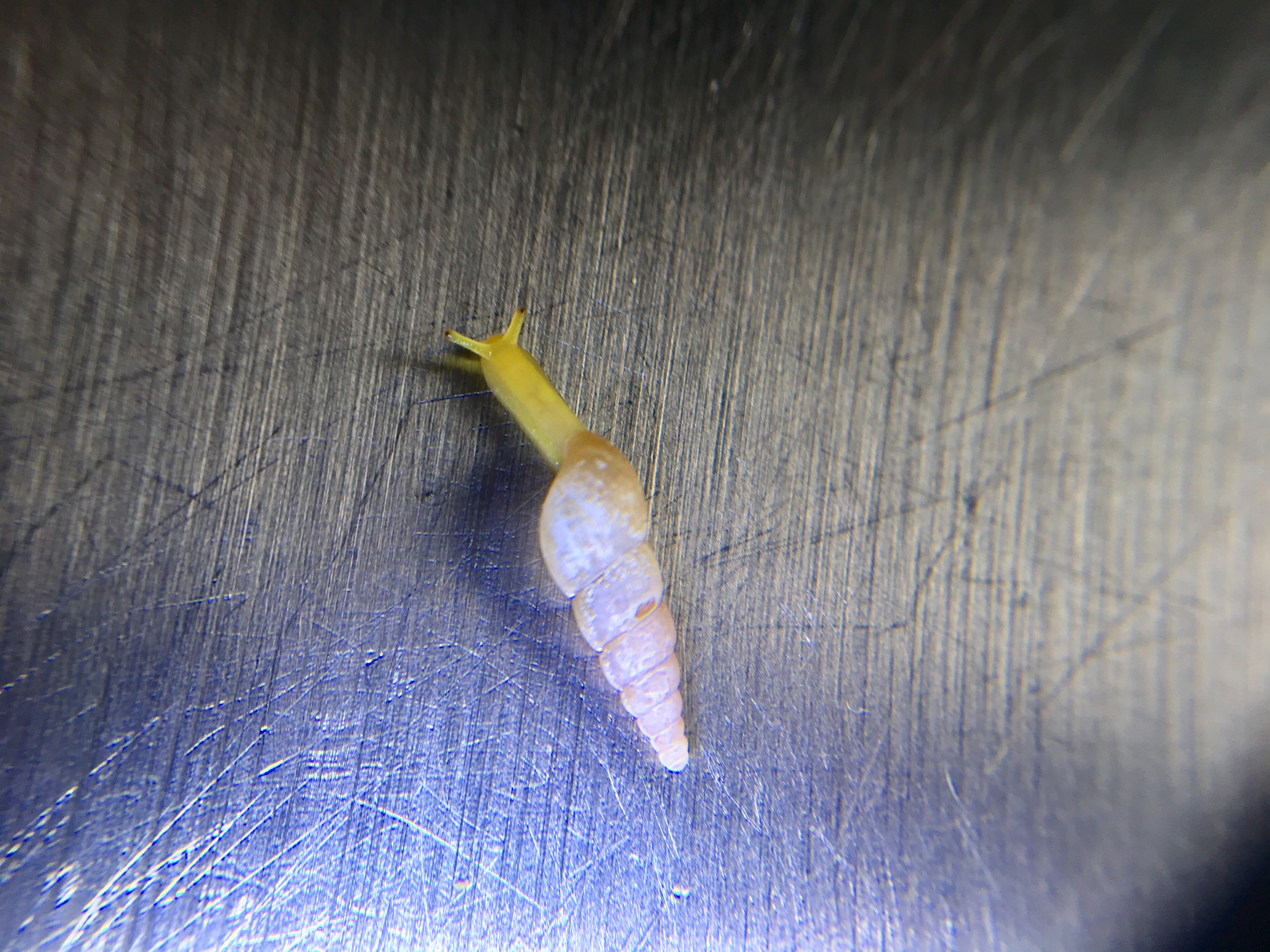
- Allopeas gracile

Scientific classification
- Kingdom: Animalia
- Phylum: Mollusca
- Class: Gastropoda
- Order: Stylommatophora
- Family: Achatinidae
- Subfamily: Subulininae
- Genus: Allopeas; H. B. Baker, 1935

Type species
- Bulimus gracilis T. Hutton, 1834

Synonyms
- Lamellaxis Strebel & Pfeffer, 1882; Lamellaxis (Allopeas) H. B. Baker, 1935(original combination)

= Allopeas =

Genus of gastropods

Allopeas, common name the "awl snails", is a genus of small, tropical, air-breathing land snails, terrestrial pulmonate gastropod mollusks in the family Achatinidae.

== Species ==
The genus Allopeas includes the following species:

- Allopeas acmella (Morelet, 1885)
- † Allopeas agnolini Miquel, 2024
- Allopeas brevispira (Pilsbry & Y. Hirase, 1904)
- Allopeas cavernicola (Annandale & Chopra, 1924)
- Allopeas clavulinum (Potiez & Michaud, 1838) - spike awlsnail
- Allopeas franzhuberi Thach, 2021
- Allopeas gracile (Hutton, 1834) - graceful awlsnail - type species
- Allopeas hedeius (Mabille, 1887)
- Allopeas heudei (Pilsbry, 1906)
- Allopeas latebricola (Reeve, 1849)
- Allopeas mariae (Jousseaume, 1894)
- Allopeas micra (d'Orbigny, 1835)
- Allopeas myrmekophilos R. Janssen, 2002
- Allopeas prestoni (Sykes, 1898)
- Allopeas pusillum (H. Adams, 1867)
- Allopeas recisa (Morelet, 1885)
- Allopeas satsumense (Pilsbry, 1906)
- Allopeas subula (L. Pfeiffer, 1839)
- Allopeas sykesi (Pilsbry, 1906)

Synonyms

- Allopeas gracilis [sic]: synonym of Allopeas gracile (T. Hutton, 1834) (incorrect grammatical agreement of specific epithet)
- Allopeas javanicum (Reeve, 1849): synonym of Paropeas achatinaceum (L. Pfeiffer, 1846) (junior synonym)
- Allopeas layardi (W. H. Benson, 1863): synonym of Eutomopeas layardi (W. H. Benson, 1863) (unaccepted combination)
- Allopeas mauritianum (Pfeiffer, 1852) - Mauritian awlsnail: synonym of Allopeas clavulinum (Potiez & Michaud, 1838) (junior subjective synonym)
- Allopeas oparanum (L. Pfeiffer, 1846): synonym of Allopeas gracile (T. Hutton, 1834)
- Allopeas pyrgiscus (L. Pfeiffer, 1861): synonym of Allopeas gracile (T. Hutton, 1834) (unaccepted > junior subjective synonym)
- Allopeas pyrgula (Schmacker & O. Boettger, 1891): synonym of Opeas pyrgula Schmacker & O. Boettger, 1891 (superseded combination)
