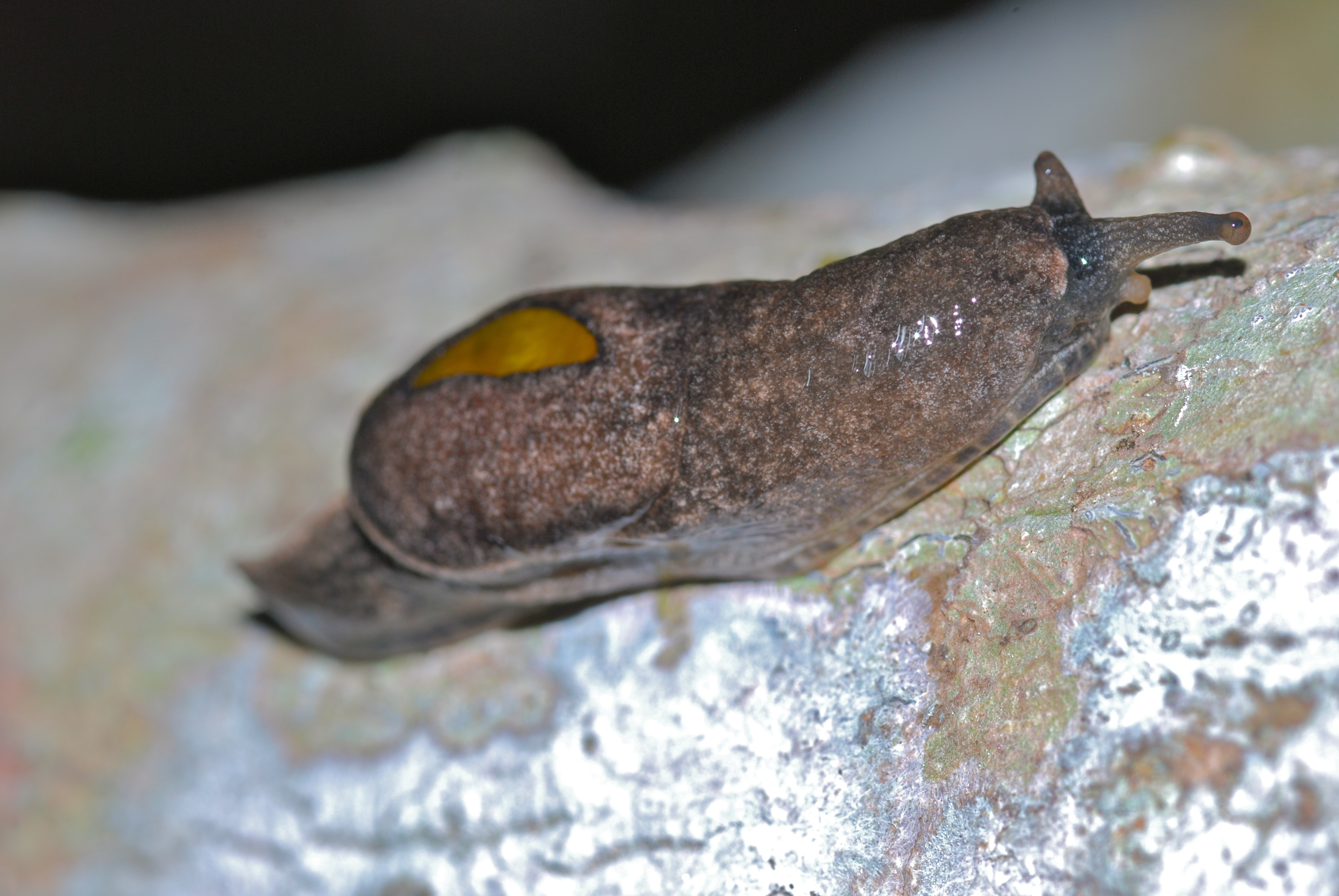

Scientific classification
- Kingdom: Animalia
- Phylum: Mollusca
- Class: Gastropoda
- Order: Stylommatophora
- Family: Ariophantidae
- Genus: Parmarion; Fischer, 1856

= Parmarion =

Genus of semislugs

Parmarion is a genus of air-breathing land semi-slugs, terrestrial pulmonate gastropod mollusks in the family Ariophantidae. Parmarion is the type genus of the Parmarioninae, which is a synonym of Ostracolethinae.

Species of snails within this family make and use love darts.

== Species ==
Species within the genus Parmarion include:

- Parmarion martensi Simroth, 1893
- Parmarion kersteni von Martens, 1869
