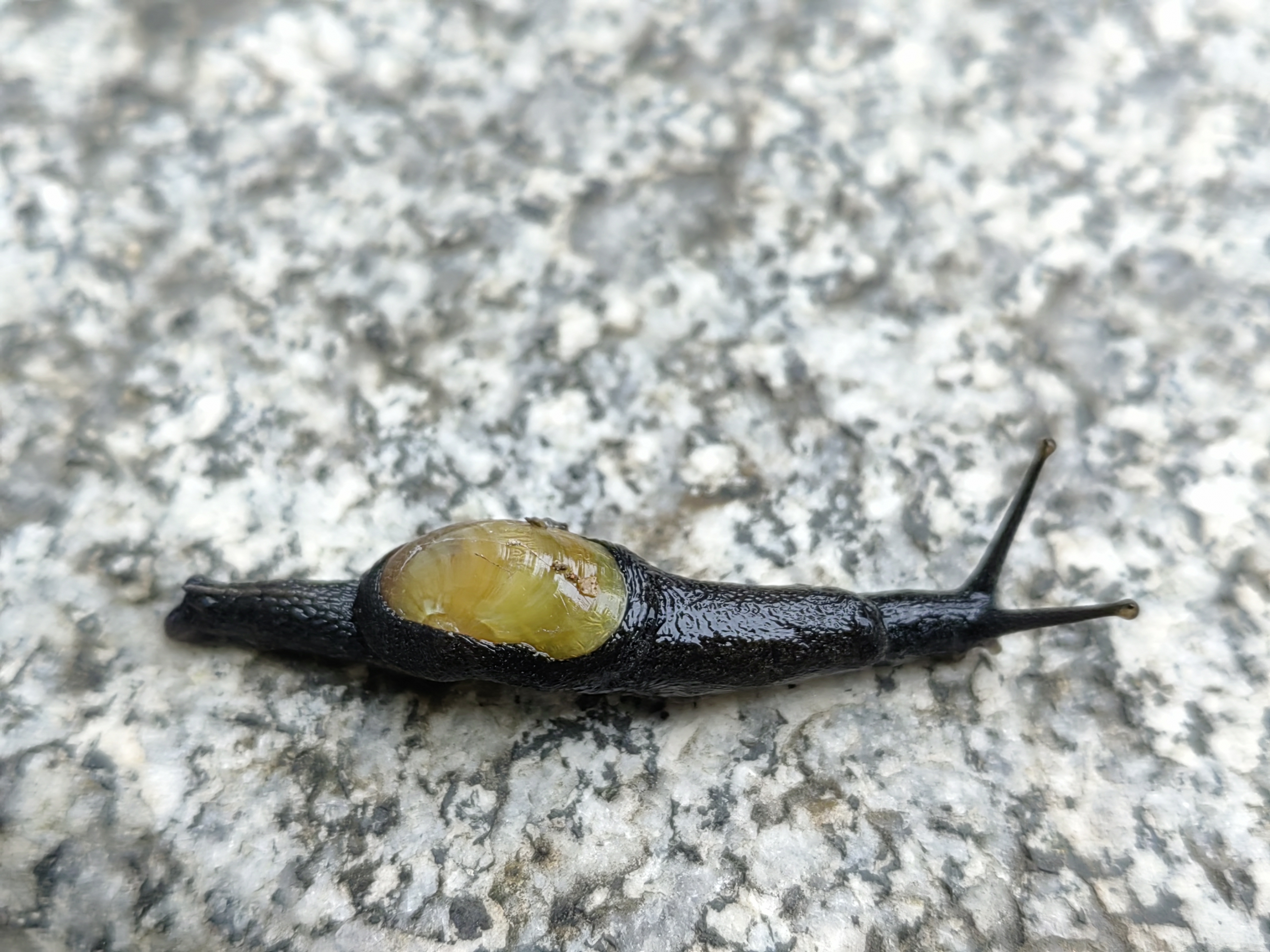
- A Parmarion martensi in Guangdong, China

Conservation status
- Secure (NatureServe)

Scientific classification
- Kingdom: Animalia
- Phylum: Mollusca
- Class: Gastropoda
- Order: Stylommatophora
- Family: Ariophantidae
- Genus: Parmarion
- Species: P. martensi

Binomial name
- Parmarion martensi Simroth, 1893

= Parmarion martensi =

Species of gastropod

Parmarion martensi is a species of air-breathing land semislug, a terrestrial pulmonate gastropod mollusk in the family Ariophantidae.

== Distribution ==
The probable native distribution of Parmarion martensi includes Southeast Asia.

This species is already established in the USA, and is considered to represent a potentially serious threat as a pest, an invasive species which could negatively affect agriculture, natural ecosystems, human health or commerce. Therefore it has been suggested that this species be given top national quarantine significance in the USA.

Parmarion martensi is considered to be a pest species in Hawaii.

== Ecology ==
Parmarion martensi is a host for the nematode Angiostrongylus cantonensis, which causes rat lungworm disease.

Parmarion martensi feeds on lettuce and on papaya in gardens in Hawaii, and is considered to be a pest.
