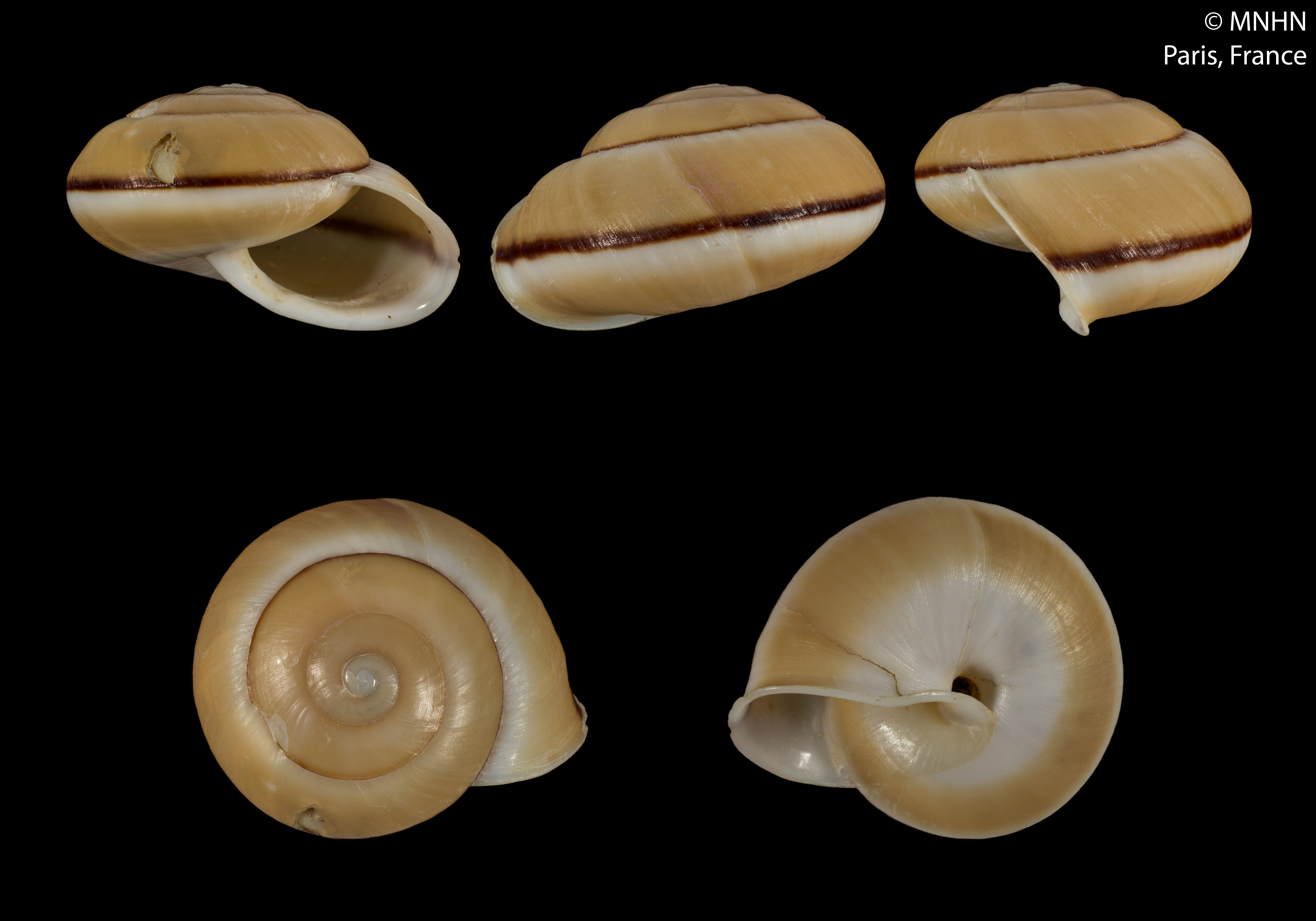
- Shell of Camaena ducae (holotype at MNHN, Paris)

Scientific classification
- Domain: Eukaryota
- Kingdom: Animalia
- Phylum: Mollusca
- Class: Gastropoda
- Order: Stylommatophora
- Superfamily: Helicoidea
- Family: Camaenidae
- Subfamily: Camaeninae
- Genus: Camaena; Albers, 1850

Type species
- Helix cicatricosa O. F. Müller, 1774

Synonyms
- Eucochlias G. Nevill, 1878; Helix (Camaena) Albers, 1850 (original rank); Helix (Camena) E. von Martens, 1860 (invalid: unjustified emendation of Camaena); Helix (Eucochlias) G. Nevill, 1878

= Camaena =

Genus of gastropods

Camaena is a genus of air-breathing, Asian land snails in the family Camaenidae.

== Species ==
Species within the genus Camaena include:

- Camaena amphicora (Mabille, 1888)
- Camaena billeti (H. Fischer, 1898)
- Camaena choboensis (Mabille, 1889)
- Camaena chuongi Thach, 2016
- Camaena cicatricosa (O. F. Müller, 1774)
- Camaena connectens Dautzenberg & H. Fischer, 1906
- Camaena contractiva (Mabille, 1889)
- Camaena cossignanii Thach, 2020
- Camaena delsaerdti Thach & F. Huber, 2018
- Camaena detianensis Zhou & Lin, 2016
- Camaena ducae Thach, 2017
- Camaena dugasti (Morlet, 1892)
- Camaena funingensis W.-C. Zhou, P. Wang & J.-H. Lin, 2020
- Camaena gabriellae (Dautzenberg & d'Hammonville, 1887)
- Camaena gaolongensis W.-C. Zhou, P. Wang & J.-H. Lin, 2020
- Camaena haematozona (Heude, 1882)
- Camaena hahni (Mabille, 1887)
- Camaena hainanensis (H. Adams, 1870)
- Camaena hemiclista (Schmacker & O. Boettger, 1894)
- Camaena hoabinhensis Thach, 2016
- Camaena huberi Thach, 2017
- Camaena illustris (L. Pfeiffer, 1863)
- Camaena inflata (Möllendorff, 1885)
- Camaena lagunae (Hidalgo, 1887)
- Camaena leonhardti (Möllendorff, 1888)
- Camaena lingyunensis Zhou & Lin, 2016
- Camaena liqianae J. Jiang, W.-B. Wu & J. He, 2014
- Camaena longsonensis (Morlet, 1891)
- Camaena marmorivaga (Mabille, 1889)
- Camaena massiei (Morlet, 1891)
- Camaena melanotrica (Mabille, 1888)
- Camaena menglunensis D.-N. Chen & G.-Q. Zhang, 1999
- Camaena mirifica (Bavay & Dautzenberg, 1908)
- Camaena ngocthachi F. Huber, 2020
- Camaena ninhbinhensis Thach, 2016
- Camaena noetlingi (E. von Martens, 1897)
- Camaena obtecta (H. Fischer, 1898)
- Camaena ochthoplax (Benson, 1860)
- Camaena onae Thach, 2016
- Camaena pachychila Pilsbry, 1893
- Camaena philippinensis (C. Semper, 1873)
- Camaena polyzonatum D.-N., Chen & G.-Q. Zhang, 1999
- Camaena poyuensis Zhou, Wang & Ding, 2016
- Camaena rugata Möllendorff, 1899
- Camaena seraphinica (Heude, 1889)
- Camaena stolidota Quadras & Möllendorff, 1894
- Camaena subgibbera (Möllendorff, 1885)
- Camaena thanhhoaensis Thach, 2016
- Camaena vanbuensis E. A. Smith, 1896
- Camaena vayssierei (Bavay & Dautzenberg, 1909)
- Camaena vorvonga (Bavay & Dautzenberg, 1900)
- Camaena vulpis (Gredler, 1887)

Taxon inquirendum

- Camaena gudei Schepman, 1919
