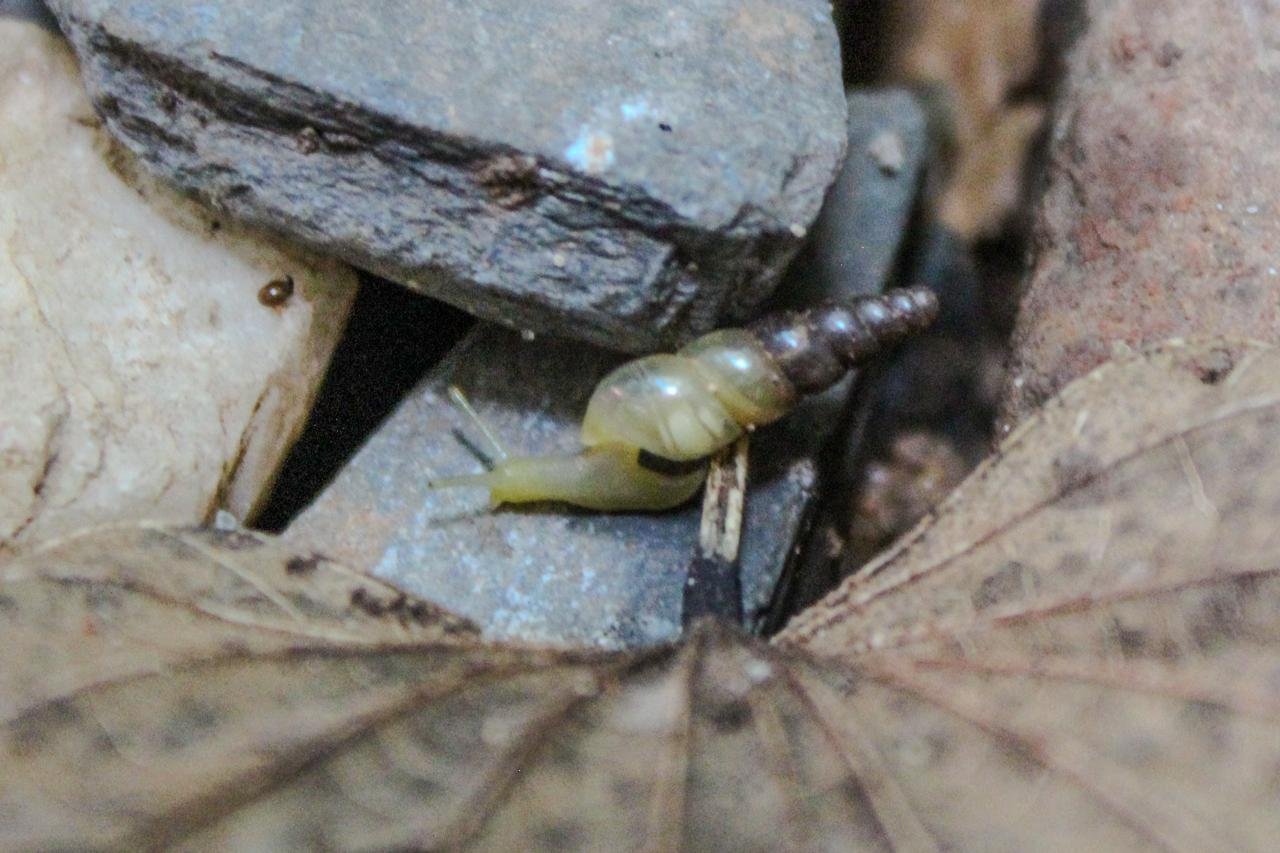
- Allopeas clavulinum in Indonesia

Conservation status
- Secure (NatureServe)

Scientific classification
- Kingdom: Animalia
- Phylum: Mollusca
- Class: Gastropoda
- Order: Stylommatophora
- Family: Achatinidae
- Genus: Allopeas
- Species: A. clavulinum

Binomial name
- Allopeas clavulinum (Potiez & Michaud, 1838)

Synonyms
- Allopeas mauritianum (L. Pfeiffer, 1853) junior subjective synonym; Allopeas prestoni var. hawaiiense (Sykes, 1904) junior subjective synonym; Bulimus clavulinus Potiez & Michaud, 1838 superseded combination; Bulimus mauritianus L. Pfeiffer, 1853 superseded combination; Lamellaxis (Allopeas) mauritianum (L. Pfeiffer, 1853) superseded combination; Lamellaxis (Tomopeas) clavulinus (Potiez & Michaud, 1838) superseded combination; Lamellaxis clavulinum [sic] incorrect grammatical agreement of specific epithet; Lamellaxis clavulinus (Potiez & Michaud, 1838); Opeas clavulinum (Potiez & Michaud, 1838) superseded combination; Opeas mauritianum (L. Pfeiffer, 1853) superseded combination; Opeas prestoni var. hawaiiensis Sykes, 1904 superseded combination; Stenogyra (Opeas) clavulinus (Potiez & Michaud, 1838) superseded combination; Subulina maurtiana (L. Pfeiffer, 1853) superseded combination

= Allopeas clavulinum =

Species of gastropod

Allopeas clavulinum, common name the spike awlsnail, is a species of small, tropical, air-breathing land snail, a terrestrial pulmonate gastropod mollusk in the family Achatinidae.

This species is also known as Lamellaxis clavulinus.

== Subspecies ==
- Allopeas clavulinum kyotoense (Pilsbry & Hirase, 1904) - Japan Earlier the subspecies was regarded as a standalone species: Allopeas kyotoense (Pilsbry & Hirase, 1904)
- Allopeas clavulinum obesispira (Pilsbry & Y. Hirase, 1904)
- Allopeas clavulinum pyrgula (Schmacker & O. Boettger, 1891): synonym of Opeas pyrgula Schmacker & O. Boettger, 1891 (superseded combination)

== Description ==
(Original description in Latin) The turreted shell is delicate, glassy, and translucent with a polished sheen. It features six convex whorls, with the body whorl being the largest. The oval aperture is angular at the top and left sides. The peristome is simple and sharp-edged. The shell has a blunt apex.

== Distribution ==
The non-indigenous distribution of this species has a wide distribution in the tropics and subtropics of East Africa. It is introduced elsewhere:

- Great Britain, as a "hothouse alien".
- the Czech Republic, where it occurs as a "hothouse alien".
- India
- Australia
- Philippines
