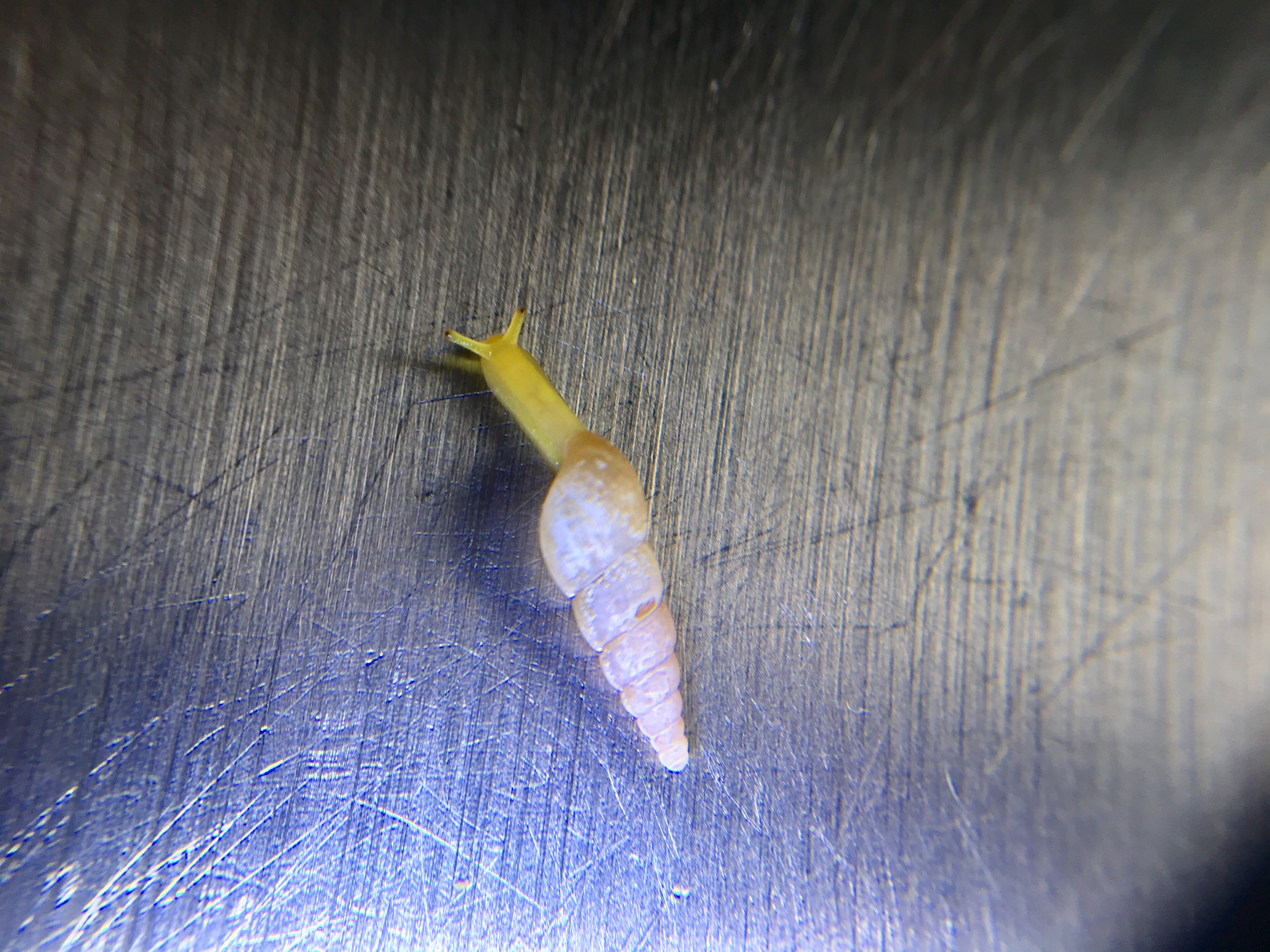
- Live specimen of Allopeas gracile
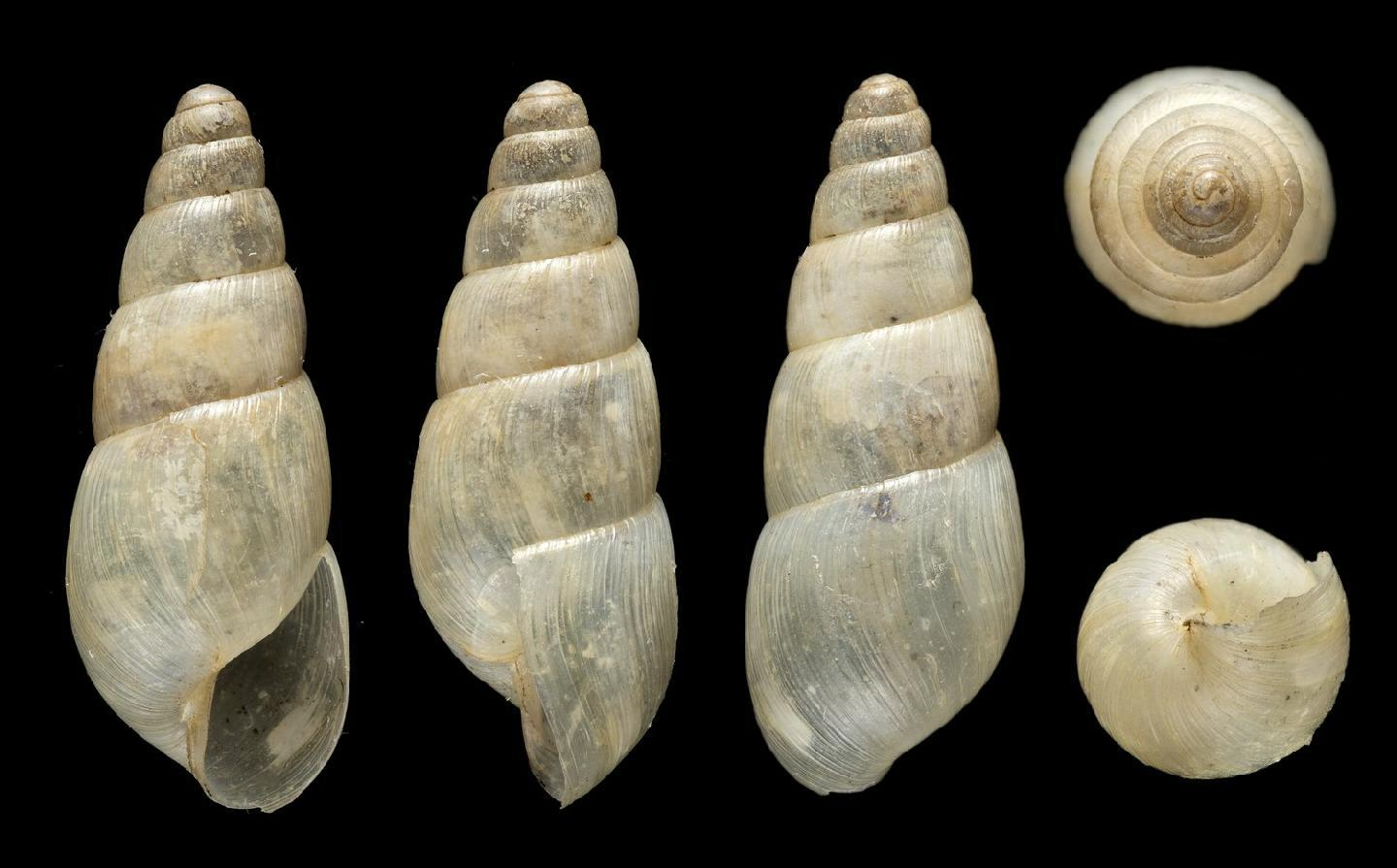
- Shell of Allopeas gracile (specimen at the Natural History Museum, London)

Conservation status
- Secure (NatureServe)

Scientific classification
- Kingdom: Animalia
- Phylum: Mollusca
- Class: Gastropoda
- Order: Stylommatophora
- Family: Achatinidae
- Genus: Allopeas
- Species: A. gracile

Binomial name
- Allopeas gracile (Hutton, 1834)
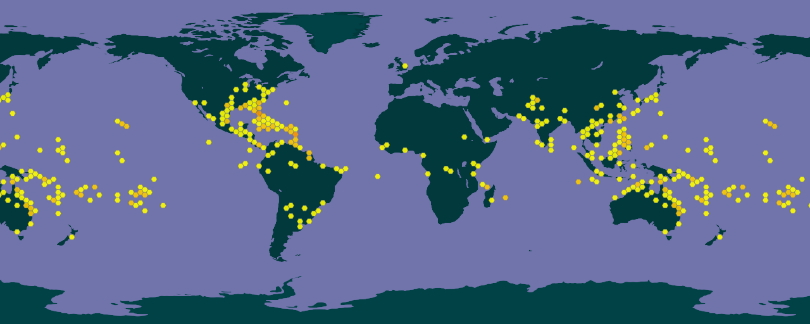

Synonyms
- See list

= Allopeas gracile =

Species of gastropod

Allopeas gracile, common name the graceful awlsnail, is a species of small, tropical, air-breathing land snail, a terrestrial pulmonate gastropod mollusk in the family Achatinidae.

== Description ==
The length of the shell varies between 9.8 mm and 12.1 mm; its diameter between 2.9 mm and 3.3 mm.

(Original description) Animal: The animal is equipped with four retractile tentacles, with the upper pair being longer and bearing eyes at their tips. The foot is elongated, rather rounded at the rear, and truncated at the front. Its color is a pale yellowish hue.

Shell: The shell is transparent, thin, and rather colorless, with a spire that tapers gradually. It consists of 12 whorls, with the body whorl equal in size to the two preceding whorls. The aperture is semi-ovate, longer than it is wide. The columellar lip is straight and slightly reflected, while the outer lip is finely edged.

(Recent description) The shell is conically elongated and slender, with a translucent, glossy surface of pale yellowish hue. It comprises 7½ to 8 whorls, tapering gradually towards a blunt apex. The protoconch consists of approximately two smooth whorls, while the subsequent whorls are adorned with obliquely arranged, fine, and densely packed riblets. The spire tapers evenly, and the whorls are flatly convex with a wide, shallow suture. The last whorl is the largest. The aperture is tall and oblong, with a thin peristome. The columellar margin near the umbilicus is slightly expanded, and the columella is straight. The umbilicus is narrowly open.

== Distribution ==
Allopeas gracile occurs throughout the tropics and subtropics worldwide.

- native to India.
- Hawaii & islands of Polynesia (naturalized)
- Australia (New South Wales, Northern Territory, Queensland, Western Australia)
- West Indies
- southern Mexico
- Central and South America
- Dominica - introduced. First reported in 2009.
- Tanzania

It is also found living in greenhouses in other areas, as a "hothouse exotic".

== Synonyms ==
- Achatina mandralisci Calcara, 1840 junior subjective synonym
- Aclis californica Bartsch, 1927 junior subjective synonym
- Allopeas gracile var. panayensis (L. Pfeiffer, 1846) junior subjective synonym
- Allopeas gracilis [sic] incorrect grammatical agreement of specific epithet
- Allopeas pyrgiscus (L. Pfeiffer, 1861) junior subjective synonym
- Bulimus (Stenogyra) johanninus Morelet, 1877 junior subjective synonym
- Bulimus apex Mousson, 1849 junior subjective synonym
- Bulimus artensis Gassies, 1866 junior subjective synonym
- Bulimus diaphanus Gassies, 1859 junior subjective synonym (invalid: junior homonym of...)
- Bulimus gracilis T. Hutton, 1834 superseded combination
- Bulimus hortensis C. B. Adams, 1851 junior subjective synonym
- Bulimus junceus A. Gould, 1846 junior subjective synonym
- Bulimus oparanus L. Pfeiffer, 1846 junior subjective synonym
- Bulimus panayensis L. Pfeiffer, 1846 junior subjective synonym
- Bulimus pyrgiscus L. Pfeiffer, 1861 junior subjective synonym
- Bulimus souverbianus Gassies, 1863 junior objective synonym
- Lamellaxis (Allopeas) gracilis (T. Hutton, 1834) superseded combination
- Lamellaxis gracilis (T. Hutton, 1834) superseded combination
- Limicolaria bourguignati Paladilhe, 1872 junior subjective synonym
- Opeas acutius (K. Miller, 1879) junior subjective synonym
- Opeas apex (Mousson, 1849) junior subjective synonym
- Opeas gracile (T. Hutton, 1834) superseded combination
- Opeas oparanum (L. Pfeiffer, 1846) junior subjective synonym
- Opeas tangaense d'Ailly, 1910 junior subjective synonym
- Stenogyra (Opeas) acutius K. Miller, 1879 junior subjective synonym
- Stenogyra (Opeas) gracile (T. Hutton, 1834) superseded combination
- Stenogyra (Opeas) panayensis (L. Pfeiffer, 1846) junior subjective synonym
- Stenogyra gracilis (T. Hutton, 1834) superseded combination
- Stenogyra juncea (A. Gould, 1846) junior subjective synonym
- Stenogyra panayensis (L. Pfeiffer, 1846) junior subjective synonym
- Stenogyra upolensis Mousson, 1865 junior subjective synonym
