= Caramujo =

Coordinates: 22°53′18″S 43°3′55″W

Caramujo is a working class neighborhood in the northern zone of Niterói, Brazil, a municipality in the Eastern Metropolitan Region of Rio de Janeiro, where Florália is located. It borders between Fonseca, Ititioca, Santa Bárbara, Sapê, Baldeador and Viçoso Jardim, in an area that constitutes the so-called as the "sea of hills", which is characterized by the succession of valleys and low-lying hills, as well as the occupation of slopes due to the scarcity of flat areas.

== Etymology ==
The word Caramujo comes from the fact that there used to be an only single access and exit route to the neighborhood, Dr. Nilo Peçanha Street, and others were quite winding, making the place where it was necessary to "take many turns" to reach the destination, or to return to the point of origin.

The word Caramujo also in Portuguese language means snail. According to the SciELO Brazil, the invasive of the African snail name Fulica has been introduced in Brazil from southern and southeastern states on at least three occasions. Its distribution currently had cover 24 of the 26 states and the Federal District. Dense populations of this species have been causing discomfort to the human populations, which also damage the gardens and small plantations, and acting as transmitters of the two zoonoses (abdominally angiostrongyliasis and eosinophilic meningoencephalitis), and other parasitic diseases of veterinary concern. In the present study, it present a new occurrences of a A. fulica in the state of Rio de Janeiro, as well as the data on the larvae of nematodes of medical and veterinary interest found in specimens of this species collected in this state.
