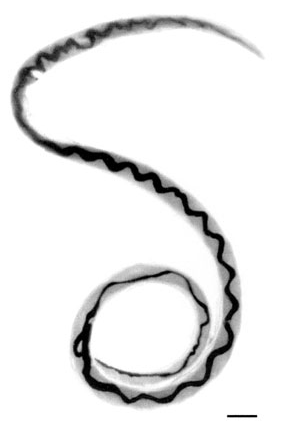
- Adult female worm of Angiostrongylus cantonensis with characteristic barber-pole appearance (anterior end of worm is to the top). Scale bar is 1 mm.

Scientific classification
- Kingdom: Animalia
- Phylum: Nematoda
- Class: Chromadorea
- Order: Rhabditida
- Family: Angiostrongylidae
- Genus: Angiostrongylus
- Species: A. cantonensis

Binomial name
- Angiostrongylus cantonensis (Chen, 1935)

Synonyms
- Pulmonema cantonensis Chen, 1935

= Angiostrongylus cantonensis =

Species of roundworm

Angiostrongylus cantonensis is a nematode (roundworm) parasite that causes angiostrongyliasis, an infection that is the most common cause of eosinophilic meningitis in Southeast Asia and the Pacific Basin. The nematode commonly resides in the pulmonary arteries of rats, giving it the common name rat lungworm. Snails and slugs are the primary intermediate hosts, where larvae develop until they are infectious.

Humans are incidental hosts of this roundworm, and may become infected through ingestion of larvae in raw or undercooked snails or other vectors, or from contaminated water and vegetables. The larvae are then transported via the blood to the central nervous system, where they are the most common cause of eosinophilic meningitis, a serious condition that can lead to death or permanent brain and nerve damage. Angiostrongyliasis is an infection of increasing public health importance, as globalization contributes to the geographic spread of the disease.

== History ==
First described by Chinese parasitologist Hsin-Tao Chen (1904–1977) in 1935, after examining Cantonese rat specimens, the nematode Angiostrongylus cantonensis was identified in the cerebrospinal fluid of a patient with eosinophilic meningitis by Nomura and Lim in Taiwan in 1944. They noted that raw food eaten by the patient may have been contaminated by rats.

== Infectious agent ==
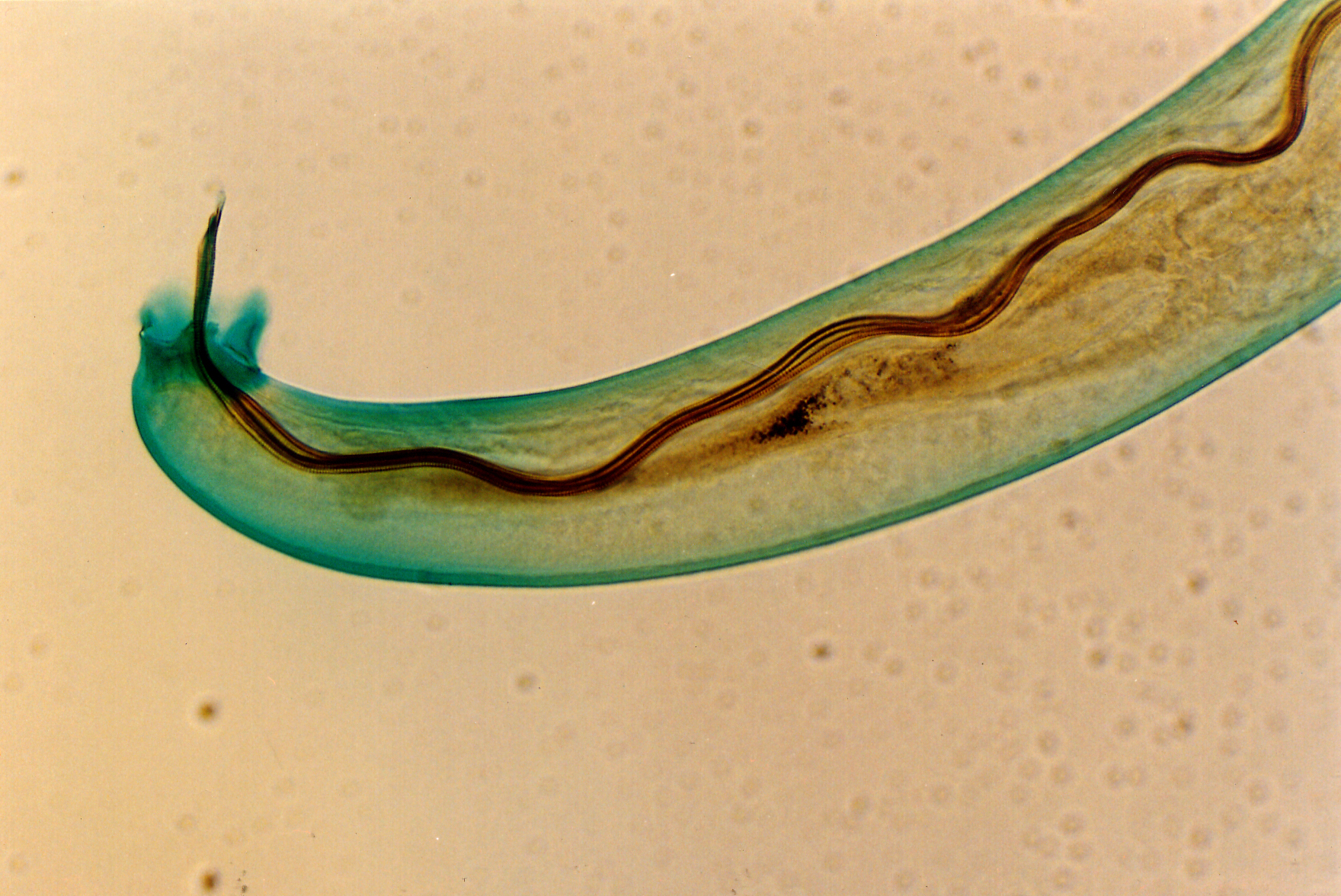
Male A. cantonensis

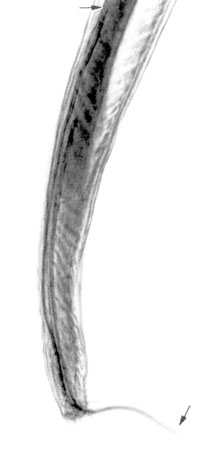
Tail of adult male of A. cantonensis, showing copulatory bursa and long spicules (arrows), scale bar is 85 μm

A. cantonensis is a helminth of the phylum Nematoda, order Strongylida, and superfamily Metastrongyloidea. Nematodes are roundworms characterized by a tough outer cuticle, unsegmented bodies, and a fully developed gastrointestinal tract. The order Strongylida includes hookworms and lungworms. Metastrongyloidea are characterized as 2-cm-long, slender, threadlike worms that reside in the lungs of the definitive host. Angiostrongylus costaricensis is a closely related worm that causes intestinal angiostrongyliasis in Central and South America.

== Epidemiology and pathogenesis ==
Following World War II, A. cantonensis spread throughout Southeast Asia and Western Pacific Islands, including Australia, Melanesia, Micronesia, and Polynesia. Cases were soon reported in New Caledonia, the Philippines, Rarotonga, Saipan, Sumatra, Taiwan, and Tahiti. In the 1960s, even more cases were reported from the region from locations such as Cambodia, Guam, Hawaii, Java, Thailand, Sarawak, Vietnam, and Vanuatu.

In 1961, an epidemiological study of eosinophilic meningitis in humans was conducted by Rosen, Laigret, and Bories, who hypothesized that the parasite causing these infections was carried by fish. However, Alicata noted that raw fish was consumed by large numbers of people in Hawaii without apparent consequences, and patients presenting with meningitis symptoms had a history of eating raw snails or prawns in the weeks before presenting with symptoms. This observation, along with epidemiology and autopsy of infected brains, confirmed A. cantonensis infection in humans as the cause of the majority of eosinophilic meningitis cases in Southeast Asia and the Pacific Islands.

Since then, cases of A. cantonensis infestations have appeared in American Samoa, Australia, Hong Kong, Bombay, Fiji, Hawaii, Honshu, India, Kyushu, New Britain, Okinawa, Ryukyu Islands, Western Samoa, and most recently mainland China. Other sporadic occurrences of the parasite in its rat hosts have been reported in Cuba, Egypt, Louisiana, Madagascar, Nigeria, and Puerto Rico. In 2023 it was detected for the first time in continental Europe in the city of Valencia on the Spanish mainland.

In 2010, an Australian 19 year old contracted A. cantonensis after consuming a slug on a dare while drunk. This led to him entering a coma for nearly 14 months and becoming paralyzed. This culminated in his death in 2018.

In 2013, A. cantonensis was confirmed present in Florida, USA, where its range and prevalence are expanding. In 2018, a case was found in a New Yorker who had visited Hawaii.

In recent years, the parasite has been shown to be proliferating at an alarming rate due to modern food-consumption trends and global transportation of food products. Scientists are calling for a more thorough study of the epidemiology of A. cantonensis, stricter food-safety policies, and the increase of knowledge on how to properly consume products commonly infested by the parasite, such as snails and slugs that act as intermediate hosts or those that act as paratenic hosts, such as fish, frogs, or freshwater prawns.

Ingestion of food items that can be contaminated by the mucus excretions of intermediate or paratenic hosts, such as snails and slugs, or by the feces of rats that act as definitive hosts, can lead to infection of A. cantonensis. The most common route of infection of A. cantonesis in humans is by ingestion of either intermediate or paratenic hosts of the larvae. Unwashed fruits and vegetables, especially romaine lettuce, can be contaminated with snail and slug mucus or can result in accidental ingestion of these intermediate and paratenic hosts. These items need to be properly washed and handled to prevent accidental ingestion of A. cantonensis larvae or the larvae-containing hosts.

The best mechanism of prevention of A. cantonesis outbreak is to institute an aggressive control of snail and slug population, proper cooking of intermediate and paratenic hosts such as fish, freshwater prawn, frogs, molluscs, and snails along with proper food-handling techniques. The common prevention techniques for diarrheal illness are very effective in preventing A. cantonensis infection.

Not much is known about why it targets the brain in humans, but a chemically induced chemotaxis has been implicated recently. Acetylcholine has been previously reported to enhance motility of this worm via nicotinic acetylcholine receptors. Experimental assays in animal models are needed to validate a chemically induced chemotaxis by use of anticholinergic drugs to prevent cerebral infection following infections by A. cantonesis.

== Hosts ==
Intermediate hosts of larvae of for A. cantonensis include:

- Land snails: Thelidomus aspera from Jamaica, Pleurodonte sp. from Jamaica, Sagda sp. from Jamaica, Poteria sp. from Jamaica, Achatina fulica, Satsuma mercatoria, Acusta despecta, Bradybaena brevispira, Bradybaena circulus Bradybaena ravida, Bradybaena similaris, Plectotropis appanata and Parmarion martensi from Okinawa and Hawaii, Camaena cicatricosa, Trichochloritis rufopila, Trichochloritis hungerfordianus and Cyclophorus spp.
- Freshwater snails: Pila spp., Pomacea canaliculata, Cipangopaludina chinensis, Bellamya aeruginosa and Bellamya quadrata ,Pomacea maculata
- Slugs: Limax maximus, Limax flavus Deroceras laeve, Deroceras reticulatum, Laevicaulis alte, Sarasinula plebeia, Vaginulus yuxjsjs, Lehmannia valentiana, Phiolomycus bilineatus, Macrochlamys loana, Meghimatium bilineatum and other species of slugs.

Definitive hosts of A. cantonensis include wild rodents, especially the brown rat (Rattus norvegicus) and the black rat (Rattus rattus).

Paratenic hosts of A. cantonensis include the predatory land flatworm Platydemus manokwari and the amphibians, Bufo asiaticus, Rana catesbeiana, Polypedates leucomystax and Fejervarya limnocharis.

In 2004, a captive yellow-tailed black cockatoo (Calyptorhynchus funereus) and two free-living tawny frogmouths (Podargus strigoides) suffering neurological symptoms were shown to have the parasite. They were the first avian hosts discovered for the organism. In 2018, in Mallorca two North African hedgehogs with signs of acute neurological disease were found to have A. cantonensis in their brains, one of them with a gravid female. It was the first report of hedgehogs as hosts of Angiostrongylus.

The Hawaiʻi Department of Health states that freshwater opihi can carry the parasite, as well as other aquatic organisms such as prawns, frogs, and water monitor lizards. House pets may interact with A. cantonensis-carrying animals but this is not well studied. Cats are known to carry and spread feline lungworm in rat and snail interactions.

== Pathogenesis of human angiostrongylosis ==
The presence of parasitic worms burrowed in the neural tissue of the human central nervous system (CNS) causes complications. All of the following result in damage to the CNS:

1. Direct mechanical damage to neural tissue from the worms' motion
2. Toxic byproducts such as nitrogenous waste
3. Antigens released by dead and living parasites

== Eosinophilic meningitis ==
Although the clinical disease caused by Angiostrongylus invasion into the CNS is commonly referred to as "eosinophilic meningitis", the actual pathophysiology is of a meningoencephalitis with invasion not just of the meninges, or superficial lining of the brain, but also deeper brain tissue. Initial invasion through the lining of the brain, the meninges, may cause a typical inflammation of the meninges and a classic meningitis picture of headache, stiff neck, and often fever. The parasites subsequently invade deeper into the brain tissue, causing specific localizing neurological symptoms depending on where in the brain parenchyma they migrate. Neurologic findings and symptoms wax and wane as initial damage is done by the physical in-migration of the worms and secondary damage is done by the inflammatory response to the presence of dead and dying worms. This inflammation can lead in the short term to paralysis, bladder dysfunction, visual disturbance, and nerve damage. In the long term, inflammation can lead to permanent nerve damage, intellectual disability, permanent brain damage, or death.

Eosinophilic meningitis is commonly defined by the increased number of eosinophils in the cerebrospinal fluid (CSF). In most cases, eosinophil levels rise to 10 or more eosinophils per μl in the CSF, accounting for at least 10% of the total CSF leukocyte (white blood cell) count. The chemical analysis of the CSF typically resembles the findings in "aseptic meningitis" with slightly elevated protein levels, normal glucose levels, and negative bacterial cultures. Presence of a significantly decreased glucose on CSF analysis is an indicator of severe meningoencephalitis and may indicate a poor medical outcome. Initial CSF analysis early in the disease process may occasionally show no increase of eosinophils, only to have classical increases in eosinophils in subsequent CSF analysis. Caution should be advised in using eosinophilic meningitis as the only criterion for diagnosing angiostrongylus infestation in someone with classic symptoms, as the disease evolves with the migration of the worms into the CNS.

Eosinophils are specialized white blood cells of the granulocytic cell line, which contain granules in their cytoplasm. These granules contain proteins that are toxic to parasites. When these granules degranulate, or break down, chemicals are released that combat parasites such as A. cantonensis. Eosinophils, which are located throughout the body, are guided to sites of inflammation by chemokines when the body is infested with parasites such as A. cantonensis. Once at the site of inflammation, type 2 cytokines are released from helper T cells, which communicate with the eosinophils, signaling them to activate. Once activated, eosinophils can begin the process of degranulation, releasing their toxic proteins in the fight against the foreign parasite.

=== Clinical signs and symptoms ===
According to a group case study, the most common symptoms in mild eosinophilic meningitis tend to be headache (with 100% of people in the study suffering from this symptom), photophobia or visual disturbance (92%), neck stiffness (83%), fatigue (83%), hyperesthesias (75%), vomiting (67%), and paresthesias (50%). Incubation period is often 3 weeks, but can be 3–36 days and even 80 days.

Possible clinical signs and symptoms of mild and severe eosinophilic meningitis are:

- Fever is often minor or absent, but the presence of high fever suggests severe disease.
- Headaches are progressive and severe, a bitemporal character in the frontal or occipital lobe.
- Meningismus – neck stiffness
- Photophobia – sensitivity to light
- Muscle weakness and fatigue
- Nausea with or without vomiting
- Paresthesias – tingling, prickling, or numbing of skin, may last for several weeks or months
- Hyperesthesia – severe sensitivity to touch; may last for several weeks or months
- Radiculitis – pain irradiated along certain areas of skin
- Bladder dysfunction with urinary retention
- Constipation
- Brudziński's sign
- Vertigo
- Blindness
- Paralysis localized to one area; e.g., paralysis of extraocular muscles and facial palsy
- General paralysis (flaccid) often ascending in nature starting with the feet and progressing upwards to involve the entire body
- Coma
- Death

=== Treatment ===
The severity and clinical course of Angiostrongylus disease depends significantly on the ingested load of third-stage larvae, creating great variability from case to case, making clinical trials difficult to design, and effectiveness of treatments difficult to discern. Typical conservative medical management including analgesics and sedatives provide minimal relief for the headaches and hyperesthesias. Removing cerebrospinal fluid at regular 3- to 7-day intervals is the only proven method of significantly reducing intracranial pressure and can be used for symptomatic treatment of headaches. This process may be repeated until improvement is shown. There is growing evidence of moderate quality that suggests corticosteroid therapy using prednisolone or dexamethasone has beneficial effect in treating the CNS symptoms related to A. cantonensis infections. Although early research did not show treatment with antihelminthic agents (parasite-killing drugs) such as thiobendazole or albendazole effective in improving the clinical course of the illness, a number of recent studies from Thailand and China show that the combination of glucocorticoids and antihelminthics is safe and decreases the duration of headaches and the number of patients who had significant headache. Although the addition of antihelminthic agents for management of A. cantonensis infection has a theoretical risk of precipitating a neurologic crisis by releasing an overwhelming load of antigens through simultaneous death of the larvae, no study has shown this to exist in the clinical setting. Additionally, the failure to kill parasites before they attempt to migrate out of the CNS increases the risk of mechanical damage by migrating larvae. Although combination therapy using albendazole and prednisolone has no significant advantage compared to treatment using prednisolone alone in mild cases, the treatment with antihelminthics is demonstrably safe and may have significant benefit for patients with high parasite loads at risk for permanent disability or death.

=== Diagnosis ===
The diagnosis of disease caused by A. cantonensis infestation is often difficult and relies heavily on the history of a likely ingestion of a commonly infested host and the presence of typical features of the disease. The presumptive diagnosis is particularly strong when eosinophilic meningoencephalitis can be confirmed. The diagnosis of eosinophilic meningitis can be arrived at through detection of elevated cranial pressure and increased numbers of eosinophils. The diagnosis of the cause of eosinophilic meningitis and the presence of A. cantonensis is remarkably more difficult. A spinal tap, or a sample of CSF, must be taken to search for A. cantonensis worms or larvae. A. cantonensis is undetectable in the CSF of more than half of the infected individuals. Current methods of detecting specific antigens associated with A. cantonensis are also unreliable. Consequently, alternative approaches to detect antigen-antibody reactions are being explored, such as immuno-PCR. A rapid dot-blot ELISA test is also available for quick, effective, and economical on-site diagnosis of A. cantonensis.
