= Albert Mead =

Albert Mead may refer to:

- Albert E. Mead (1861–1913), American lawyer and politician, governor of Washington
- Albert R. Mead (1915–2009), malacologist
