= Kimlan Foods =

Taiwanese food products company

Kimlan Foods Co., Ltd.
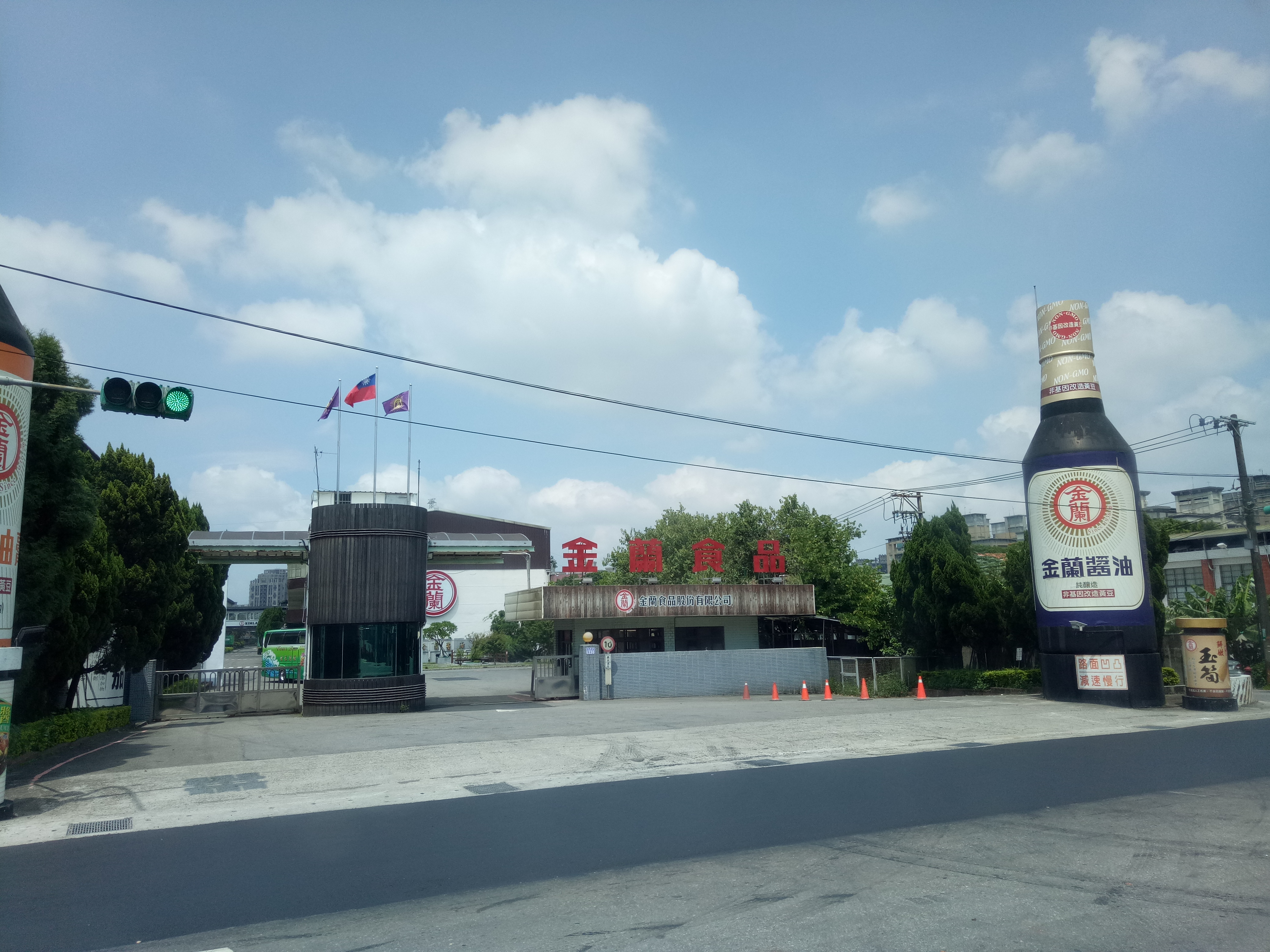
- Trade name: Kimlan
- Native name: 金蘭食品股份有限公司
- Formerly: Datung Company
- Company type: Private
- Industry: Food
- Founded: 8 May 1936; 90 years ago
- Founder: Han Chung
- Headquarters: Daxi, Taoyuan, Taiwan
- Key people: Zhong Chunming 鍾淳名 (Chairman)
- Products: Soy sauce
- Website: www.kimlan.com

Chinese name
- Traditional Chinese: 金蘭食品股份有限公司
- Simplified Chinese: 金兰食品股份有限公司
Transcriptions
Standard Mandarin
- Hanyu Pinyin: Jīn Lán Shí Pǐn Gǔ Fèn Yǒu Xiàn Gōng Sī
Southern Min
- Hokkien POJ: Kimlân si̍tphín kó͘hūniúhān kongsi

Kimlan Foods Co., Ltd. (Chinese: 金蘭食品股份有限公司) is a Taiwanese food products company headquartered in Daxi District, Taoyuan City, Taiwan. As of 2008 it is the largest soy sauce manufacturer in Taiwan. The Chinese-language Reader's Digest ranked Kimlan as a winner of the gold awards in 2008.

== History ==
The company was originally founded as "Datung Company" on 8 May 1936 by Mr. Han Chung. In 1970, the company was renamed as Kimlan Soy Sauce. In 1987, it was renamed again to "Kimlan Foods Co., Ltd".

In 1985, reports indicated that several high-level employees who were members of the founding Han Chung family fell seriously ill after consuming raw giant African land snails, leading to multiple fatalities. The cause of death was later identified as infection by the parasitic nematode Angiostrongylus cantonensis, commonly known as the rat lungworm.
