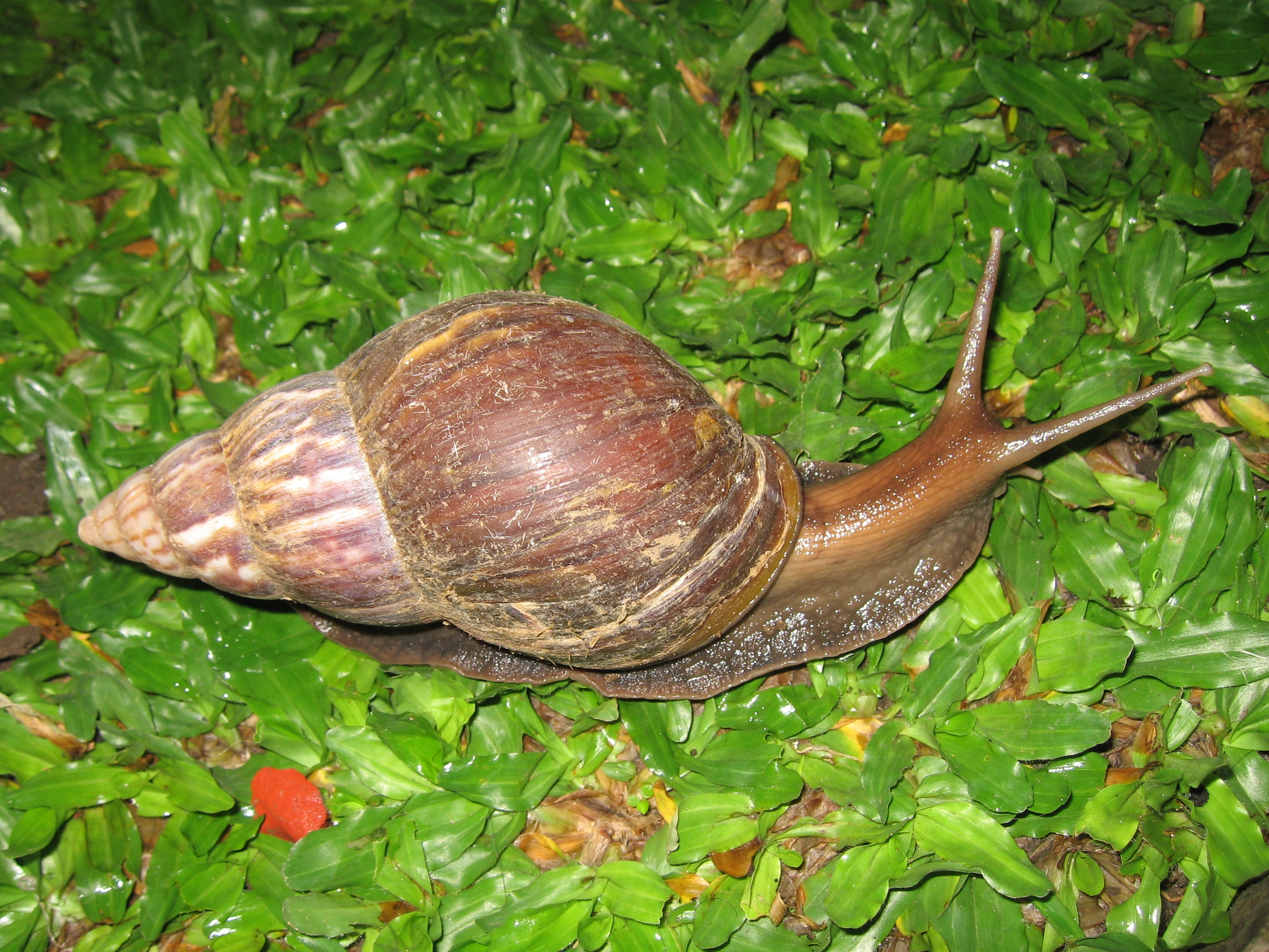
- Lissachatina fulica in Bali, Indonesia

Conservation status
- Secure (NatureServe)

Scientific classification
- Kingdom: Animalia
- Phylum: Mollusca
- Class: Gastropoda
- Order: Stylommatophora
- Family: Achatinidae
- Genus: Lissachatina
- Species: L. fulica

Binomial name
- Lissachatina fulica (Férussac, 1821)

Synonyms
- Achatina (Lissachatina) fulica (Férussac, 1821)· accepted, alternate representation; Achatina fulica (Férussac, 1821); Achatina (Lissachatina) fulica fulica Bowdich, 1822 (unaccepted combination); Achatina acuta Lamarck, 1822 (junior synonym); Achatina couroupa Lesson, 1831 (junior synonym); Achatina fasciata Deshayes, 1831 (junior synonym); Achatina fulica Bowdich, 1822 (superseded combination); Achatina fulva Deshayes, 1838 (invalid: not Achatina fulva Beck, 1837); Achatina mauritiana Lamarck, 1822 (junior synonym); Achatina mauritiana var. sinistrorsa Grateloup, 1840 (junior synonym); Achatina redivina Mabille, 1901 (junior synonym); Achatina zebra var. macrostoma Beck, 1837 (junior synonym); Helix (Cochlitoma) fulicna Férussac, 1821 (basionym); Helix fulica Férussac, 1821 (original combination)

= Lissachatina fulica =

Species of land snail

Lissachatina fulica is a species of large land snail that belongs in the subfamily Achatininae of the family Achatinidae. It is also known as the giant African land snail. It shares the common name "giant African snail" with other species of snails such as Achatina achatina and Archachatina marginata. This snail species has been considered a significant cause of pest issues around the world. It is a federally prohibited species in the U.S., as it is illegal to sell or possess. Internationally, it is the most frequently occurring invasive species of snail.

Outside of its native range, this snail thrives in many types of habitat with mild climates. It feeds voraciously and is a vector for plant pathogens, causing severe damage to agricultural crops and native plants. It competes with native snail taxa, is a nuisance pest of urban areas, and spreads human disease.

== Subspecies ==
Subspecies within this species:

- L. f. castanea (Lamarck, 1822)
- L. f. coloba (Pilsbry, 1904)
- L. f. hamillei (Petit, 1859)
- L. f. rodatzi (Dunker, 1852)
- L. f. umbilicata (Nevill, 1879)

== Distribution ==
The species is native to East Africa, but it has been widely introduced to other parts of the world through the pet trade, as a food resource, and by accidental introduction.

Within Africa, the snail can be found along the eastern coast of South Africa, extending northward into Somalia. However, some of its distribution into northern Africa may be due to human introduction, starting in northern Mozambique, Tanzania, Kenya, and extending through Somalia into Ethiopia. The snail has been reported in Morocco, Ghana, and the Ivory Coast as early as the 1980s.

In 1961, Albert R. Mead, published the seminal work entitled "The Giant African Snail: A Problem in Economic Malacology". This book compiled known information on the snail, as well as a detailed overview on its global distribution.

Prior to 1800, the snail was found in Madagascar, spreading westward to Mauritius, reaching Réunion in 1821, then to Seychelles in 1840. In 1847, they were introduced to India and in 1900 in Sri Lanka. In 1911, the snail was present in northern Malaysia, possibly from India or Myanmar. In 1922, the snail was identified in Singapore although it may have been present as early as 1917. In 1925, the snail was shipped to Java, from which it spread across Indonesia. In 1928, the snail was observed in Sarawak.

This species has been found in China since 1931 and its initial point of distribution in China was Xiamen. The snail has also been established on Pratas Island, of Taiwan.

The species was established in Hawaii by 1936. The snail was present in Papua New Guinea by 1946, spreading from New Ireland and New Britain to the mainland by 1976–77. By 1967 the snail was present in Tahiti, spreading through New Caledonia and Vanuatu by 1972 into French Polynesia by 1978, including American Samoa.

By 1990, the snail was reported in Samoa and the Federated States of Micronesia in 1998.

In 1984, L. fulica was found established in the French West Indies, spreading across Guadeloupe and by 1988 arriving in Martinique. In 2008, populations of L. fulica were reported in Trinidad but were greatly reduced by 2010. In 2014, the snail was reported in Havana, Cuba.

In Brazil, the first introduction of L. fulica came in 1988 in Paraná. By 2007, it was recorded in 23 of the 26 Brazilian states. In 2006–2008, the snail was recorded in Ecuador, in Pichincha, and may have been present at least 10 years prior in 'snail farms'. The presence of the snail in Colombia was reported by 2008–2009. Although the time of the initial introduction is unknown, it has been registered in all regions of the country by 2012. Live specimens were found in Piura, Peru, around 2008 as well. The snail may be present in Venezuela and was reported in Puerto Iguazú, Argentina in 2010.

The species has been observed in Bhutan (Gyelposhing, Mongar), where it is an invasive species since 2006 and their number increased drastically since 2008.

In the contiguous United States, the snail had been reported in Miami, Florida, in 1966 and 2011, in both cases requiring nearly a decade to eradicate. Three separate introductions identified in June 2022 (north of Tampa), December 2022 (Fort Myers), and June 2023 (north of Miami) are presently under quarantine as eradication efforts continue.

== Description ==
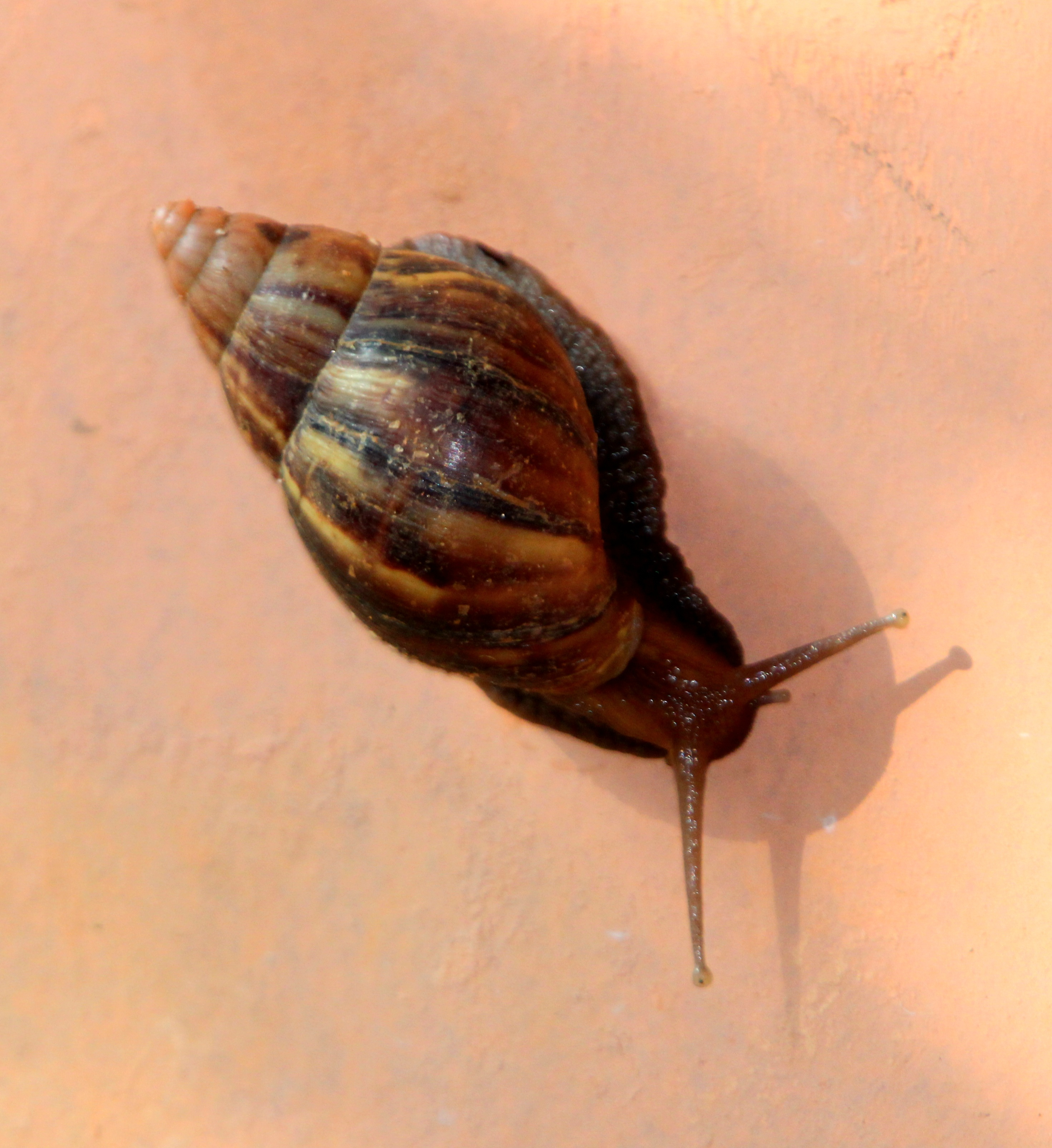
African giant snail from Sri Lanka

The eggs of Lissachatina fulica are pure white and opaque but may be slightly yellowish or even somewhat transparent. The eggs have a thin, calcareous shell, and are about 5 mm long and 4 mm wide.

A newly hatched snail is called a neonate. When the giant African land snail hatches, its shell is about 5 to 5.5 mm long, consisting of 2.5 whorls. As the snail grows, its shell extends either clockwise (dextral) or counter-clockwise (sinistral), coiling and creating whirls as the snail ages.

Younger snails will have a vertical pattern on their shell (wrinkles, welts, and criss-crossing patterns) of brown and cream color bands. As the snail grows, the new whorls of its shell will be smooth and glossy, consisting of only a brown color. A fully adult snail is around 7 cm (2.8 in) in diameter and 20 cm (7.9 in) or more in length, making it one of the largest of all extant land snails. An adult snail may be expected to have 7–9 whorls, but this is not necessarily a reliable indicator of age; nor is the width of the snail's peristome (the shell's lip at the aperture or opening of the shell), which was traditionally used to measure age, as it varies as well.

While the snail most typically has a brown shell with cream sections at its apex, the shell coloration is highly variable. A buttery yellow body (also called pedal or foot) is possible, rather than the typical brownish grey body and brown shell. This variety is nicknamed the 'white jade snail' in China. The snail also comes in the 'golden' variety, sometimes considered an albino type; with a yellow body and yellow shell.

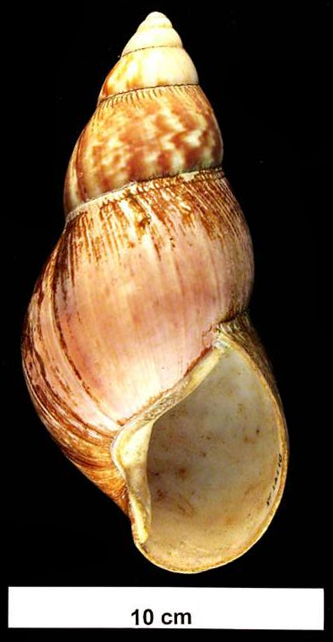
Apertural view of the shell

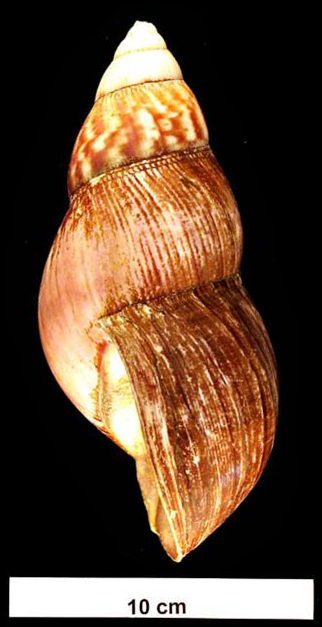
Lateral view of the shell

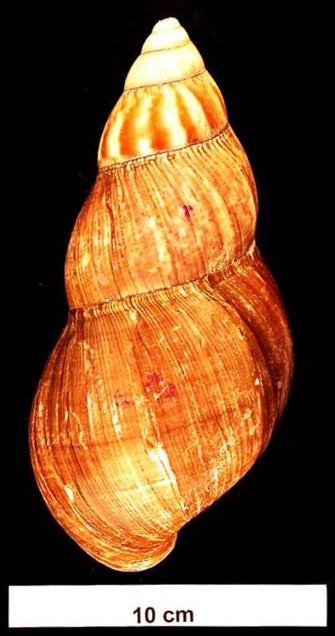
Abapertural view of the shell

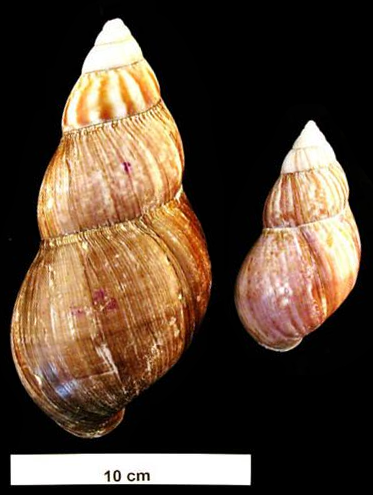
Adult shell size range

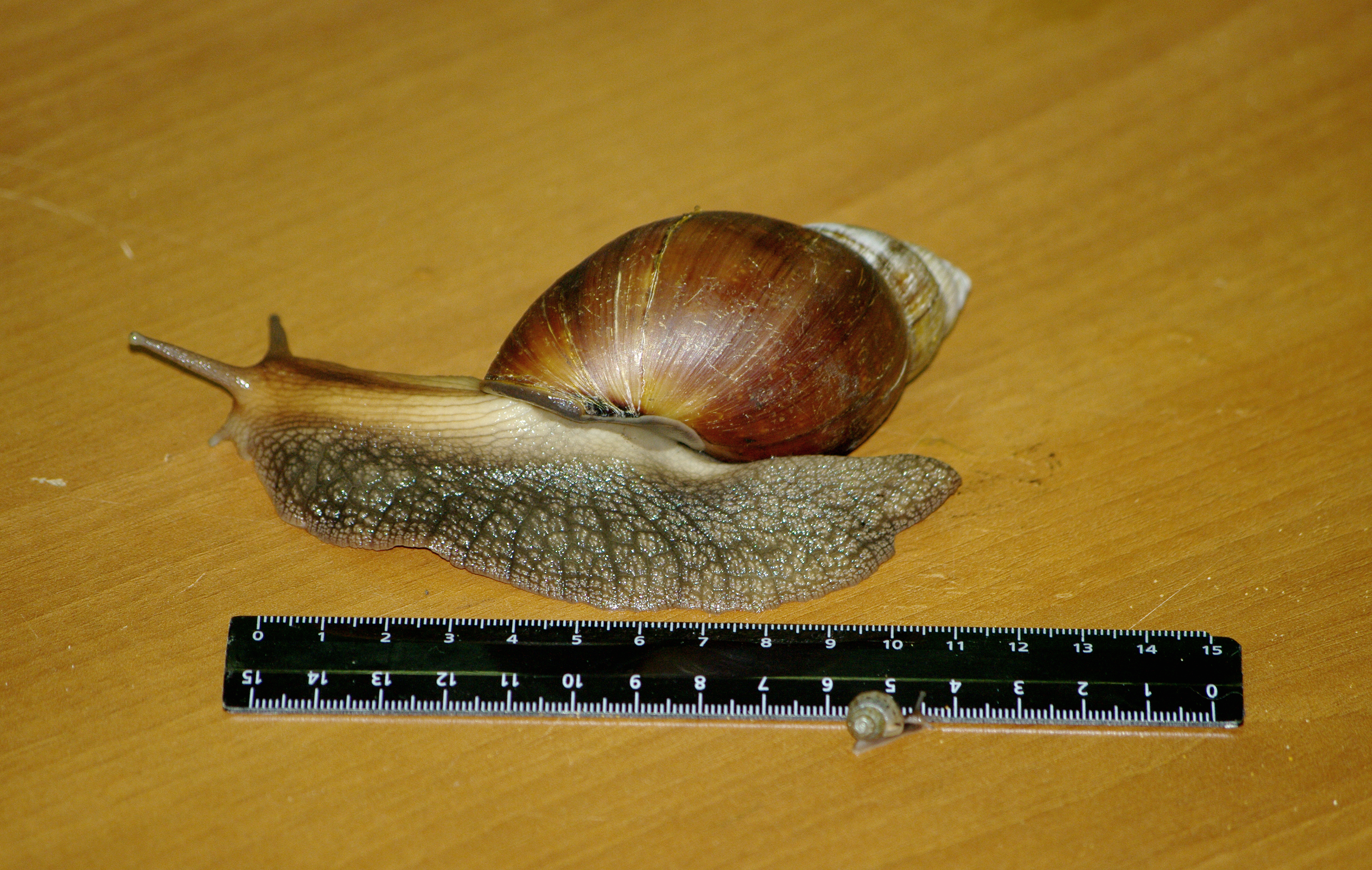
Adult and juvenile

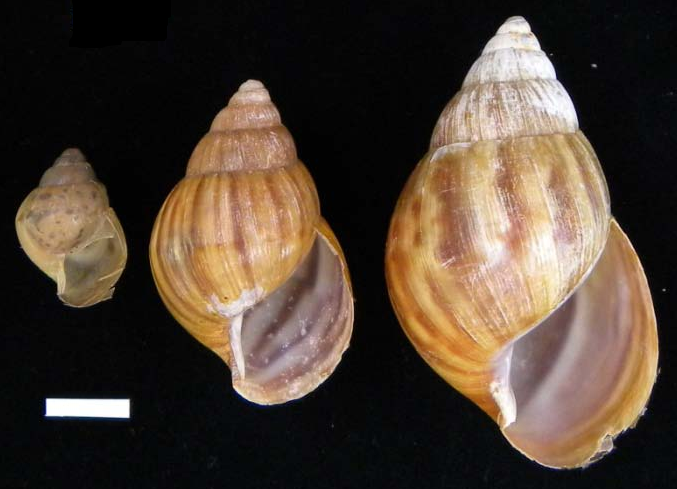
Three shells of increasing maturity

== Ecology ==
=== Habitat ===
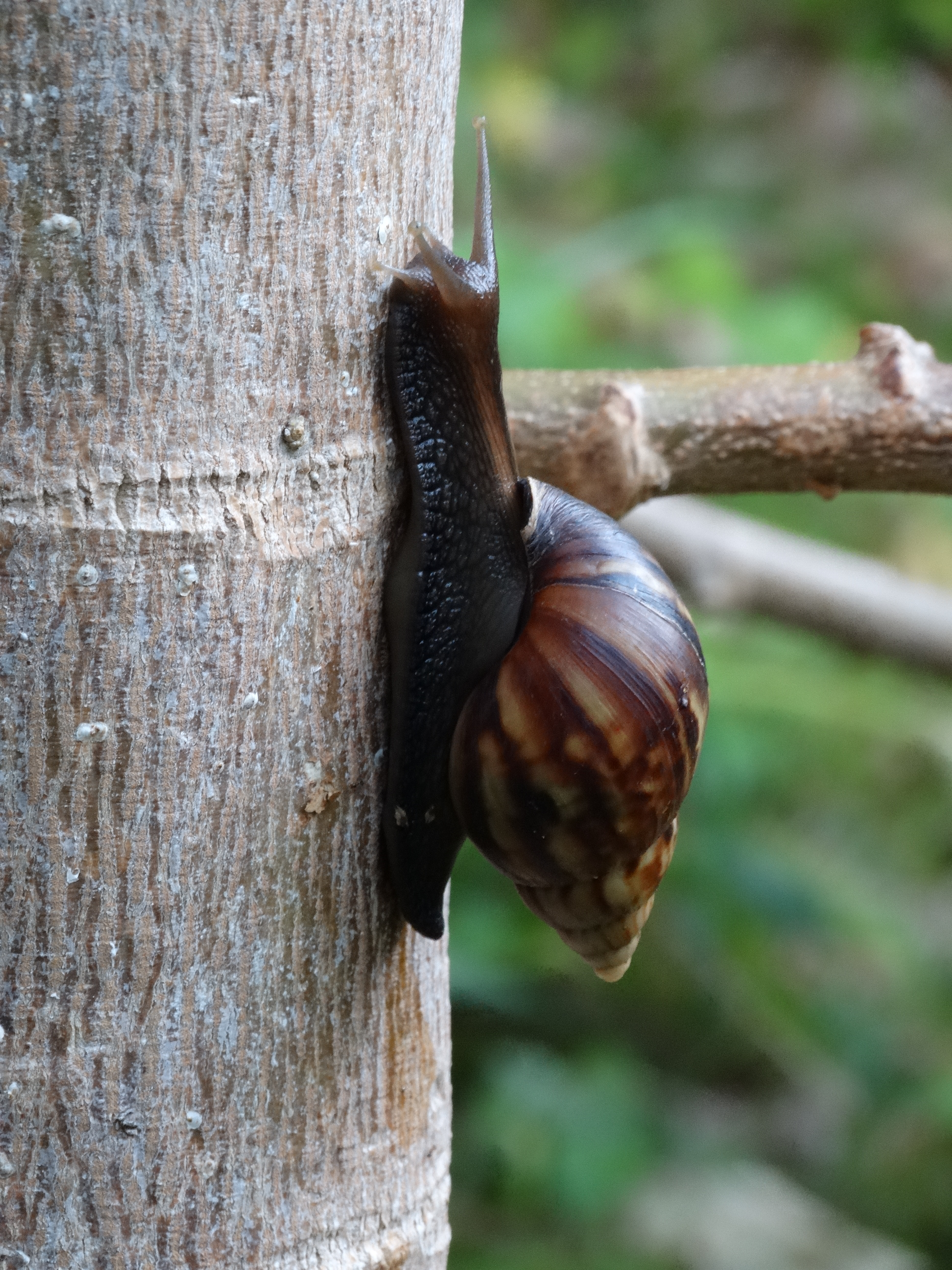
L. fulica climbing a papaya tree

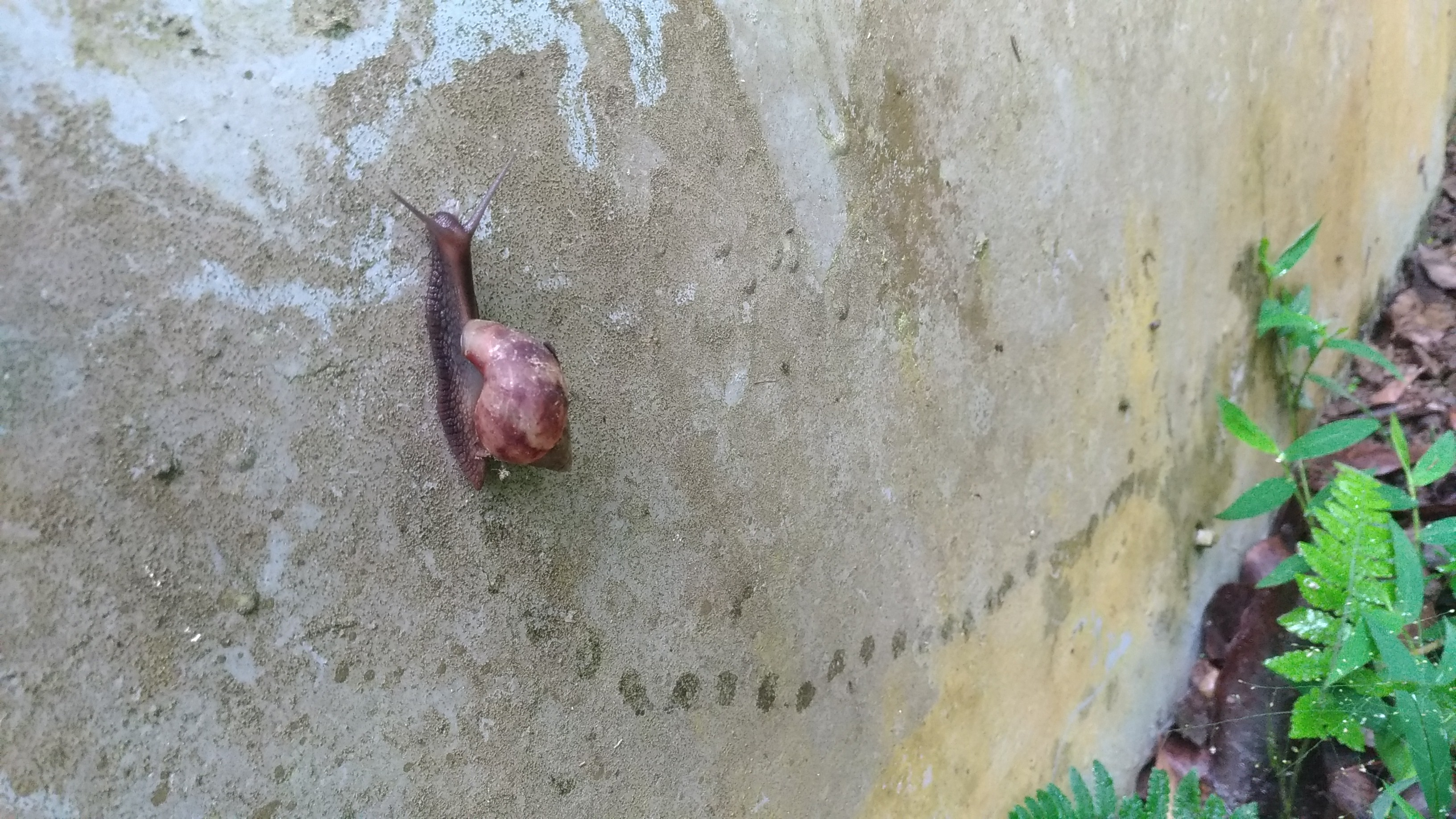
L. fulica climbing a wall

Within its native range in Africa, the snail is found along the margins of forests. Within its invasive range it can be found in agricultural areas as well as urban areas. The snails prefer areas that shelter them from light in the daytime and prevent desiccation; examples are leaf litter or piles of debris. It will also climb tree trunks or walls when conditions allow.

L. fulica occurs in a wide range of temperate climates, now including most regions of the humid tropics. The snail can tolerate a broad range of soil pH and calcium conditions, although calcium is critical for snail shell development. Relative humidity, such as the amount of rain, is an important factor for snail growth. In fact, the snail's shell growth pattern will reflect rain fall patterns, much like the growth rings of a tree. The species can tolerate temperatures of 0-9 °C (48.2 °F) to 45 °C (113 °F) but thrives in temperatures between 22 and 32 °C (71.6-89.6 °F). When overwintering is necessary, the snail will burrow below the surface and may not lay eggs until temperatures increase to above 15 °C (59 °F). Similarly, to avoid extreme heat and desiccation the snail can enter aestivation. The snail can survive in an aestivation state for several months by sealing itself into its shell by secretion of a calcareous compound (called an epiphragm) that dries on contact with the air.

=== Feeding ===
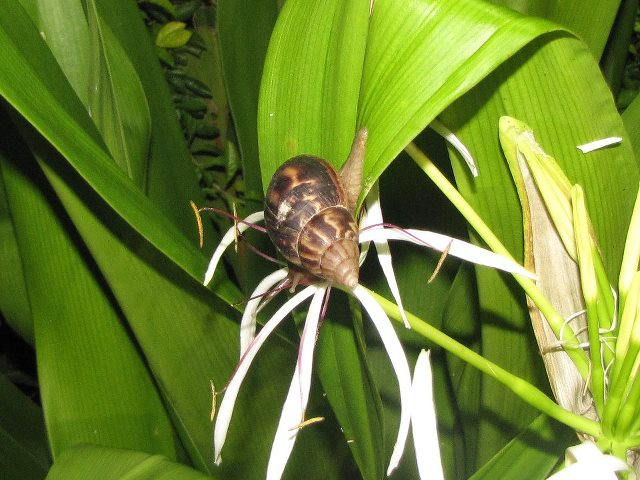
Feeding on Crinum leaves

The giant African snail is a macrophytophagous herbivore; it eats a wide range of living plant material, commercially important fruits and vegetables, ornamental plants such as flowers, native plants, as well as weeds and detritus plant material. At different life stages and temperatures, the snail has slightly different feeding preferences. For example, young snails are likely to consume soil for its calcium content.

Trash, cardboard, and occasionally stucco have been reportedly consumed. Under some conditions the snail will consume dead snails and other deceased animals. It can also be found consuming animal feces as a protein source, which is required for optimal growth.

=== Lifecycle ===
This snail is a protandric hermaphrodite; each individual has both testes and ovaries and is capable of producing both sperm and ova. The testes typically mature first around 5–8 months, followed by the ovaries. Self-fertilization has been observed and therefore snails do not require a partner to reproduce, however it is relatively rare and the resulting egg clutch is small with low viability. Typically, mating involves a simultaneous transfer of gametes to each other (bilateral sperm transfer, as compared to unilateral sperm transfer), however only the older snail with mature ovaries will produce eggs. Younger, smaller snails are more likely to initiate mating with a mate preference for larger, older snails; although larger, older snails may also mate with each other.

Snails mate at night and their mating begins with courtship rituals that can last up to half an hour, including petting their heads and front parts against each other. Up to 90% of attempted courtships are rejected and do not end in copulation. Copulation can last anywhere from 1–24 hours but tends to last 6–8 hours. Transferred sperm can be stored within the body up to two years.

The snails are oviparous and lay shelled eggs. The number of eggs per clutch and clutches per year varies by environment and age of the parent, but averages to around 200 eggs per clutch and 5–6 clutches per year. The eggs hatch after 8–21 days. The newly emerged neonate will consume its own shell and that of its siblings. The snail reaches adult size in about six months, after which growth slows, but does not cease until death. Life expectancy is 3–5 years in the wild and 5–6 years in captivity, but the snails can live for up to 10 years.

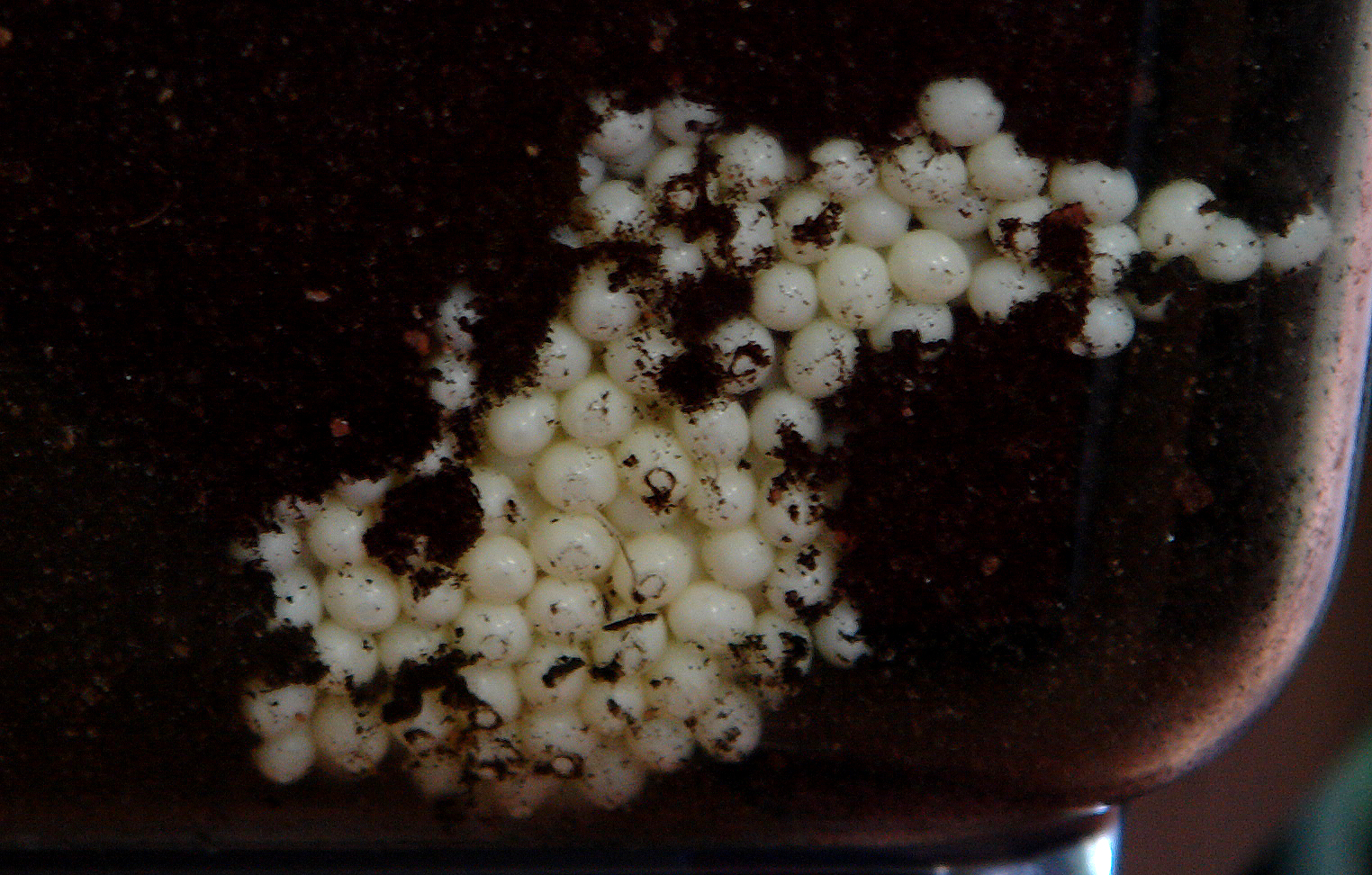
Fresh eggs

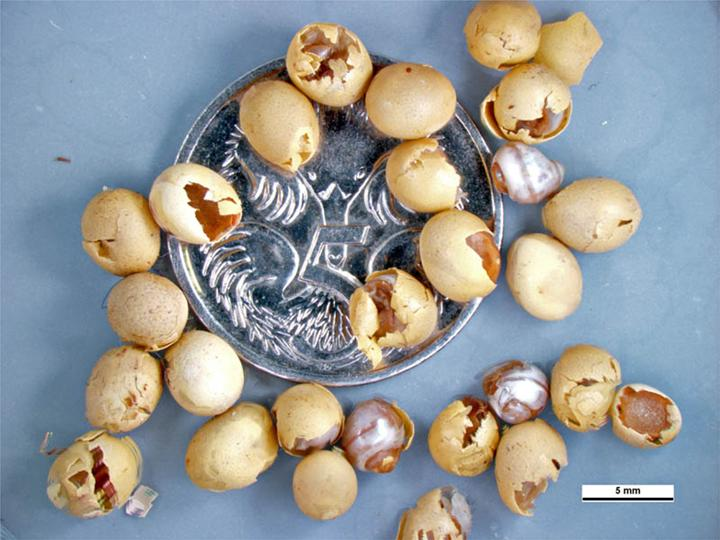
Hatching from eggs

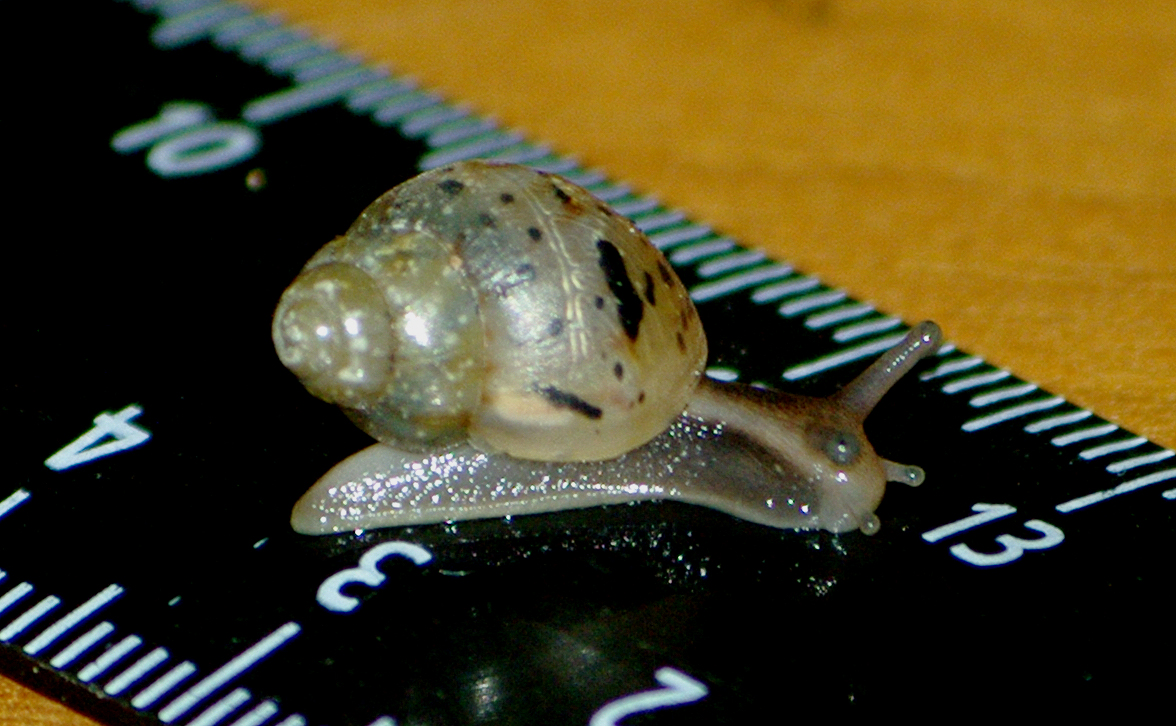
Neonate snail

== As an invasive species ==
In many places, this snail is a pest of agriculture and households, with the ability to transmit both human and plant pathogens. Suggested preventive measures include strict quarantine to prevent introduction and further spread. This snail has been given top national quarantine significance in the United States. In the past, quarantine officials have been able to successfully intercept and eradicate incipient invasions on the mainland U.S.

This snail was twice established in southeastern Florida and was successfully eradicated both times. They were brought to the U.S. through imports, intended for educational uses and to be pets. Some were also introduced because they were accidentally shipped with other cargo. An eradication effort in Florida began in 2011 when they were first sighted, and the last sighting was in 2017. In October 2021 the Florida Department of Agriculture declared the eradication a success after no further sightings in those four years. In June 2022 the snail was again found in Florida.

In the wild, this species often harbors the parasitic nematode Angiostrongylus cantonensis, which can cause a very serious meningitis in humans. Human cases of this meningitis usually result from a person having eaten the raw or undercooked snail, but even handling live wild snails of this species can infect a person with the nematode, thus causing a life-threatening infection.

In some regions, an effort has been made to promote use of the giant African snail as a food resource to reduce its populations. However, promoting a pest in this way is a controversial measure, because it may encourage the further deliberate spread of the snails.

One particularly catastrophic attempt to biologically control this species occurred on South Pacific Islands. Colonies of A. fulica were introduced as a food reserve for the American military during World War II and they escaped. A carnivorous species (Florida rosy wolfsnail, Euglandina rosea) was later introduced by the United States government, in an attempt to control A. fulica, but the rosy wolf snail instead heavily preyed upon the native Partula snails, causing the extinction of most Partula species within a decade.

The snail has been eradicated from California (U.S.), Queensland (Australia), Fiji, Western Samoa, Vanuatu, and Wake Island, but these were relatively small populations.

The Argentinian National Agricultural Health Service has established an ongoing project to detect, study, and prevent the expansion of this pest.

In early April 2021, USCBP intercepted 22 being smuggled from Ghana into the U.S., along with various other prohibited quarantine items.

== Human health ==
Terrestrial snails in urban environments at high densities pose a risk for human health in the form of zoonotic disease. Human-mediated transport is a major cause of the dispersal of invasive and pest snails, which are then able to survive at high densities in close proximity to people. Young children and adults are vulnerable to zoonotic disease due to an increased likelihood of direct contact with the snail (such as picking the snail up) as well as ingestion of the snail or vegetation contaminated by the snail. Direct contact with snail or ingestion of snail-contaminated food and subsequent infection can result in gastrointestinal and urinary symptoms followed by neurological symptoms. These symptoms appear if the infected snail itself is ingested but is also likely to result in muscular and sensory symptoms.

=== Rat lung worm disease ===
Angiostrongylus cantonensis, also known as "rat lungworm", is a nematode that causes eosinophilic meningoencephalitis. Infected snails have been found in South American countries including Peru, Ecuador, Venezuela, and Brazil. As of 2020, no human-cases were reported in Florida, U.S., but have been documented in the states of Louisiana, Texas, with the greatest number in Hawaii.

In Hawaii, 82 cases were reported between 2007 and 2017. Commonly reported symptoms were headache, body aches, painful or sensitive skin, and a stiff neck; however, fever, vomiting, irritability, fatigue, and loss of appetite were reported in children 10 or younger.

Human cases of this meningitis usually result from a person having eaten the raw or undercooked snail, but even handling live wild snails of this species can infect a person with the nematode, thus causing a life-threatening infection. The most noticeable incident of human cases in Taiwan was the Chung family of Kimlan Foods: The family, which believed that eating raw snails could strengthen the body, contracted the lungworm and led to five fatalities after eating raw snails. The only surviving member of the family was not in Taiwan. After the incident, eating raw snails no longer exists in Taiwan.

=== Other parasites ===
Several different species and types of parasites have been known to infect Lissachatina fulica, including more than 12 nematodes.

- Aelurostrongylus abstrusus, also known as "feline lungworm", is a nematode that infects cats.
- Angiostrongylus costaricensis is a nematode that causes abdominal angiostrongyliasis.
- Fasciola gigantica is a flatworm that has been detected in the faeces and intestines of the snail.
- Hymenolepis is a tapeworm that has been detected in the faeces of the snail.
- Schistosoma mansoni is a parasitic flatworm that causes intestinal schistosomiasis. Sporocysts of S. mansoni have been detected in snail faeces
- Strongyloides species, including Strongyloides stercoralis, are roundworms that have been detected in faeces and in mucous secretion of the snail.
- Trichuris is a roundworm that has been detected in the faeces of the snail.

== In culture ==
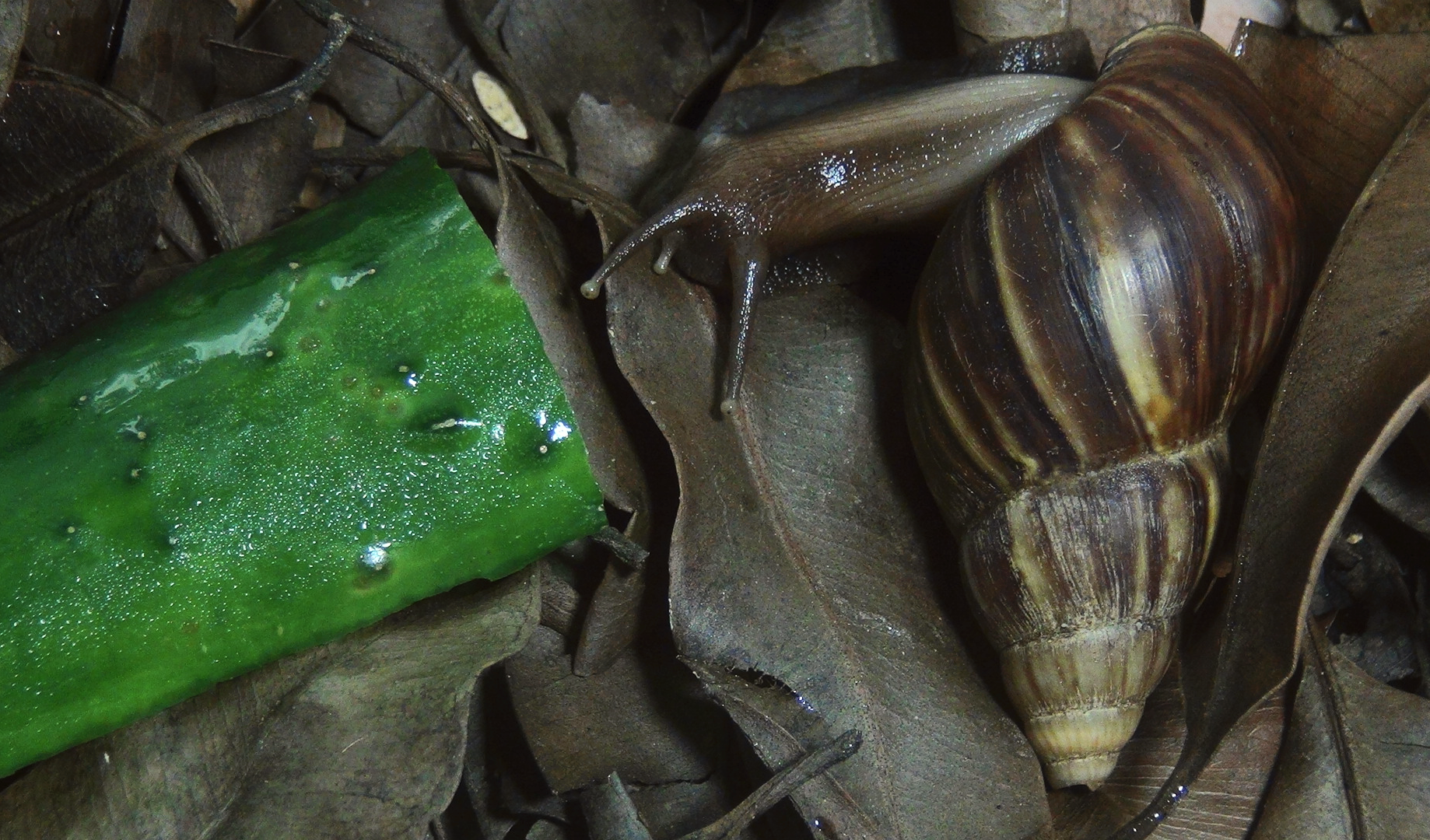
Individual being kept as a pet

These snails are used by some practitioners of Candomblé for religious purposes in Brazil as an offering to the deity Oxalá. The snails substitute for a closely related species, the West African giant snail (Archachatina marginata), normally offered in Nigeria. The two species are similar enough in appearance to satisfy religious authorities. They are also edible if cooked properly.

In Taiwan, this species is used in a dish called "fried snail" (炒螺肉), which is a delicacy among many traditional drinking snacks. L. fulica also constitutes the predominant land snail found in Chinese markets, and larger species have potential as small, efficient livestock.

The snails have also become increasingly popular as pets in some countries, where various companies have sold the animal both as a pet and an education aid. In light of social media posts where pet owners share images in close contact with the snails, a research from the University of Lausanne alerted with the risks of infections transmitted to humans.

The heparinoid acharan sulfate has been isolated from this species.
