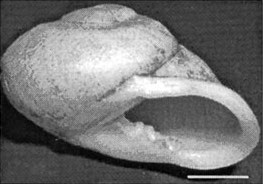
- Black-and-white photo of an apertural view of a shell of Thelidomus aspera from Jamaica. Scale bar = 1 cm.

Scientific classification
- Kingdom: Animalia
- Phylum: Mollusca
- Class: Gastropoda
- Order: Stylommatophora
- Family: Pleurodontidae
- Genus: Thelidomus
- Species: T. aspera

Binomial name
- Thelidomus aspera (Férussac, 1821)

Synonyms
- Helix granosa

= Thelidomus aspera =

Species of gastropod

Thelidomus aspera is a species of air-breathing land snail, a terrestrial pulmonate gastropod mollusc in the family Pleurodontidae. It is endemic to Jamaica.

== Invasive species ==
This species has not yet become established in the US, but it is considered to represent a potentially serious threat as a pest, an invasive species which could negatively affect agriculture, natural ecosystems, human health or commerce. Therefore, it has been suggested that this species be given top national quarantine significance in the USA.

== Ecology ==
=== Parasites ===
Thelidomus aspera is a host for larvae of the parasites Angiostrongylus cantonensis and Aelurostrongylus abstrusus.
