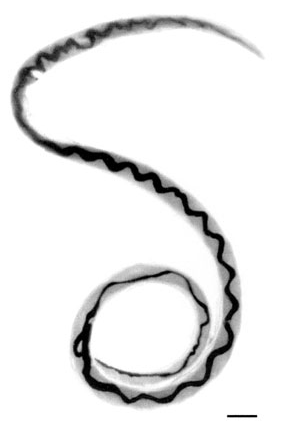
- Adult female worm of Angiostrongylus cantonensis. Scale bar is 1 mm.

Scientific classification
- Kingdom: Animalia
- Phylum: Nematoda
- Class: Chromadorea
- Order: Rhabditida
- Family: Angiostrongylidae
- Genus: Angiostrongylus; Kamensky, 1905

Species
- Angiostrongylus cantonensis (Chen, 1935); Angiostrongylus chabaudi; Angiostrongylus costaricensis Morera & Cespedes, 1971; Angiostrongylus daskalovi; Angiostrongylus dujardini; Angiostrongylus mackerrasae; Angiostrongylus malaysiensis; Angiostrongylus vasorum Baillet, 1866

= Angiostrongylus =

Genus of roundworms

Angiostrongylus is a genus of parasitic nematodes in the family Metastrongylidae.

== Species ==
Species in the genus

- Angiostrongylus cantonensis (Chen, 1935)
- Angiostrongylus costaricensis Morera & Cespedes, 1971
- Angiostrongylus vasorum Baillet, 1866
