= Aelurostrongylus abstrusus =

Scientific classification
- Kingdom: Animalia
- Phylum: Nematoda
- Class: Chromadorea
- Order: Rhabditida
- Family: Angiostrongylidae
- Genus: Aelurostrongylus
- Species: A. abstrusus

Binomial name
- Aelurostrongylus abstrusus (Railliet, 1898)

Species of roundworm

Aelurostrongylus abstrusus is a species of nematode from the family Angiostrongylidae.

== Hosts ==
Intermediate hosts include:

- land snail Achatina fulica
- land snail Thelidomus aspera
- garden snail Cornu aspersum

Final hosts include:

- cats (family Felidae)

== Bibliography ==
- Studzińska, M. B., Demkowska-Kutrzepa, M., Komsta, R., Tomczuk, K., Kruczek, A., Junkuszew, A., & Dudko, P. (2017). Aelurostrongylus abstrusus - The Cause of Respiratory Disease. Medycyna Weterynaryjna, 73(11), 739–742. https://doi.org/10.21521/mw.5793.
- Morelli, S., Colombo, M., Diakou, A., Traversa, D., Grillini, M., Frangipane di Regalbono, A., & Di Cesare, A. (2021). The Influence of Temperature on the Larval Development of Aelurostrongylus abstrusus in the Land Snail Cornu aspersum. Pathogens, 10(8), 960. https://doi.org/10.3390/pathogens10080960.
