= Angiostrongyliasis =

Parasitic infectious disease

- Specialty: Infectious diseases

Angiostrongyliasis is an infection by a roundworm of the Angiostrongylus type. Symptoms may vary from none to mild, to meningitis.

Infection with Angiostrongylus cantonensis (rat lungworm) can occur after ingestion of raw or undercooked snails or slugs, and less likely unwashed fruits and vegetables.

In humans, A. cantonensis is the most common cause of eosinophilic meningitis or meningoencephalitis. Frequently the infection will resolve without treatment or serious consequences, but in cases with a heavy load of parasites the infection can be so severe it can cause permanent damage to the central nervous system (CNS) or death.

== Signs and symptoms ==
Infection first presents with severe abdominal pain, nausea, vomiting, and weakness, which gradually lessens and progresses to fever, and then to central nervous system (CNS) symptoms and severe headache and stiffness of the neck.

=== Central Nervous System infection ===
Central Nervous System (CNS) signs and symptoms begin with mild cognitive impairment and slowed reactions, and in a very severe form often progress to unconsciousness. Patients may present with neuropathic pain early in the infection. Eventually, severe infection will lead to ascending weakness, quadriparesis, areflexia, respiratory failure, and muscle atrophy, and will lead to death if not treated. Occasionally patients present with cranial nerve palsies, usually in nerves 7 and 8, and rarely larvae will enter ocular structures. Even with treatment, damage to the CNS may be permanent and result in a variety of negative outcomes depending on the location of the infection, and the patient may experience chronic pain as a result of infection.

=== Eye invasion ===
Signs and symptoms of eye invasion include visual impairment, eye pain, keratitis, and swelling of the retina. Worms usually appear in the anterior chamber and vitreous humor and can sometimes be removed surgically.

=== Incubation period ===
The incubation period in humans is usually from 1 week to 1 month after infection and can be as long as 47 days. This interval varies, since humans are accidental hosts, and the life cycle does not continue predictably as it would in a rat.

== Cause ==
=== Transmission ===
Transmission is usually from eating raw or undercooked snails or other vectors. Infection is also frequent from ingestion of contaminated water or unwashed salad that may contain small snails and slugs, or have been contaminated by them. Certain animal species such as freshwater prawns, crayfish, crabs, centipedes, lizards and frogs and toads may act as paratenic hosts for the nematode larvae and cause accidental transmission when consumed raw or undercooked.

=== Reservoirs ===
Rats are the definitive host and the main reservoir for A. cantonensis, though other small mammals may also become infected. While Angiostrongylus can infect humans, humans do not act as reservoirs since the worm cannot reproduce in humans and therefore humans cannot contribute to their life cycle.

=== Vectors ===
Angiostrongylus cantonensis has many vectors among invertebrates, with the most common being several species of snails, including the giant African land snail (Achatina) in the Pacific islands and apple snails of the genus Pila in Thailand and Malaysia. The golden apple snail, Pomacea canaliculata, is the most important vector in areas of China. Freshwater prawns, crabs, or other paratenic, or transport, hosts can also act as vectors.

=== Organism ===
==== Morphology ====
A. cantonensis is a nematode roundworm with 3 outer protective collagen layers and a simple stomal opening or mouth with no lips or buccal cavity leading to a fully developed gastrointestinal tract. Males have a small copulatory bursa at the posterior. Females have a "barber pole" shape down the middle of the body, which is created by the twisting together of the intestine and uterine tubules. The worms are long and slender - males are 15.9–19 mm in length, and females are 21–25 mm in length.

==== Life cycle ====
The adult form of A. cantonensis resides in the pulmonary arteries of rodents, where it reproduces. After the eggs hatch in the arteries, larvae migrate up the pharynx and are swallowed again by the rodent and passed in the stool. These first-stage larvae penetrate or are swallowed by snail intermediate hosts, where they transform into second-stage larvae and then into third-stage infective larvae. Humans and rats acquire the infection when they ingest contaminated snails or paratenic (transport) hosts including prawns, crabs, and frogs, or raw vegetables containing material from these intermediate and paratenic hosts. After passing through the gastrointestinal tract, the worms enter circulation. In rats, the larvae then migrate to the meninges and develop for about a month before migrating to the pulmonary arteries, where they fully develop into adults.

Humans are incidental hosts; the larvae cannot reproduce in humans and humans do not contribute to the A. cantonensis life cycle. In humans, the circulating larvae migrate to the meninges but do not move on to the lungs. Sometimes the larvae will develop into the adult form in the brain and cerebrospinal fluid (CSF), but they quickly die, inciting the inflammatory reaction that causes symptoms of infection.

== Diagnosis ==
Diagnosis of Angiostrongyliasis is complicated due to the difficulty of presenting the angiostrongylus larvae themselves, and will usually be made based on the presence of eosinophilic meningitis and history of exposure to snail hosts. Eosinophilic meningitis is generally characterized as meningitis with >10 eosinophils/μL in the CSF or at least 10% eosinophils in the total CSF leukocyte count. Occasionally worms found in the cerebrospinal fluid or surgically removed from the eye can be identified to diagnose Angiostrongyliasis.

=== Lumbar puncture ===
Lumbar puncture should always be done in cases of suspected meningitis. In cases of eosinophilic meningitis, it will rarely produce worms even when they are present in the CSF, because they tend to cling to the end of nerves. CSF contains larvae only in 1.9-10% of cases. However, as a case of eosinophilic meningitis progresses, intracranial pressure and eosinophil counts should rise. Increased levels of eosinophils in the CSF are a hallmark of eosinophilic meningitis.

=== Brain imaging ===
Brain lesions, with invasion of both gray and white matter, can be seen on a CT or MRI. However, MRI findings may include nonspecific lesions and ventricular enlargement. Sometimes a brain bleed (hemorrhage), probably produced by migrating worms, is present and of diagnostic value.

=== Serology ===
In patients with elevated eosinophils, serology can be used to confirm a diagnosis of angiostrongyliasis rather than infection with another parasite. Several immunoassays that can aid in the diagnosis, however, serologic testing is available in few labs in the endemic area, and is frequently too non-specific. Some cross-reactivity has been reported between A. cantonensis and trichinosis, making diagnosis less specific.

The most definitive diagnosis always arises from identifying larvae found in the CSF or eye, however, due to this rarity a clinical diagnosis based on the above tests is most likely.

== Prevention ==
There are public health strategies that can limit the transmission of A. cantonensis by limiting contact with infected vectors. Vector control may be possible, but has not been very successful in the past. Education to prevent the introduction of rats or snail vectors outside endemic areas is important to limit the spread of the disease. There are no vaccines in development for angiostrongyliasis.

=== Recommendations for individuals ===
To avoid infection when in endemic areas, travelers should:

- Avoid consumption of uncooked vectors, such as snails and freshwater prawns
- Avoid drinking water from open sources, which may have been contaminated by vectors
- Prevent young children from playing with or eating live snails

== Treatment ==
Treatment of angiostrongyliasis is not well defined, but most strategies include a combination of anti-parasitics to kill the worms, steroids to limit inflammation as the worms die, and pain medication to manage the symptoms of meningitis.

=== Anthelmintics ===
Anthelmintics are often used to kill off the worms, however, in some cases, this may cause patients to worsen due to toxins released by the dying worms. Albendazole, ivermectin, mebendazole, and pyrantel are all commonly used, though albendazole is usually the drug of choice. Studies have shown that anthelmintics may shorten the course of the disease and relieve symptoms. Therefore, anthelmintics are generally recommended but should be administered gradually to limit the inflammatory reaction.

=== Anti-inflammatories ===
Anthelmintics should generally be paired with corticosteroids in severe infections to limit the inflammatory reaction to the dying parasites. Studies suggest that a two-week regimen of a combination of mebendazole and prednisolone significantly shortened the course of the disease and length of associated headaches without observed harmful side effects. Other studies suggest that albendazole may be more favorable, because it may be less like to incite an inflammatory reaction.

=== Symptomatic treatment ===
Symptomatic treatment is indicated for symptoms such as nausea, vomiting, headache, and in some cases, chronic pain due to nerve damage or muscle atrophy.

== Epidemiology ==
A. cantonensis and its vectors are endemic to Southeast Asia and the Pacific Basin. The infection is becoming increasingly important as globalization allows it to spread to more locations, and as more travelers encounter the parasites. The parasites probably travel effectively through rats traveling as stowaways on ships and through the introduction of snail vectors outside endemic areas.

Although mostly found in Asia and the Pacific where asymptomatic infection can be as high as 88%, human cases have been reported in the Caribbean, where as much as 25% of the population may be infected. In the United States, cases have been reported in Hawaii, which is in the endemic area. The infection is now endemic in wildlife and a few human cases have also been reported in areas where the parasite was not originally endemic, such as New Orleans and Egypt. In December 2024, a wallaby born and raised at the San Diego Zoo (San Diego, CA) was found found to have meningitis caused by A. cantonensis. Roof rats in the zoo and opossums in San Diego County were confirmed to have been infected as well.

The disease has also arrived in Brazil, where there were 34 confirmed cases from 2006 to 2014, including one death. The giant African land snail, which can be a vector of the parasite, has been introduced to Brazil as an invasive species and is spreading the disease. There may be more undiagnosed cases, as Brazilian physicians are unfamiliar with eosinophilic meningitis associated with angiostrongyliasis and misdiagnose it as bacterial or viral.

The parasite is rarely seen outside of endemic areas, and in these cases, patients generally have a history of travel to an endemic area.

== See also ==
- Schistosomiasis, a parasitic disease also spread by snails
- List of unusual deaths – lists Australian man Sam Ballard as dying from Angiostrongyliasis in 2018, as a result of eating a garden slug eight years earlier on a dare
