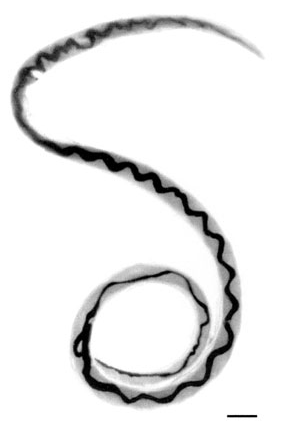
- Angiostrongylus cantonensis

Scientific classification
- Kingdom: Animalia
- Phylum: Nematoda
- Class: Chromadorea
- Order: Rhabditida
- Family: Angiostrongylidae
- Genus: Aelurostrongylus; Cameron, 1927

= Aelurostrongylus =

Genus of worms

Aelurostrongylus is a genus of nematodes belonging to the family Angiostrongylidae.

The species of this genus are found in Europe and Northern America.

Species:

- Aelurostrongylus abstrusus (Railliet, 1898)
- Aelurostrongylus falciformis (Schlegel, 1933)
- Aelurostrongylus pridhami (Anderson, 1962)
