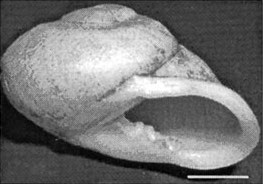
- Black-and-white photo showing an apertural view of a shell of Thelidomus aspera from Jamaica. Scale bar = 1 cm.

Scientific classification
- Kingdom: Animalia
- Phylum: Mollusca
- Class: Gastropoda
- Order: Stylommatophora
- Infraorder: Helicoidei
- Superfamily: Helicoidea
- Family: Pleurodontidae
- Genus: Thelidomus; Swainson, 1840

Synonyms
- Dendrocochlis Pilsbry & A.P. Brown, 1910; Helix (Pachystoma) Albers, 1850 (Invalid: junior homonym of Pachystoma Guilding, 1828 [Ampullariidae].); Pachystoma Albers, 1850

= Thelidomus =

Genus of gastropods

Thelidomus is a genus of air-breathing land snails, terrestrial pulmonate gastropod molluscs in the family Pleurodontidae.

This genus is endemic to Jamaica.

== Species ==
Species within the genus Thelidomus include:

- Thelidomus aspera (Férussac, 1821)
- Thelidomus cognatus (Férussac, 1821)
