= Albert R. Mead =

American malacologist

Albert Raymond Mead (July 17, 1915–March 13, 2009) was a malacologist who studied the invasive giant African land snail. He was born in San Jose, California. He served as a 2nd Lieutenant for American forces during World War II, acting as a parasitologist for the Inter-Allied Malaria Control Unit from 1943-1945.

While stationed in Ghana he became interested in the genus Achatina, some of the world's largest terrestrial snails. He was transferred to the South Pacific theater, where in Hawaii he was able to begin research on the invasive snail species. By the 1950s, he had established himself as a snail specialist and wrote profusely on the subject. Notably, he published the books The Giant African Snail: A Problem in Economic Malacology (1961) and Economic Malacology with Particular Reference to Achatina fulica (1979).

Albert Mead received his bachelors in entomology at the University of California, Berkeley, 1938. He attended Cornell University from 1938-1940. He later returned to earn his Ph.D. at Cornell University in 1942. He taught as a professor of zoology at the University of Arizona, Tuscan, beginning in 1946 until retirement where he also served as the head of the department of zoology. He contributed as a taxonomist, studying snail genitalia and introducing 11 new taxa to Mollusca.
