= Angiostrongylus costaricensis =

Scientific classification
- Kingdom: Animalia
- Phylum: Nematoda
- Class: Chromadorea
- Order: Rhabditida
- Family: Angiostrongylidae
- Genus: Angiostrongylus
- Species: A. costaricensis

Binomial name
- Angiostrongylus costaricensis Morera & Céspedes, 1971

Species of roundworm

Angiostrongylus costaricensis is a species of parasitic nematode and is the causative agent of abdominal angiostrongyliasis in humans. It occurs in Latin America and the Caribbean.

== Hosts ==
Rodents are the normal definitive hosts, especially the cotton rat. Aberrant infections have occurred in many other mammals including humans. Infection of mammalian hosts occurs via ingestion of L3 larvae in mollusc tissue (e.g. undercooked or raw snails or accidentally on produce) or possibly food contaminated with slime containing such larvae.

Molluscs are the intermediate host and are infected through ingestion or penetration of the foot by L1 infective larvae from infected feces.

- Limax maximus
- Slugs from the family Veronicellidae

== Pathology ==
Pathology is due to both the adults and the eggs. Adults in the ileo-caecal arterioles cause an inflammatory (eosinophilic) response in humans. In the Cotton Rat the adult worms cause local haemorrhages.

The intestinal wall is also affected. In humans there is a thickening of the intestinal wall (ileum, appendix and caecum). In rats with heavy infestations there is a yellow discolouring of the surface of the intestinal walls.

== Clinical signs and diagnosis ==
- Abdominal pain which presents as a palpable mass on clinical examination
- Anorexia
- Diarrhoea
- Vomiting

In the blood and tissue biopsy there is eosinophilia. Other methods of diagnosis from a biopsy are eggs and larvae in the blood vessels. Imaging of the liver and intestine can also be helpful. Serology is sometimes used to diagnose from a blood sample and there are specific enzyme-linked immunosorbent assays (ELISA).

This is a rare disease. In Martinique, a French island of the Antilles, two confirmed cases and two probable cases were identified during an 18-year period (2000-2017), with an estimated incidence of 0.2 cases per year (0.003 case/year/100.000 inhabitants).

== Diagnosis ==
Diagnosis is based primarily on detection of worms and/or eggs in biopsy specimens.
