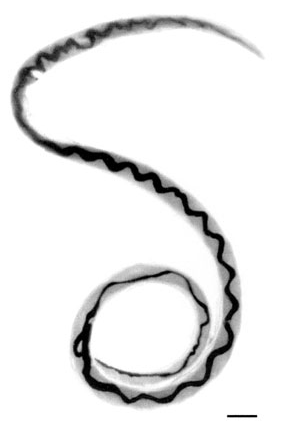
- Angiostrongylus cantonensis

Scientific classification
- Domain: Eukaryota
- Kingdom: Animalia
- Phylum: Nematoda
- Class: Chromadorea
- Order: Rhabditida
- Superfamily: Metastrongyloidea
- Family: Angiostrongylidae

= Angiostrongylidae =

Family of roundworms

Angiostrongylidae is a family of nematodes belonging to the order Rhabditida.

Genera:

- Aelurostrongylus Cameron, 1927
- Chabaudistrongylus Kontramavichus, 1979
- Gallegostrongylus Mas-Coma, 1978
- Rodentocaulus Schulz, Orlov & Kutass, 1933
- Sobolevingylus Romanov, 1952
- Stefanskostrongylus Drozdz, 1970
