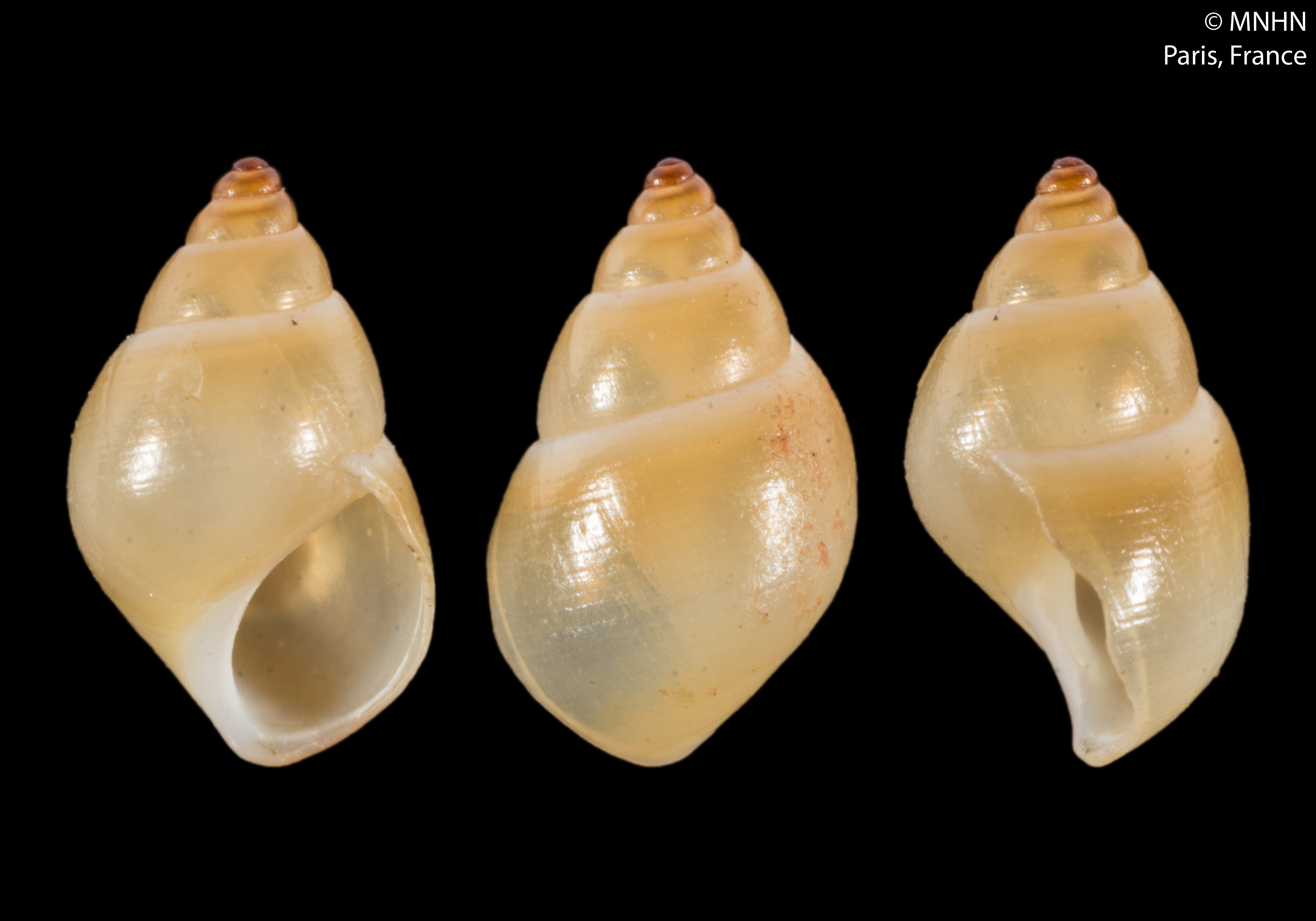
- Shell of Stanleya neritinoides (syntype at MNHN, Paris)

Conservation status
- Data Deficient (IUCN 3.1)

Scientific classification
- Kingdom: Animalia
- Phylum: Mollusca
- Class: Gastropoda
- Subclass: Caenogastropoda
- Family: Paludomidae
- Genus: Stanleya; Bourguignat, 1885
- Species: S. neritinoides

Binomial name
- Stanleya neritinoides (E. A. Smith, 1880)

Synonyms
- Lithoglyphus neritinoides Smith, 1880; Rumella giraudi Bourguignat, 1885(junior synonym); Rumella milneedwardsiana Bourguignat, 1885 (junior synonym); Stanleya giraudi Bourguignat, 1885 (junior synonym); Stanleya smithiana Bourguignat, 1885 (junior synonym)

= Stanleya neritinoides =

Species of gastropod

Stanleya neritinoides is a species of freshwater snail, an aquatic gastropod mollusc in the family Paludomidae.

Stanleya neritinoides is probably the only species in the genus Stanleya. The genus Stanleya may be closely related to the genus Tanganyicia.

This species was listed as Endangered in the 2006 IUCN Red List.

== Distribution ==
This species is found in Burundi, the Democratic Republic of the Congo, Tanzania, and Zambia.

The type locality is Lake Tanganyika.

== Description ==
The width of the shell is 8.0 millimetres (0.31 in). The height of the shell is 9.8 millimetres (0.39 in).
