= Syrnolopsis minuta =

Conservation status
- Least Concern (IUCN 3.1)

Scientific classification
- Kingdom: Animalia
- Phylum: Mollusca
- Class: Gastropoda
- Subclass: Caenogastropoda
- Order: incertae sedis
- Family: Paludomidae
- Genus: Syrnolopsis
- Species: S. minuta

Binomial name
- Syrnolopsis minuta Bourguignat, 1885

Species of gastropod

Syrnolopsis minuta is a species of medium-sized freshwater snail with an operculum, an aquatic gastropod mollusks in the family Paludomidae. This species is found around the edges of Lake Tanganyika, which includes the countries of Burundi, the Democratic Republic of the Congo, Tanzania, and Zambia. The natural habitat of this species is intermittent freshwater lakes.
