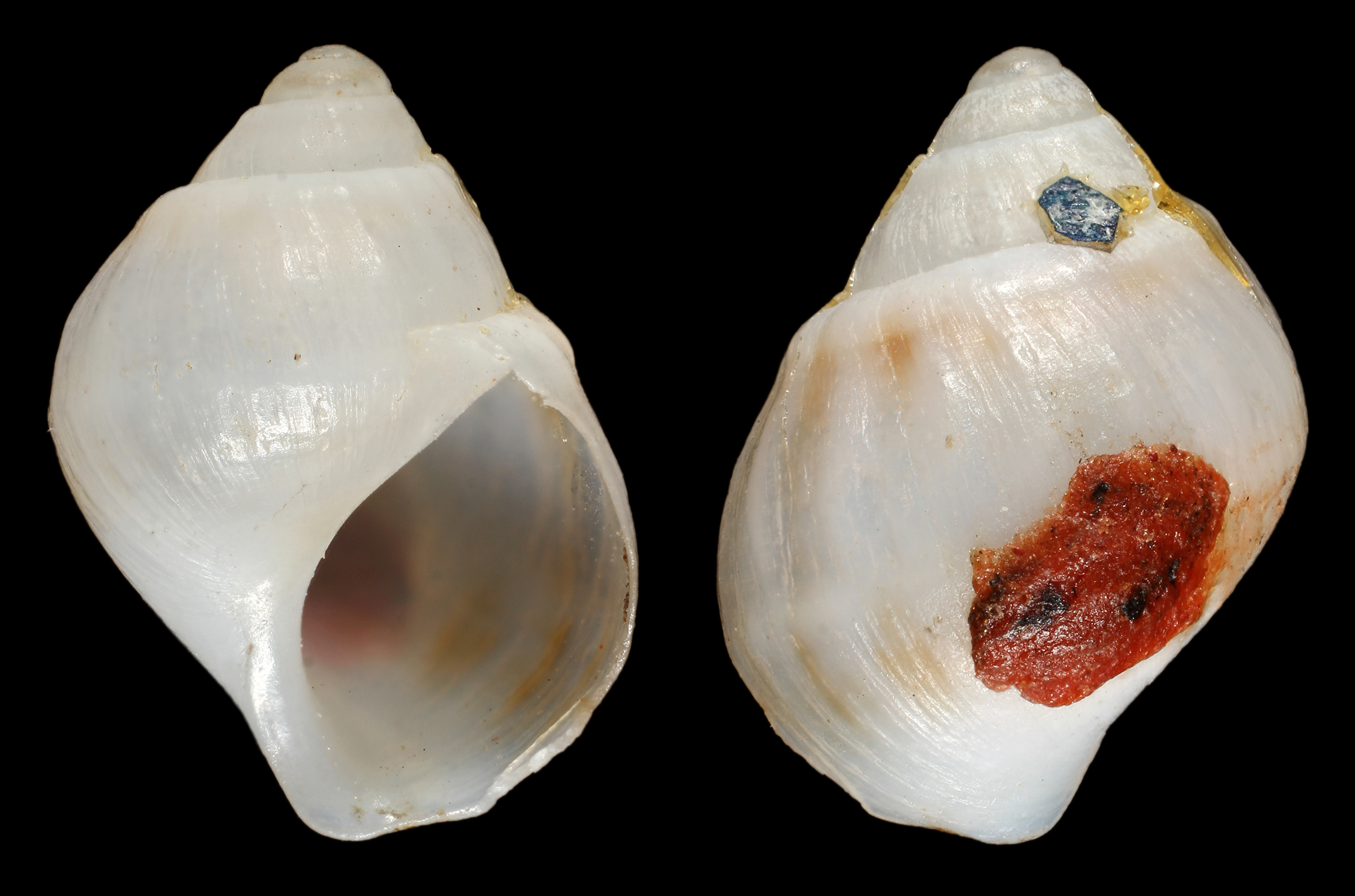
- Shell of Bridouxia giraudi (syntype at MNHN, Paris)

Conservation status
- Least Concern (IUCN 3.1)

Scientific classification
- Kingdom: Animalia
- Phylum: Mollusca
- Class: Gastropoda
- Subclass: Caenogastropoda
- Family: Paludomidae
- Genus: Bridouxia
- Species: B. giraudi

Binomial name
- Bridouxia giraudi Bourguignat, 1885

Synonyms
- Baizea giraudi Bourguignat, 1885; Bridouxiana giraudi Bourguignat [orth. error]; Bridouxia costata Bourguignat, 1885; Bridouxia reymondi Bourguignat, 1885; Bridouxia villeserriana Bourguignat, 1885; Giraudia grandidieriana Bourguignat, 1885; Giraudia praeclara Bourguignat, 1885

= Bridouxia giraudi =

Species of gastropod

Bridouxia giraudi is a species of tropical freshwater snail with a gill and an operculum, an aquatic gastropod mollusk in the family Paludomidae.

Bridouxia giraudi is the type species of the genus Bridouxia.

This species is found in Burundi, the Democratic Republic of the Congo, Tanzania, and Zambia. Its natural habitat is freshwater lakes.
