= Cleopatra guillemei =

Conservation status
- Data Deficient (IUCN 3.1)

Scientific classification
- Kingdom: Animalia
- Phylum: Mollusca
- Class: Gastropoda
- Subclass: Caenogastropoda
- Order: incertae sedis
- Family: Paludomidae
- Genus: Cleopatra
- Species: C. guillemei

Binomial name
- Cleopatra guillemei Bourguignat, 1885

Species of gastropod

Cleopatra guillemei is a species of freshwater snails with an operculum, aquatic gastropod molluscs in the family Paludomidae.

This species is found in Burundi, Kenya, Tanzania, and possibly Uganda. Its natural habitats are rivers and swamps.
