= Lavigeria paucicostata =

Conservation status
- Least Concern (IUCN 3.1)

Scientific classification
- Kingdom: Animalia
- Phylum: Mollusca
- Class: Gastropoda
- Subclass: Caenogastropoda
- Order: incertae sedis
- Family: Paludomidae
- Genus: Lavigeria
- Species: L. paucicostata

Binomial name
- Lavigeria paucicostata (Bourguignat, 1888)

Species of gastropod

Lavigeria paucicostata is a species of tropical freshwater snail with a gill and an operculum, aquatic gastropod mollusc in the family Paludomidae.

This species is found in Burundi, the Democratic Republic of the Congo, Tanzania, and Zambia. Its natural habitat is freshwater lakes.
