= Stormsia =

Stormsia may refer to two genera of gastropods in the family Paludomidae:

- Stormsia Bourguignat, 1891, treated as a synonym of Syrnolopsis
- Stormsia Leloup, 1953, treated as a synonym of Leloupiella
