= Anceya giraudi =

Conservation status
- Least Concern (IUCN 3.1)

Scientific classification
- Kingdom: Animalia
- Phylum: Mollusca
- Class: Gastropoda
- Subclass: Caenogastropoda
- Order: incertae sedis
- Family: Paludomidae
- Genus: Anceya
- Species: A. giraudi

Binomial name
- Anceya giraudi Bourguignat, 1885

Synonyms
- Anceya admirabilis Bourguignat, 1890 (junior synonym); Anceya bella Pilsbry & Bequaert, 1927 (junior synonym); Anceya rufocincta E. A. Smith, 1906 (junior synonym)

Species of gastropod

Anceya giraudi is a species of tropical freshwater snail with a gill and an operculum, an aquatic gastropod mollusk in the family Paludomidae.

This species is found in Burundi, the Democratic Republic of the Congo, Tanzania, and Zambia. Its natural habitat is freshwater lakes.

Anceya giraudi was considered an Endangered species in 1996.

== Description ==
The length of the shell attains 9 mm, its diameter 2 mm.

(Original description in Latin) The shell is very narrowly fissured (the fissure almost entirely covered), elongated, cylindrical, somewhat acuminated, fragile, pellucid, shiny, uniformly reddish-horny or diaphanous-yellowish. It is most elegantly ornamented (except for the smooth initial 2-3 whorls) with produced, very regular transverse folds, equally distant from each other in a slightly oblique direction from right to left.

The spire is elongated, slightly acuminated, and rather acute at the apex. There are 12-13 closely coiled whorls, scarcely convex, separated by an impressed and plicate-fimbriated suture.

The body whorl is small, somewhat convex, plicate (the folds more closely approximated towards the aperture), and prominently carinate (the carina spiral, produced, acute) and finely striolate below.

The aperture is oblique, irregularly oblong in a slightly oblique direction from right to left, and biangulate-canaliculate (one canaliculus superiorly at the insertion of the outer lip; the other inferiorly at the base of the columella), and plicate internally. The parietal fold is at the upper part of the columella; there is one deep, lamelliform, and median palatal fold.

The outer margin is anteriorly arcuate. The columella is straight, slightly twisted, and somewhat receding. The peristome is slightly thickened, expanded especially at the canaliculi, and reflexed and dilated at the columellar margin. The margins are joined by a thin white callus.
