= Anceya =

Scientific classification
- Kingdom: Animalia
- Phylum: Mollusca
- Class: Gastropoda
- Subclass: Caenogastropoda
- Order: incertae sedis
- Family: Paludomidae
- Genus: Anceya; Bourguignat, 1885

Diversity
- 2 species

Synonyms
- Burtonilla E. A. Smith, 1904

Genus of gastropods

Anceya is a genus of tropical freshwater snails with an operculum, aquatic gastropod mollusks in the subfamily Hauttecoeuriinae of thee family Paludomidae.

== Etymology ==
The name Anceya is in honor of César Marie Félix Ancey.

== Distribution ==
This genus is endemic to Lake Tanganyika.

== Description ==
(Original description in French) This new genus is created for a very small, dextral clausiliiform shell possessing a columellar fold and a palatal fold, like Clausilia, but lacking a clausilium, like Temesa, with which it cannot be assimilated. Indeed, in Temesa, the two characteristic parietal folds, which are never absent, are only inferior and do not extend to the upper whorls, whereas in our new genus, the columellar parietal fold spirals up to the apex of the axis, similar to Sesteria or Syrnolopsis. Furthermore, the shape and ornamentation of Anceya are so different from those of Temesa that it would be foolish to classify our new genus within that genus.

To form an idea of Anceya's mode of ornamentation, one only needs to examine Clausilia lanzai from Dalmatia, and even then, one will only have a weak, very imperfect idea of the Anceyan costulations.

Anceya, with the exception of the two upper whorls, is entirely covered by large, lamellar folds, very regular, widely spaced from each other, and directed in a slightly oblique manner from right to left. These folds do not resemble ordinary ribs; instead, being very broad at their base and thinned at their edge (consequently pyramidal), they imitate the pinches that fingers would produce on a malleable material. The body whorl, in addition to these folds, is ornamented towards its lower two-thirds with an elevated, carinating spiral rib, circumscribing the inferior surface. This surface is almost flat and finely striolated, as the large folds abruptly stop at this spiral rib.

To these singular characteristics, one must also add those of the aperture. This presents two canaliform sinuses: one at the base of the columella, the other superiorly at the insertion of the outer lip. This insertion is relatively very distant from the convexity of the penultimate whorl.

This genus to which I attribute the name of one of our friends, C. F. Ancey, one of the founding members of the Société malacologique de France, is thus one of the most singular, and despite its singularity, I believe it must take its place in the classification, alongside the genera Temesa, Balia, Abbadia, etc.

== Species ==
This genus includes the following two species:

- Anceya giraudi Bourguignat, 1885 - type species
- Anceya terebriformis (Smith, 1890)

Synonyms

- Anceya admirabilis Bourguignat, 1890: synonym of Anceya giraudi Bourguignat, 1885 (junior synonym)
- Anceya bella Pilsbry & Bequaert, 1927: synonym of Anceya giraudi Bourguignat, 1885 (junior synonym)
- Anceya rufocincta E. A. Smith, 1906: synonym of Anceya giraudi Bourguignat, 1885 (junior synonym)
