= Lavigeria coronata =

Lavigera coronata

Conservation status
- Near Threatened (IUCN 3.1)

Scientific classification
- Kingdom: Animalia
- Phylum: Mollusca
- Class: Gastropoda
- Subclass: Caenogastropoda
- Order: incertae sedis
- Family: Paludomidae
- Genus: Lavigeria
- Species: L. coronata

Binomial name
- Lavigeria coronata Bourguignat, 1888

Species of gastropod

Lavigeria coronata is a species of tropical freshwater snail with a gill and an operculum, aquatic gastropod molluscs in the family Paludomidae.

This species is found in the Democratic Republic of the Congo and Tanzania. Its natural habitat is freshwater lakes. It is threatened by habitat loss.
