= Bridouxia smithiana =

Conservation status
- Data Deficient (IUCN 3.1)

Scientific classification
- Kingdom: Animalia
- Phylum: Mollusca
- Class: Gastropoda
- Subclass: Caenogastropoda
- Family: Paludomidae
- Genus: Bridouxia
- Species: B. smithiana

Binomial name
- Bridouxia smithiana (Bourguignat, 1885)

Synonyms
- Stanleya smithiana Bourguignat, 1885; Bridouxiana smithiana Bourguignat [orth. error]

Species of gastropod

Bridouxia smithiana is a species of tropical freshwater snail with a gill and an operculum, an aquatic gastropod mollusc in the family Paludomidae.

This species is found in Lake Tanganyika in the Democratic Republic of the Congo and Tanzania. Its natural habitat is freshwater lakes. The threats are not exactly known but sedimentation is possible. Its status was Endangered since 1996 but was relisted as Data Deficient in 2004.
