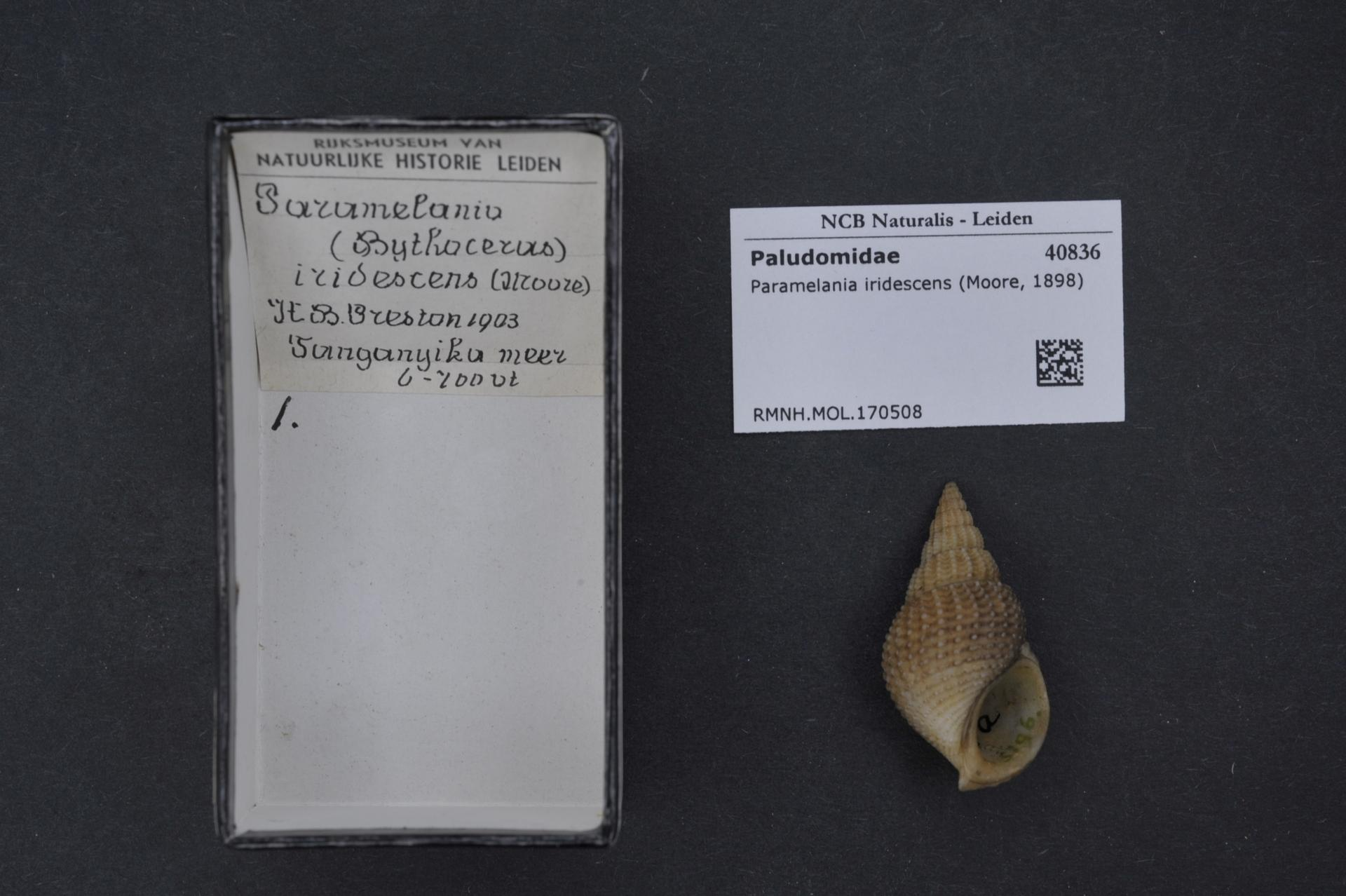

Conservation status
- Least Concern (IUCN 3.1)

Scientific classification
- Kingdom: Animalia
- Phylum: Mollusca
- Class: Gastropoda
- Subclass: Caenogastropoda
- Family: Paludomidae
- Genus: Paramelania
- Species: P. iridescens

Binomial name
- Paramelania iridescens (Moore, 1898)

Synonyms
- Bythoceras iridescens Moore, 1898

= Paramelania iridescens =

Species of gastropod

Paramelania iridescens is a species of tropical freshwater snail with an operculum, aquatic gastropod mollusk in the family Paludomidae.

== Distribution ==
This species is found in Lake Tanganyika in Burundi, also in the Democratic Republic of the Congo, Tanzania, and Zambia.

The type locality is towards the south shore near Sumbu, Lake Tanganyika, in depths of 182–213 m (600–700 ft).

== Shell description ==
There is a spine in the upper part and in the lower part of the aperture of mature specimens.

The width of the shell is 19 mm. The height of the shell is 40 mm.

== Ecology ==
This snail lives in Lake Tanganyika in depths of 10–150 m. It lives on a mud substrate.
