= Syrnolopsis gracilis =

Conservation status
- Least Concern (IUCN 3.1)

Scientific classification
- Kingdom: Animalia
- Phylum: Mollusca
- Class: Gastropoda
- Subclass: Caenogastropoda
- Order: incertae sedis
- Family: Paludomidae
- Genus: Syrnolopsis
- Species: S. gracilis

Binomial name
- Syrnolopsis gracilis Pilsbry & Bequaert, 1927

Species of gastropod

Syrnolopsis gracilis is a species of medium-sized freshwater snails with an operculum, an aquatic gastropod mollusk in the family Paludomidae. This species is found in Lake Tanganyika which includes the countries of Burundi, the Democratic Republic of the Congo, Tanzania, and Zambia. The natural habitat of this species is freshwater lakes.
