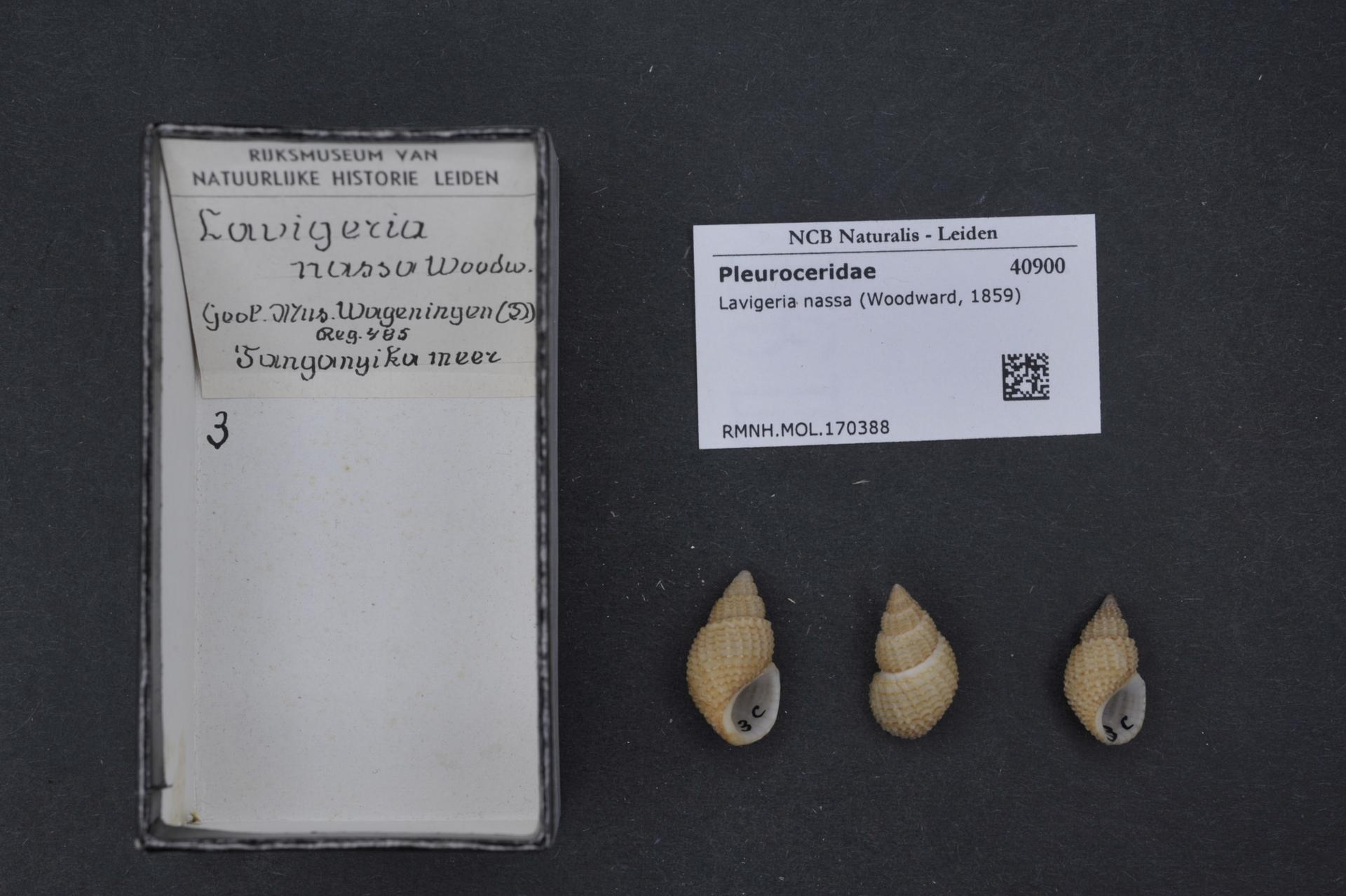

Conservation status
- Least Concern (IUCN 3.1)

Scientific classification
- Kingdom: Animalia
- Phylum: Mollusca
- Class: Gastropoda
- Subclass: Caenogastropoda
- Order: incertae sedis
- Family: Paludomidae
- Genus: Lavigeria
- Species: L. nassa

Binomial name
- Lavigeria nassa (Woodward, 1859)

Synonyms
- Tiphobia (Paramelania) nassa Woodward var. paucicostata E. A. Smith, 1881

= Lavigeria nassa =

Species of gastropod

Lavigeria nassa is a species of tropical freshwater snail with a gill and an operculum, aquatic gastropod mollusc in the family Paludomidae.

This species is found in Burundi, the Democratic Republic of the Congo, Tanzania, and Zambia. Its natural habitat is freshwater lakes.
