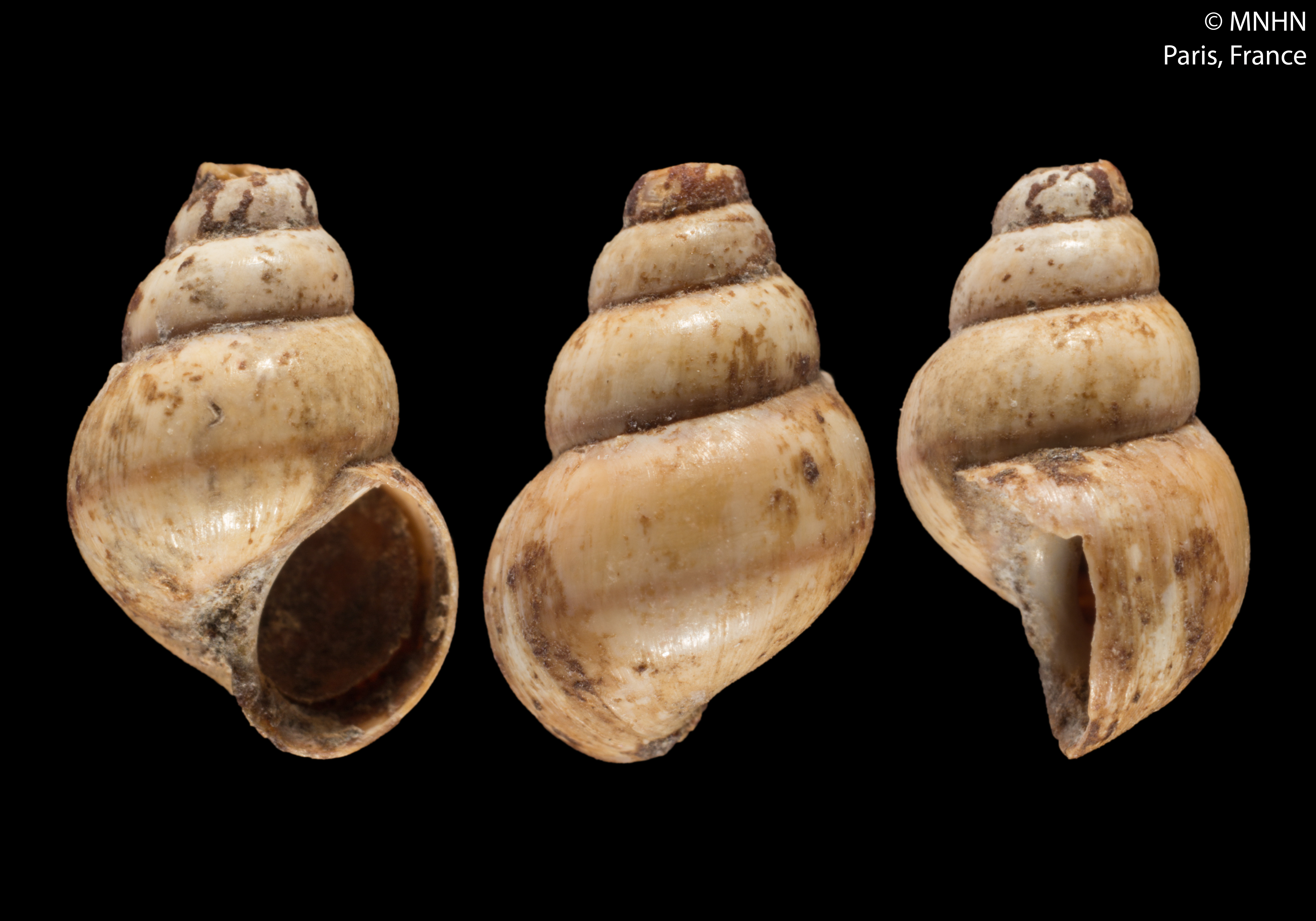
- Shell of Cleopatra bulimoides (syntype at MNHN, Paris)

Conservation status
- Least Concern (IUCN 3.1)

Scientific classification
- Kingdom: Animalia
- Phylum: Mollusca
- Class: Gastropoda
- Subclass: Caenogastropoda
- Order: incertae sedis
- Family: Paludomidae
- Genus: Cleopatra
- Species: C. bulimoides

Binomial name
- Cleopatra bulimoides (Olivier, 1804)

Synonyms
- Cleopatra pauli Bourguignat, 1885; Cleopatra pirothi Jickeli, 1881 (junior synonym); Cyclostoma bulimoides Olivier, 1804; Paludina senegalensis Morelet, 1860 (junior synonym)

= Cleopatra bulimoides =

Species of gastropod

Cleopatra bulimoides is a species of freshwater snails with an operculum, aquatic gastropod molluscs in the family Paludomidae.

Cleopatra bulimoides is the type species of the genus Cleopatra.

The holotype was found inside a mummy of an ibis (Alexandria channel, Egypt)

Varieties

- Cleopatra bulimoides var. richardi Germain, 1911
- Cleopatra bulimoides var. welwitschi E. von Martens, 1897
- Cleopatra bulimoides var. nsendweensis Dupuis & Putzeys, 1902: synonym of Cleopatra nsendweensis (Dupuis & Putzeys, 1902) (basionym)

== Distribution ==
This species occurs in:

- Egypt
- Benin
- Sudan
- ...

== Ecology ==
Parasites of Cleopatra bulimoides include the trematode Aspidogaster conchicola.
