= Cleopatra africana =

Conservation status
- Least Concern (IUCN 3.1)

Scientific classification
- Kingdom: Animalia
- Phylum: Mollusca
- Class: Gastropoda
- Subclass: Caenogastropoda
- Order: incertae sedis
- Family: Paludomidae
- Genus: Cleopatra
- Species: C. africana

Binomial name
- Cleopatra africana (Martens, 1878)

Species of gastropod

Cleopatra africana is a species of freshwater snails with an operculum, aquatic gastropod molluscs in the family Paludomidae.

This species is found in Kenya and Tanzania. Its natural habitats are rivers and swamps.
