= Cleopatra cridlandi =

Conservation status
- Critically Endangered (IUCN 3.1)

Scientific classification
- Kingdom: Animalia
- Phylum: Mollusca
- Class: Gastropoda
- Subclass: Caenogastropoda
- Order: incertae sedis
- Family: Paludomidae
- Genus: Cleopatra
- Species: C. cridlandi

Binomial name
- Cleopatra cridlandi Mandahl-Barth, 1954

Species of gastropod

Cleopatra cridlandi is a species of freshwater snail with an operculum, aquatic gastropod molluscs in the family Paludomidae.

This species is found in Kenya, Tanzania, and Uganda. Its natural habitat is freshwater lakes.
