= Lavigeria =

Scientific classification
- Kingdom: Animalia
- Phylum: Mollusca
- Class: Gastropoda
- Subclass: Caenogastropoda
- Order: incertae sedis
- Family: Paludomidae
- Genus: Lavigeria; Bourguignat, 1888

Genus of gastropods

Lavigeria is a genus of tropical freshwater snails with a gill and an operculum, aquatic gastropod molluscs in the family Paludomidae.

All species are restricted to Lake Tanganyika in Africa, and share in common a strong heavy shell with sculpture more characteristic of marine gastropods.

== Species ==
Species within genus Lavigeria include:

- Lavigeria coronata Bourguignat, 1888
- Lavigeria grandis (Smith, 1881)
- Lavigeria nassa (Woodward, 1859)
- Lavigeria paucicostata (Bourguignat, 1888)
