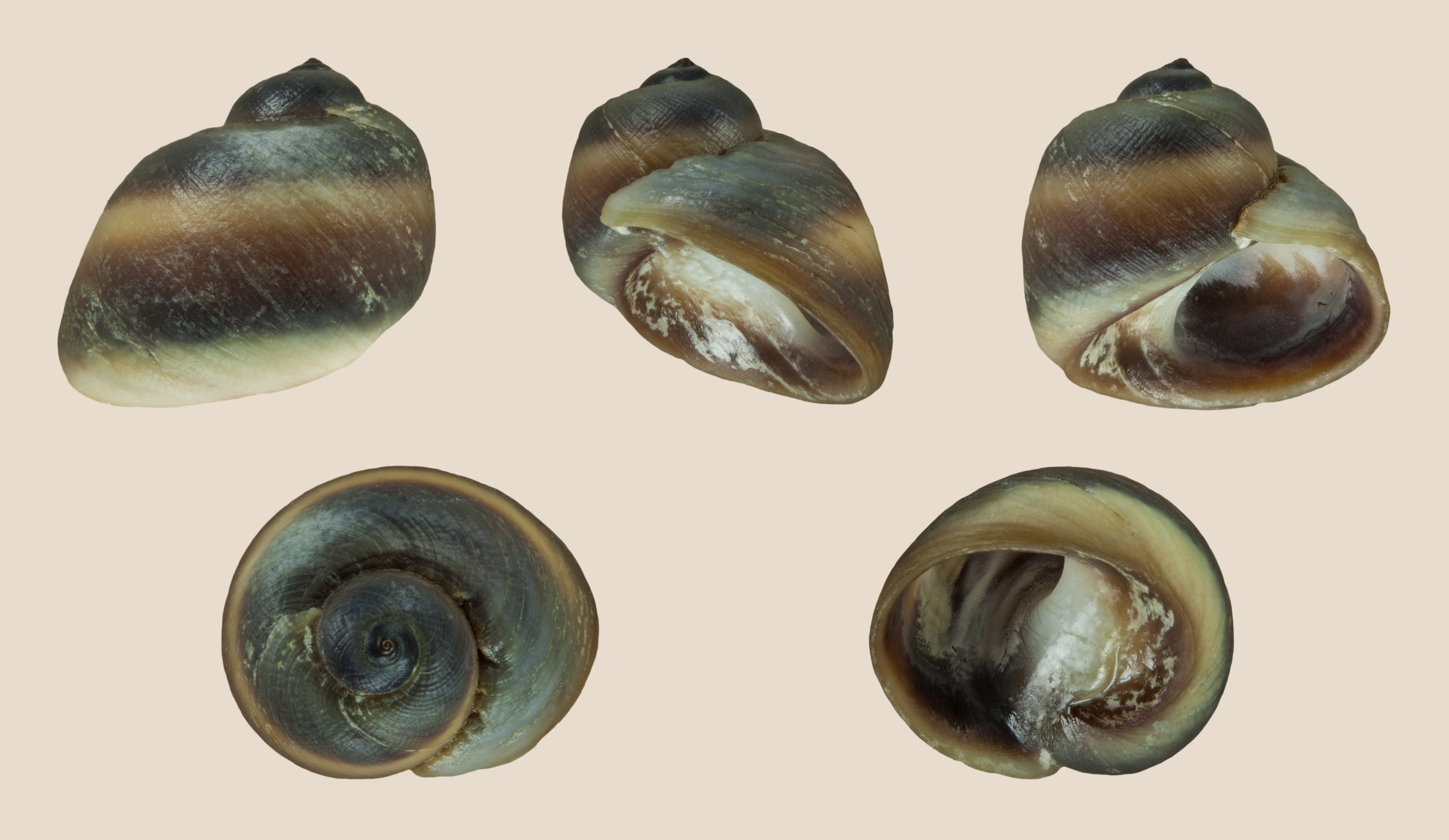

Conservation status
- Least Concern (IUCN 3.1)

Scientific classification
- Kingdom: Animalia
- Phylum: Mollusca
- Class: Gastropoda
- Subclass: Caenogastropoda
- Family: Paludomidae
- Genus: Spekia
- Species: S. zonata

Binomial name
- Spekia zonata (Woodward, 1859)

= Spekia zonata =

Species of gastropod

Spekia zonata is a species of freshwater snail, an aquatic gastropod mollusk in the family Paludomidae. This species is found in Burundi and the Democratic Republic of the Congo. Its natural habitat is freshwater lakes. The species feeds by scraping algae and organic material from rocks using a specialized ribbon-like structure called a radula. Studies of its radular teeth show differences in hardness and flexibility that allow the snail to efficiently scrape surfaces and collect food particles.
