= Mysorelloides =

Conservation status
- Least Concern (IUCN 3.1)

Scientific classification
- Kingdom: Animalia
- Phylum: Mollusca
- Class: Gastropoda
- Subclass: Caenogastropoda
- Family: Paludomidae
- Subfamily: Hauttecoeuriinae
- Tribe: Tiphobiini
- Genus: Mysorelloides; Leloup, 1953
- Species: M. multisulcata

Binomial name
- Mysorelloides multisulcata (Bourguignat, 1888)

Genus of gastropods

Mysorelloides multisulcata is a species of tropical freshwater snail with an operculum, an aquatic gastropod mollusk in the family Paludomidae.

Mysorelloides multisulcata is the only species in the genus Mysorelloides.

It is found in Burundi, the Democratic Republic of the Congo, Tanzania, and Zambia. Its natural habitat is freshwater lakes.
