= Cleopatra exarata =

Conservation status
- Vulnerable (IUCN 3.1)

Scientific classification
- Kingdom: Animalia
- Phylum: Mollusca
- Class: Gastropoda
- Subclass: Caenogastropoda
- Order: incertae sedis
- Family: Paludomidae
- Genus: Cleopatra
- Species: C. exarata

Binomial name
- Cleopatra exarata (Martens, 1878)

Synonyms
- Paludomus exarata Martens, 1878

Species of gastropod

Cleopatra exarata is a species of freshwater snails with an operculum, aquatic gastropod molluscs in the family Paludomidae.

This species is endemic to Kenya. Its natural habitats are rivers and intermittent rivers. It is threatened by habitat loss.
