= Martelia tanganyicensis =

Conservation status
- Data Deficient (IUCN 3.1)

Scientific classification
- Kingdom: Animalia
- Phylum: Mollusca
- Class: Gastropoda
- Subclass: Caenogastropoda
- Order: incertae sedis
- Family: Paludomidae
- Genus: Martelia
- Species: M. tanganyicensis

Binomial name
- Martelia tanganyicensis Dautzenberg, 1908

Species of gastropod

Martelia tanganyicensis is a species of tropical freshwater snail with an operculum, aquatic gastropod mollusc in the family Paludomidae.

The specific name tanganyicensis is derived from the name of Lake Tanganyika.

This species is found in Burundi, the Democratic Republic of the Congo, Tanzania and Zambia.
