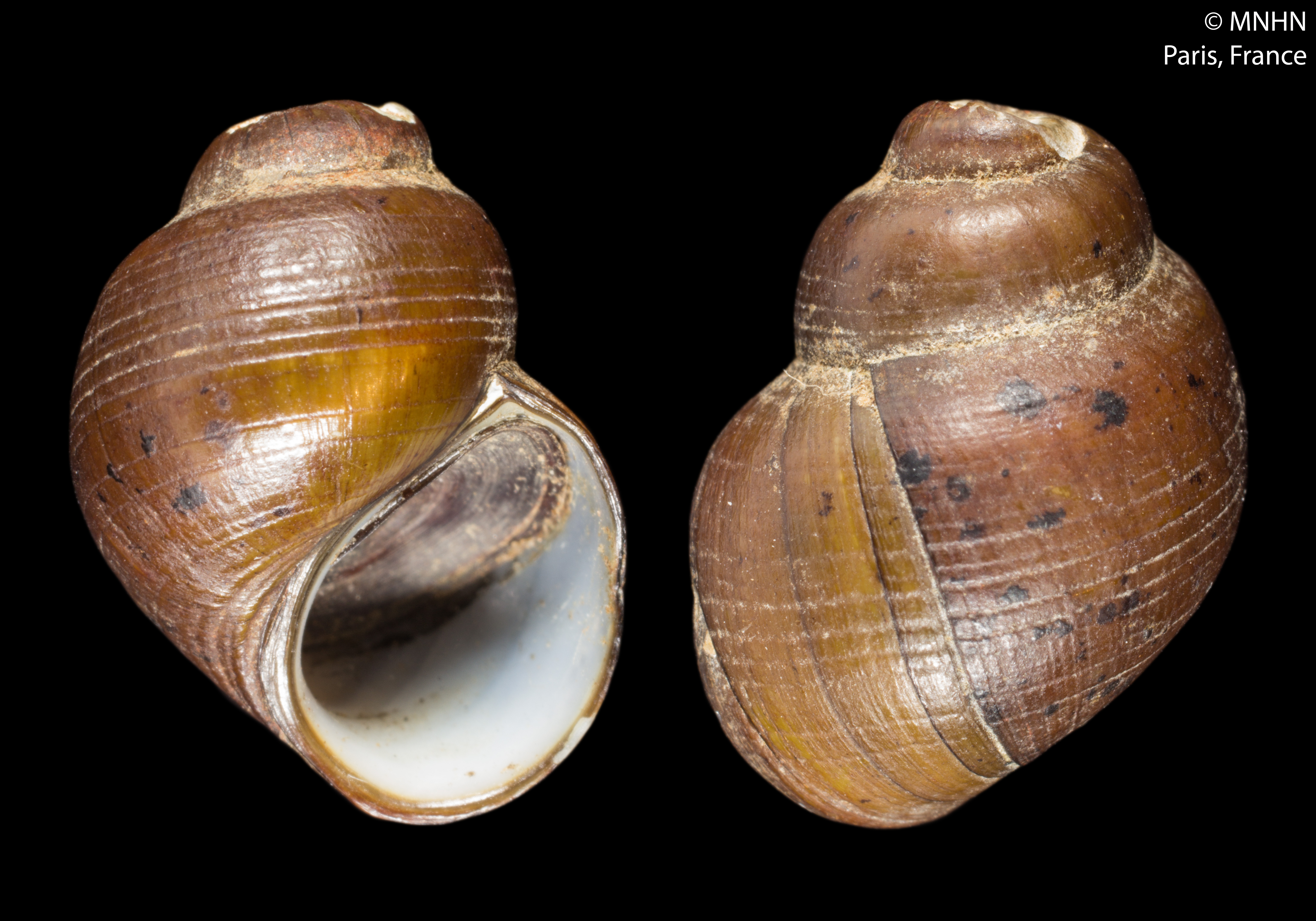
- Shell of Cleopatra grandidieri (syntype at MNHN, Paris)

Conservation status
- Near Threatened (IUCN 3.1)

Scientific classification
- Kingdom: Animalia
- Phylum: Mollusca
- Class: Gastropoda
- Subclass: Caenogastropoda
- Order: incertae sedis
- Family: Paludomidae
- Genus: Cleopatra
- Species: C. grandidieri

Binomial name
- Cleopatra grandidieri Crosse & Fischer, 1872

Synonyms
- Paludomus grandidieri Crosse & P. Fischer, 1872; Paludomus grandidieri var. submutica Crosse & P. Fischer, 1878

= Cleopatra grandidieri =

Species of gastropod

Cleopatra grandidieri is a species of freshwater snails with an operculum, aquatic gastropod molluscs in the family Paludomidae.

This species is endemic to Madagascar.
