= Limnotrochus =

Conservation status
- Least Concern (IUCN 3.1)

Scientific classification
- Kingdom: Animalia
- Phylum: Mollusca
- Class: Gastropoda
- Subclass: Caenogastropoda
- Family: Paludomidae
- Subfamily: Hauttecoeuriinae
- Tribe: Tiphobiini
- Genus: Limnotrochus; E. A. Smith, 1880
- Species: L. thomsoni

Binomial name
- Limnotrochus thomsoni E. A. Smith, 1880

Synonyms
- Species synonymy: Limnotrochus cyclostoma Bourguignat, 1885; Limnotrochus giraudi Bourguignat, 1885

Genus of molluscs

Limnotrochus is a monotypic genus in the family Paludomidae containing the single species Limnotrochus thomsoni, a tropical freshwater snail with gills and an operculum, aquatic gastropod mollusk. It is endemic to Lake Tanganyika.

The specific name thomsoni is in honor of Scottish explorer Joseph Thomson.

== Distribution ==
Limnotrochus thomsoni is endemic to Lake Tanganyika and is found in all countries surrounding the lake: Burundi, the Democratic Republic of the Congo, Tanzania, and Zambia. The type locality is Lake Tanganyika.

== Description ==
The shell measures 14 mm (0.55 in) in width and 19 mm (0.75 in) in height.

== Ecology and threats ==
Limnotrochus thomsoni lives in depths 4–30 m (13–98 ft) on silt and sandy bottoms of Lake Tanganyika. It is potentially threatened by sedimentation.
