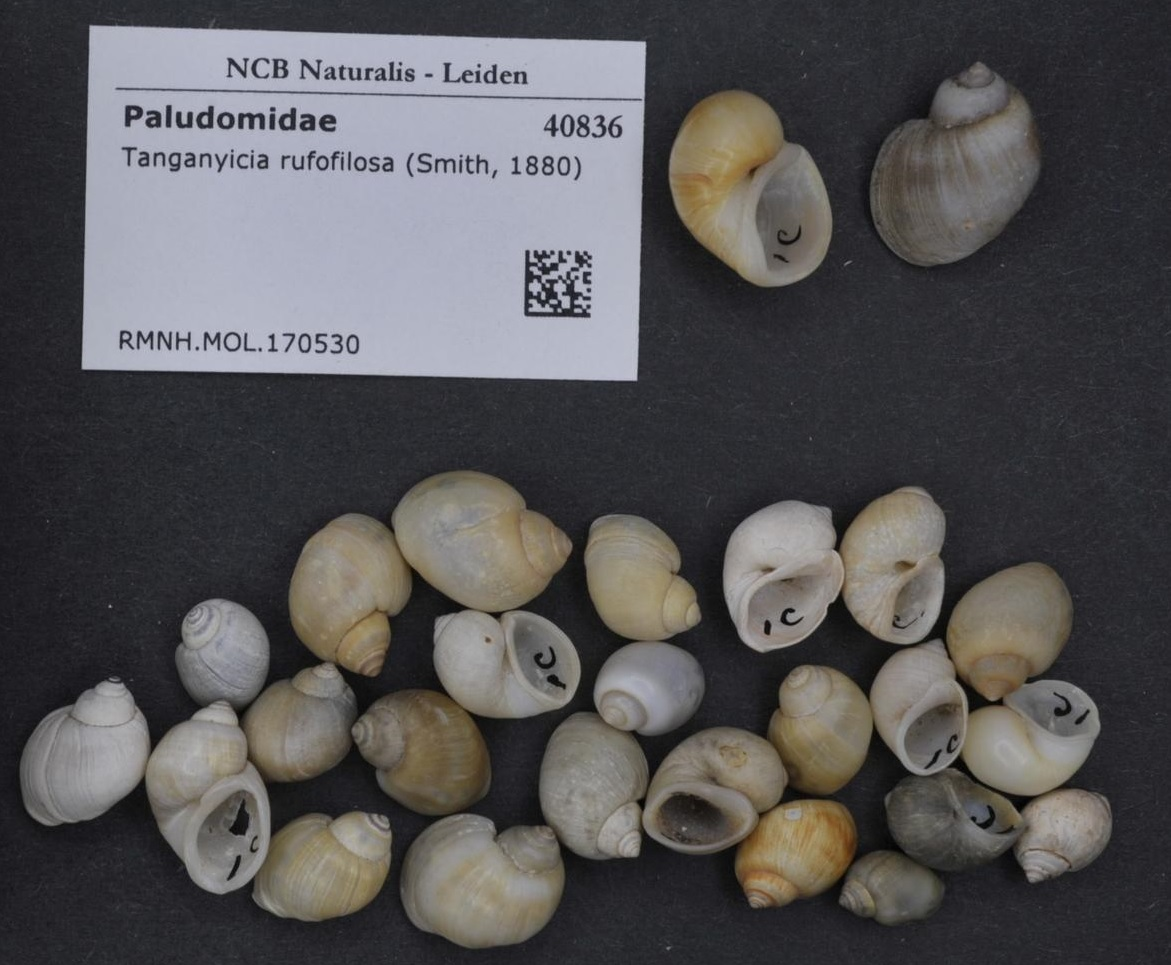

Conservation status
- Near Threatened (IUCN 3.1)

Scientific classification
- Kingdom: Animalia
- Phylum: Mollusca
- Class: Gastropoda
- Subclass: Caenogastropoda
- Family: Paludomidae
- Genus: Tanganyicia
- Species: T. rufofilosa

Binomial name
- Tanganyicia rufofilosa (E. A. Smith, 1880)

Synonyms
- Lithoglyphus rufofilosus E. A. Smith, 1880

= Tanganyicia rufofilosa =

Species of gastropod

Tanganyicia rufofilosa is a species of tropical freshwater snail with an operculum, an aquatic gastropod mollusk in the family Paludomidae.

Before 2002, this species was placed within the family Thiaridae.

== Distribution ==
Tanganyicia rufofilosa is endemic to Lake Tanganyika. It is found in Burundi, the Democratic Republic of the Congo, Tanzania, and Zambia. The type locality is Lake Tanganyika.

== Description ==
The shape of the shell is ovate conic.

The width of the shell is 14 millimetres (0.55 in); the height of the shell is 17 millimetres (0.67 in).

== Ecology ==
The natural habitat of this snail is freshwater lakes. Tanganyicia rufofilosa lives in depths 5–25 metres (16–82 ft) on silty and sandy bottoms, in high population densities.

The females are viviparous.

In 1996, this was considered an Endangered Species. Its survival is threatened mainly by sedimentation. The habitats of this species are damaged by settlements and other disturbances.
