= Bridouxia ponsonbyi =

Conservation status
- Near Threatened (IUCN 3.1)

Scientific classification
- Kingdom: Animalia
- Phylum: Mollusca
- Class: Gastropoda
- Subclass: Caenogastropoda
- Family: Paludomidae
- Genus: Bridouxia
- Species: B. ponsonbyi

Binomial name
- Bridouxia ponsonbyi (Smith, 1889)

Synonyms
- Bridouxiana ponsonbyi Smith [orth. error]

Species of gastropod

Bridouxia ponsonbyi is a species of tropical freshwater snail with a gill and an operculum, an aquatic gastropod mollusc in the family Paludomidae.

This species is found in Burundi, Tanzania, and Zambia. Its natural habitat is freshwater lakes. It is threatened by habitat loss.
