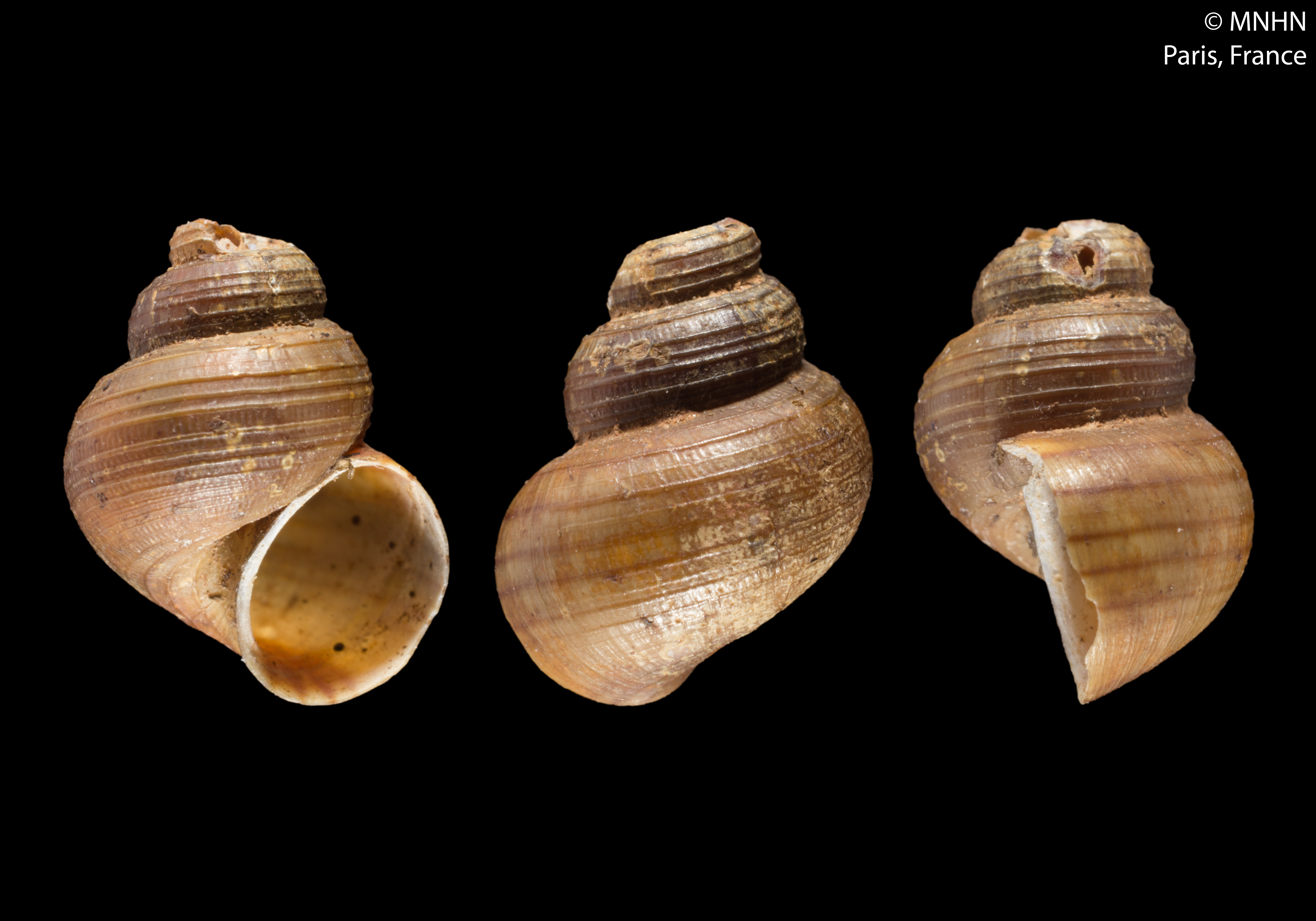
- Shell of Cleopatra madagascariensis (syntype at MNHN, Paris)

Scientific classification
- Kingdom: Animalia
- Phylum: Mollusca
- Class: Gastropoda
- Subclass: Caenogastropoda
- Order: incertae sedis
- Superfamily: Cerithioidea
- Family: Paludomidae
- Genus: Cleopatra; Troschel, 1857

Diversity
- about 20 freshwater species

= Cleopatra (gastropod) =

Genus of gastropods

Cleopatra is a genus of freshwater snails with an operculum, aquatic gastropod molluscs in the family Paludomidae within the subfamily Cleopatrinae.

Cleopatra is the type genus of the subfamily Cleopatrinae.

The diploid chromosome number of Cleopatra bulimoides is 2n=28.

== Distribution ==
The distribution of the species within this genus includes Egypt.

== Species ==
The genus Cleopatra includes the following species:

- † Cleopatra adami Neiber & Glaubrecht, 2019
- Cleopatra africana (Martens, 1878)
- †Cleopatra angulata Williamson, 1979
- † Cleopatra arambourgi Roger, 1944
- Cleopatra athiensis Verdcourt, 1957
- Cleopatra bulimoides (Olivier, 1804) - type species
- Cleopatra colbeaui (Craven, 1880)
- Cleopatra cridlandi Mandahl-Barth, 1954
- Cleopatra cyclostomoides
  - Cleopatra cyclostomoides cyclostomoides
  - Cleopatra cyclostomoides tchadiensis Germain 1907
- † Cleopatra dubia Adam, 1959
- Cleopatra elata Dautzenberg & Germain, 1914
- Cleopatra exarata (Martens, 1878)
- Cleopatra ferruginea (I. & H. C. Lea, 1850)
- Cleopatra grandidieri (Crosse & Fischer, 1872)
- Cleopatra guillemei Bourguignat, 1885
- Cleopatra hemmingi Verdcourt, 1956
- † Cleopatra johnstoni Smith, 1893
- Cleopatra kaisoensis Van Damme & Pickford, 2003
- Cleopatra langi Pilsbry & Bequaert, 1927
- † Cleopatra lepersonnei (Gautier, 1970)
- Cleopatra lesnei Germain, 1935
- Cleopatra madagascariensis (Crosse & Fischer, 1872)
- Cleopatra mweruensis Smith, 1893
- Cleopatra nsendweensis Dupuis & Putzeys, 1902
- Cleopatra obscura Mandahl-Barth, 1968
- Cleopatra pilula Mandahl-Barth, 1967
- Cleopatra poutrini Lamy, 1909
- Cleopatra rugosa Connolly, 1925
- Cleopatra smithi Ancey, 1906
- † Cleopatra vanloockei Van Damme & Pickford, 2003

Taxa inquirenda

- Cleopatra clara Pilsbry & Bequaert, 1927
- Cleopatra congener Preston, 1913
- Cleopatra laurenti Bourguignat, 1879
- Cleopatra lhotellerii Bourguignat, 1879
- Cleopatra mareotica Bourguignat, 1879
- Cleopatra percarinata Bourguignat, 1885
- Cleopatra raymondi Bourguignat, 1879
- Cleopatra soleilleti Bourguignat, 1885

Species brought into synonymy

- Cleopatra broecki Putzeys, 1899 - synonym: Potadomoides broecki (Putzeys, 1899)
- Cleopatra cameroni Bourguignat, 1879: synonym of Cleopatra ferruginea (I. Lea & H. C. Lea, 1851)
- Cleopatra pauli Bourguignat, 1885: synonym of Cleopatra bulimoides (Olivier, 1804)

== Ecology ==
The habitat of species in this genus includes slow-running freshwater streams.

Parasites of Cleopatra include:

- Serves as an intermediate host for Prohemistomum vivax.
