= Anceya terebriformis =

Conservation status
- Data Deficient (IUCN 3.1)

Scientific classification
- Kingdom: Animalia
- Phylum: Mollusca
- Class: Gastropoda
- Subclass: Caenogastropoda
- Family: Paludomidae
- Genus: Anceya
- Species: A. terebriformis

Binomial name
- Anceya terebriformis (Smith, 1890)

Synonyms
- Turbonilla terebriformis E. A. Smith, 1890 (original combination)

Species of gastropod

Anceya terebriformis is a species of tropical freshwater snail with an operculum, aquatic gastropod mollusk in the family Paludomidae.

Anceya terebriformis has been considered as an endangered species in 1996.

== Description ==
The length of the shell attains 12 mm, its diameter 2.7 mm.

(Original description in Latin) The shell is subulate, shiny, grayish-white, and pale lilac superiorly. It is obliquely ribbed and striated. There are about 18 whorls, slowly increasing in size. The apical whorls are (?), the next 3-4 are convex, thinly longitudinally striated, and bi-angulate around the middle. The remaining whorls are convex (the upper ones more convex than the lower ones, very strongly ribbed), furnished with oblique, subacute, distant ribs, and striated with very thin, obliquely flexuous growth lines. The body whorl is roundly subangulate at the periphery, with the ribs becoming obsolete inferiorly. The aperture equals 1/8 of the total length. The columella is rather straight and obsoletely uniplicate superiorly.

The ribs(approximately eight in number) on the upper whorls are stronger and more widely spaced than on the lower ones, and exhibit a more convex outline. On the body whorl, their number increases to about twelve or thirteen. The aperture is somewhat broken anteriorly, which leaves the generic position of this interesting species not entirely certain. The texture and costation somewhat recall the appearance of some Terebra species.

== Distribution ==
This species is found in Lake Tanganyika in the Democratic Republic of the Congo and Tanzania. The only known threat may be sedimentation from deforestation in Tanzania.
