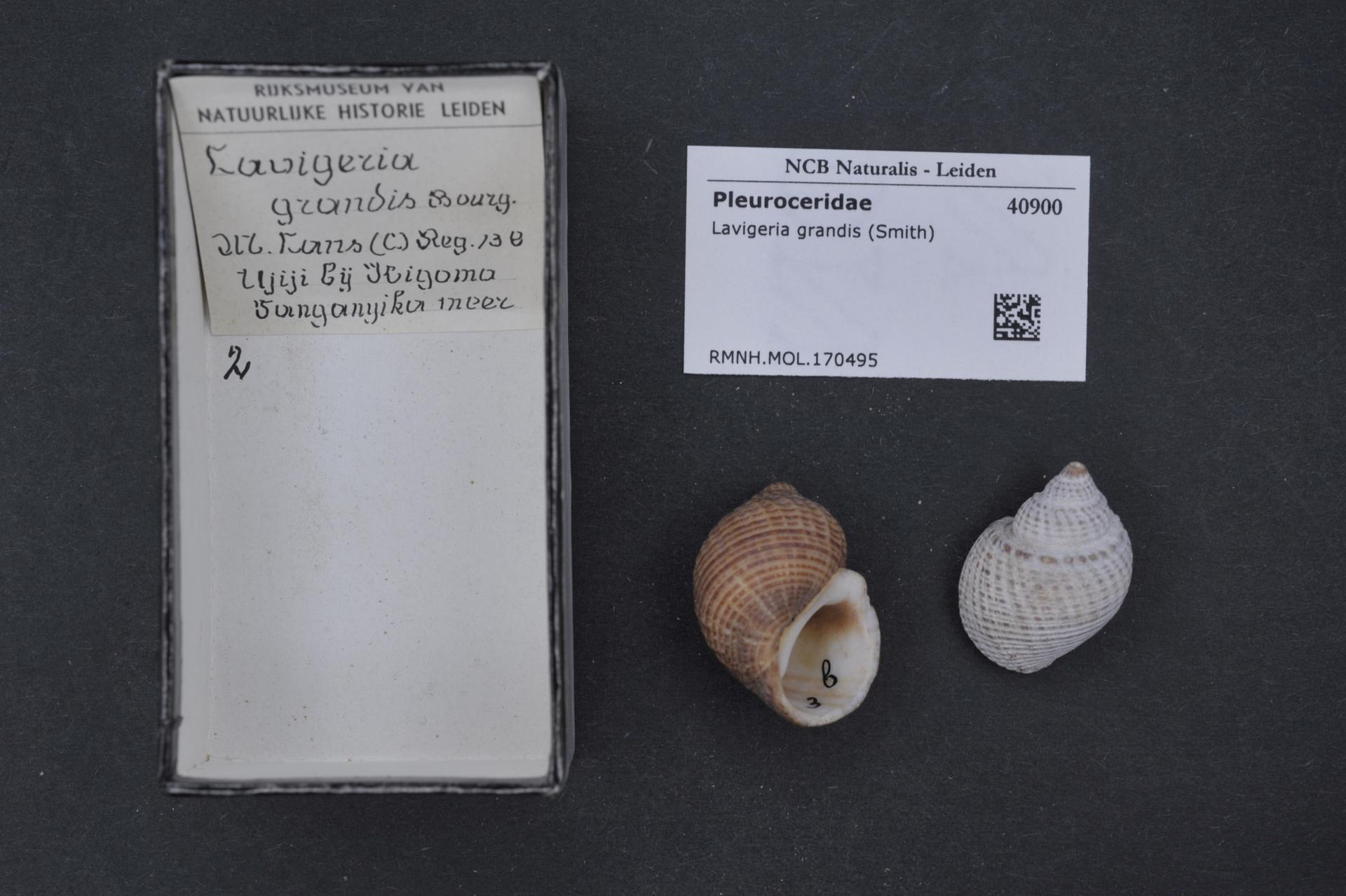
- Lavigeria grandis

Conservation status
- Least Concern (IUCN 3.1)

Scientific classification
- Kingdom: Animalia
- Phylum: Mollusca
- Class: Gastropoda
- Subclass: Caenogastropoda
- Order: incertae sedis
- Family: Paludomidae
- Genus: Lavigeria
- Species: L. grandis

Binomial name
- Lavigeria grandis (Smith, 1881)

= Lavigeria grandis =

Species of gastropod

Lavigeria grandis is a species of tropical freshwater snail with a gill and an operculum, aquatic gastropod mollusc in the family Paludomidae.

This species is found in Burundi, the Democratic Republic of the Congo, Tanzania, and Zambia. Its natural habitat is freshwater lakes.
