= Praeclara =

Praeclara may refer to:

== Biology ==
- Bridouxia praeclara, a gastropod species in the family Thiaridae
- Platanthera praeclara, a plant native to North America
- Praeclara underwing or Catocala praeclara, a moth of North America

== Religion ==
- Praeclara gratulationis publicae, an encyclical letter of Leo XIII
- In praeclara summorum, an encyclical of Pope Benedict XV
