= Tanganyicia michelae =

Conservation status
- Vulnerable (IUCN 3.1)

Scientific classification
- Kingdom: Animalia
- Phylum: Mollusca
- Class: Gastropoda
- Subclass: Caenogastropoda
- Family: Paludomidae
- Genus: Tanganyicia
- Species: T. michelae

Binomial name
- Tanganyicia michelae (West, 1999)

Species of gastropod

Tanganyicia michelae is a species of tropical freshwater snail with an operculum, an aquatic gastropod mollusk in the family Paludomidae.

== Distribution ==
Tanganyicia michelae is endemic to Lake Tanganyika. It is found in only in Kala Bay, Zambia.

== Ecology ==
The natural habitat of this snail is freshwater lakes. Tanganyicia rufofilosa lives in depths of 2–7 metres (6 ft 7 in – 23 ft 0 in) on mud and sand bottoms.

It is threatened mainly by water pollution and sedimentation.
