= Stanleya =

Stanleya is the name of two genera:

- Stanleya (gastropod), a genus of gastropod
- Stanleya (plant), a genus of plant
