= Spekia coheni =

Conservation status
- Least Concern (IUCN 3.1)

Scientific classification
- Kingdom: Animalia
- Phylum: Mollusca
- Class: Gastropoda
- Subclass: Caenogastropoda
- Family: Paludomidae
- Genus: Spekia
- Species: S. coheni

Binomial name
- Spekia coheni West, 1999

Species of gastropod

Spekia coheni is a species of freshwater snail, an aquatic gastropod mollusk in the family Paludomidae. This species is found in Burundi and the Democratic Republic of the Congo. Its natural habitat is freshwater lakes. It is threatened by habitat loss.
