= Bridouxia leucoraphe =

Conservation status
- Least Concern (IUCN 3.1)

Scientific classification
- Domain: Eukaryota
- Kingdom: Animalia
- Phylum: Mollusca
- Class: Gastropoda
- Subclass: Caenogastropoda
- Family: Paludomidae
- Genus: Bridouxia
- Species: B. leucoraphe

Binomial name
- Bridouxia leucoraphe (Ancey, 1890)

Synonyms
- Bridouxiana leucoraphe Ancey [orth. error]

Species of gastropod

Bridouxia leucoraphe is a species of tropical freshwater snail with a gill and an operculum, an aquatic gastropod mollusk in the family Paludomidae.

This species is found in Burundi, the Democratic Republic of the Congo, Tanzania, and Zambia. Its natural habitat is freshwater lakes.
