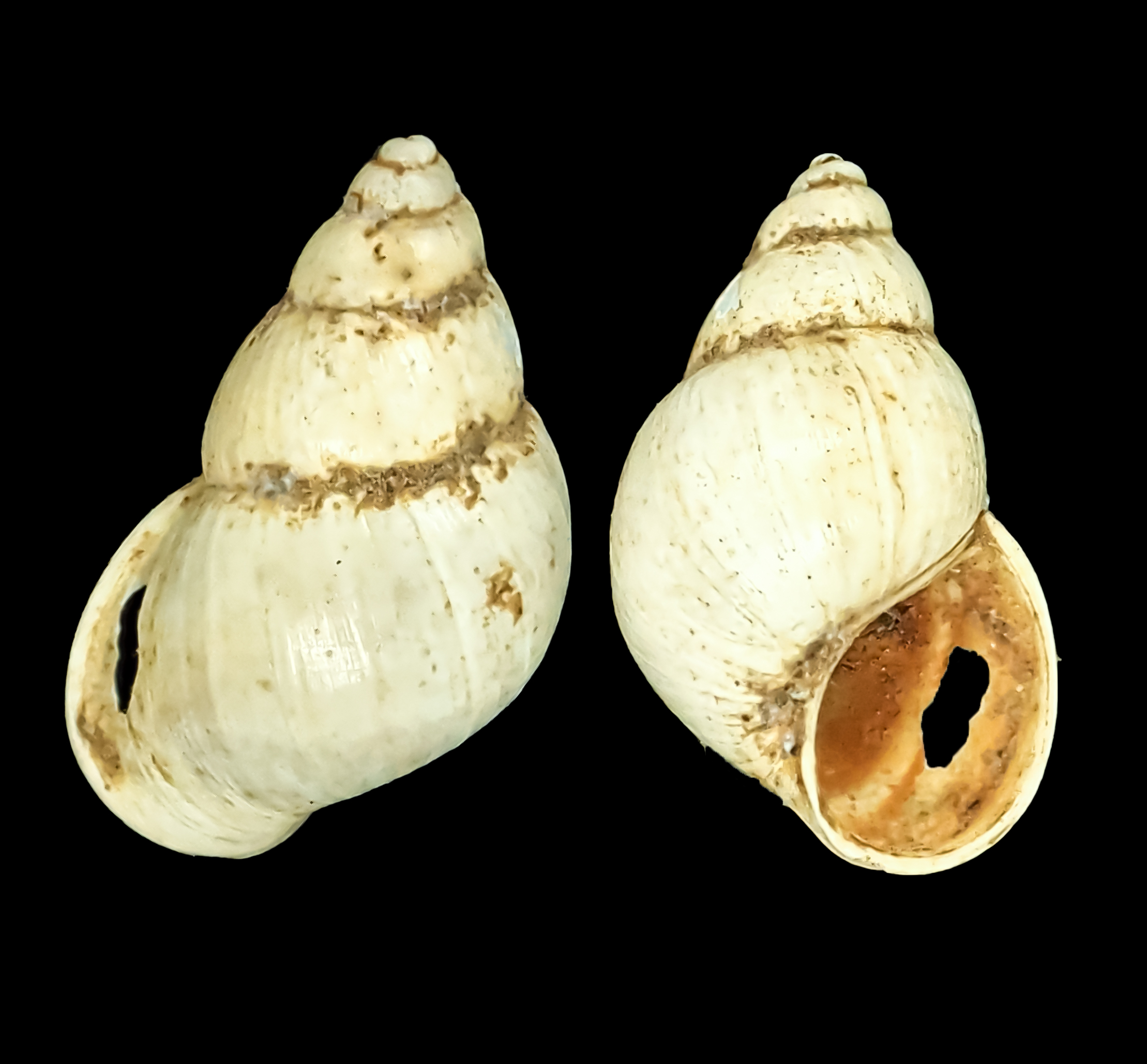
- Shell of Paludomus bogani (holotype at MNHN, Paris)

Scientific classification
- Kingdom: Animalia
- Phylum: Mollusca
- Class: Gastropoda
- Subclass: Caenogastropoda
- Order: incertae sedis
- Superfamily: Cerithioidea
- Family: Paludomidae
- Genus: Paludomus; Swainson, 1840

Type species
- Melania conica Gray, 1833

Synonyms
- Hemimitra Swainson, 1840 (junior synonym); Melania (Rivulina) I. Lea & H. C. Lea, 1851; Odontochasma Tomlin, 1930; Paludomus (Hemimitra) Swainson, 1840; Paludomus (Odontochasma) Tomlin, 1930 · alternate representation; Paludomus (Paludomus) Swainson, 1840 · alternate representation; Stomatodon Benson, 1862 unavailable; a junior homonym of Stomatodon Seeley, 1861 [Gastropoda, Ringiculidae]; † Taeniodomus Krause, 1897 (considered a subgenus of Paludomus)

= Paludomus =

Genus of gastropods

Paludomus is a genus of tropical freshwater snails with an operculum, aquatic gastropod mollusks in the subfamily Paludominae of the family Paludomidae.

Paludomus is the type genus of the family Paludomidae.

== Species ==
15 species of the genus Paludomus have been listed in the 2010 IUCN Red List of Threatened Species.

Species within the genus Paludomus include:

- Paludomus aborensis Godwin-Austen, 1918
- Paludomus ajanensis Morelet, 1860
- Paludomus andersoniana Nevill, 1877
- Paludomus annandalei Preston, 1909
- Paludomus blanfordiana Nevill, 1877
- Paludomus bogani Thach & F. Huber, 2021
- Paludomus burmanica Nevill, 1877
- Paludomus chilinoides Reeve, 1847
- Paludomus cincta Liu, Zhang & Duan, 1994
- Paludomus crassa (von dem Busch, 1842)
- Paludomus dhuma Rao, 1925
- Paludomus everetti E. A. Smith, 1894
- Paludomus franzhuberi Thach, 2021
- Paludomus globulosa (Gray in Reeve, 1847)
- † Paludomus gracilis (Krause, 1897)
- Paludomus hanleyi Dohrn, 1858
- Paludomus inflata Brot, 1880
- † Paludomus infraeocaenica Cossmann, 1892
- Paludomus loricata Reeve, 1847
- Paludomus lutea H. Adams, 1874
- Paludomus messageri (Bavay & Dautzenberg, 1900)
- Paludomus nana Nevill, 1881
- Paludomus neritoides Reeve, 1847
- Paludomus obesa (Philippi, 1847)
- Paludomus ornata Benson, 1856
- Paludomus palawanicus Brot, 1891
- Paludomus palustris Layard, 1855
- Paludomus parvula Rao, 1929
- Paludomus petrosa (A. Gould, 1844)
- † Paludomus praecursor F. Sandberger, 1870
- Paludomus punctata Reeve, 1854
- Paludomus pustulosa Annandale, 1925
- Paludomus qianensis Liu, Duan & Zhang, 1994
- Paludomus regulata Benson, 1856
- Paludomus reticulata Blanford, 1870
- Paludomus rotunda W. T. Blanford, 1870
- Paludomus siamensis W. T. Blanford, 1903
- † Paludomus sincenyensis Cossmann, 1902
- Paludomus solida Dohrn, 1857
- Paludomus stephanus Benson, 1836
- Paludomus stomatodon (Benson, 1862)
- Paludomus subfasciata E. von Martens, 1908
- † Paludomus suraiensis Gurung, 1998
- Paludomus swainsoni Dohrn, 1857
- Paludomus tanschaurica (Gmelin, 1791)
- Paludomus trifasciata Reeve, 1854
- † Paludomus triticea (A. Férussac in Deshayes, 1825)
- † Paludomus vauvillei (Cossmann, 1886)

Synonyms

- Paludomus conica Gray, 1834: synonym of Paludomus crassa (von dem Busch, 1842) (based on invalid original name)
- Paludomus sulcatus Reeve, 1847: synonym of Philopotamis sulcatus (Reeve, 1847) (original combination)
