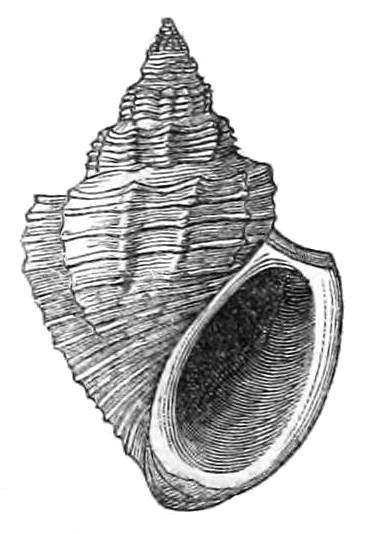
- Drawing of an apertural view of a shell of Paramelania damoni from its original description by Smith (1881)

Conservation status
- Least Concern (IUCN 3.1)

Scientific classification
- Kingdom: Animalia
- Phylum: Mollusca
- Class: Gastropoda
- Subclass: Caenogastropoda
- Family: Paludomidae
- Genus: Paramelania
- Species: P. damoni

Binomial name
- Paramelania damoni (E. A. Smith, 1881)

Synonyms
- Tiphobia (Paramelania) damoni Smith, 1881; Paramelania crassigranulata Smith, 1881

= Paramelania damoni =

Species of gastropod

Paramelania damoni is a species of tropical freshwater snail with an operculum, an aquatic gastropod mollusk in the family Paludomidae.

The specific name damoni is in honor of Robert Damon from Weymouth, who collected the type specimen.

== Distribution ==
The distribution of this species includes Lake Tanganyika in Burundi, the Democratic Republic of the Congo, Tanzania, and Zambia.

The type locality is Lake Tanganyika.

== Description ==
Paramelania damoni was originally described by Edgar Albert Smith in 1881. Smith's original text (the type description) reads as follows:

Paramelania damoni.

Shell solid, imperforate, ovate turreted, white, covered with an olive-brown epidermis, prettily sculptured with fine yet distinct wavy lines of increment, and more or less distinct transverse impressed striae. Whorls 10, very concave at the upper part, the concavity occupying about one third of the whorl; concavity smooth, merely exhibiting the epidermal sculpture; rest of the whorls coarsely plicated and spirally ridged. Plicae rather acute, about 12 in number on the penultimate whorl, a little oblique on the last, and becoming obsolete about the middle. Spiral lirae rather slender, equal, continuous on and between the plicae; 4 upon the upper volutions, and about 14 on the last. The uppermost, which defines the upper end of the costae, is produced into very short hollow scales or spines upon the ribs; and the second and sometimes the third have the same character in a less marked degree. Aperture obliquely ovate, occupying about half the length of the shell, covered with a slight callus deposit far within, not quite obscuring the external coloration. Outer lip somewhat expanded, much thickened within, white, concave above, arcuate at the side. Base also thickened and, together with the lower extremity of the whorl, forming a broad, retroverted, and very short cauda. Upper end of labrum joined to the base by a rather thick defined callosity, which spreads over the body-whorl within the mouth.

Length 35 millim., diam. above the aperture 16; aperture 15 long, 9 broad.

Operculum black, closing the aperture, but at some distance from the peristome.

The width of the shell is 28 mm. The height of the shell is 37 mm.

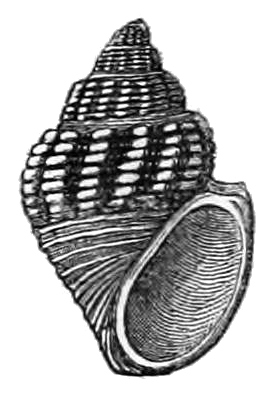
Drawing of an apertural view of a shell described as Paramelania crassigranulata. Paramelania crassigranulatawas recognized as a form of Paramelania damoni by Brown (1994).

Paramelania crassigranulata was recognized as a form of this species by Brown (1994).

== Ecology ==
This snail lives in Lake Tanganyika in depths 1.5–65 m. It lives on the bottom consisting of fine sediment, rocks or sand.
