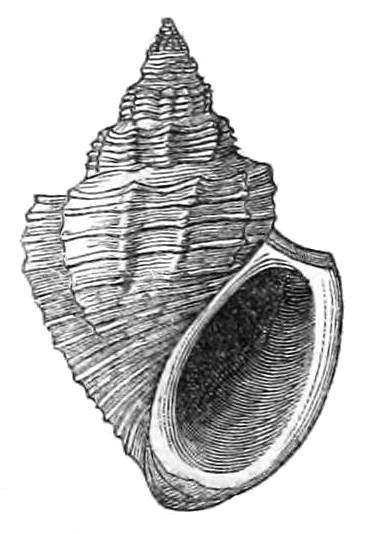
- Drawing of an apertural view of a shell of Paramelania damoni

Scientific classification
- Domain: Eukaryota
- Kingdom: Animalia
- Phylum: Mollusca
- Class: Gastropoda
- Subclass: Caenogastropoda
- Family: Paludomidae
- Genus: Paramelania; E. A. Smith, 1881

Diversity
- 2 described species, possibly more species

= Paramelania =

Genus of gastropods

Paramelania is a genus of tropical freshwater snails with an operculum, aquatic gastropod mollusks in the family Paludomidae.

== Distribution ==
Species of the genus Paramelania live in Lake Tanganyika, Africa.

== Species ==
There are two described species within the genus Paramelania and there may be more:

- Paramelania damoni (Smith, 1881) - type species, it is a species or an aggregate species
- Paramelania iridescens (Moore, 1898)

== Description ==
The type description of the genus Paramelania by Edgar Albert Smith (1881) reads as follows:

Shell solid, ovate-conical, imperforate, longitudinally ribbed and transversely lirate, covered with a thin epidermis. Aperture ovate, entire, indistinctly effuse at the base. Last whorl sometimes slightly prolonged inferiorly. Peristome thick, margins joined by a callosity. Operculum like that of Tiphobia.
