= Paludomus ajanensis =

Conservation status
- Endangered (IUCN 3.1)

Scientific classification
- Kingdom: Animalia
- Phylum: Mollusca
- Class: Gastropoda
- Subclass: Caenogastropoda
- Family: Paludomidae
- Genus: Paludomus
- Species: P. ajanensis

Binomial name
- Paludomus ajanensis Morelet, 1860

Synonyms
- Cleopatra ajanensis (Morelet, 1860)

Species of gastropod

Paludomus ajanensis is a species of tropical freshwater snail with an operculum, aquatic gastropod mollusc in the family Paludomidae. The natural habitat of this species is rivers. It is threatened by habitat loss.

This species lives in the Seychelles.
