= Syrnolopsis lacustris =

Conservation status
- Least Concern (IUCN 3.1)

Scientific classification
- Kingdom: Animalia
- Phylum: Mollusca
- Class: Gastropoda
- Subclass: Caenogastropoda
- Family: Paludomidae
- Genus: Syrnolopsis
- Species: S. lacustris

Binomial name
- Syrnolopsis lacustris E. A. Smith, 1880

Species of gastropod

Syrnolopsis lacustris is a species of medium-sized freshwater snail with an operculum, an aquatic gastropod mollusk in the family Paludomidae. This species is found in Lake Tanganyika, which includes the countries of Burundi, the Democratic Republic of the Congo, Tanzania, and Zambia. The natural habitat of this species is freshwater lakes.

Syrnolopsis lacustris is the type species of the genus Syrnolopsis.
