= Bridouxia praeclara =

Conservation status
- Near Threatened (IUCN 3.1)

Scientific classification
- Kingdom: Animalia
- Phylum: Mollusca
- Class: Gastropoda
- Subclass: Caenogastropoda
- Family: Paludomidae
- Genus: Bridouxia
- Species: B. praeclara

Binomial name
- Bridouxia praeclara (Bourguignat, 1885)

Synonyms
- Giraudia praeclara Bourguignat, 1885; Bridouxiana praeclara Bourguignat [orth. error]

Species of gastropod

Bridouxia praeclara is a species of tropical freshwater snail with a gill and an operculum, aquatic gastropod mollusk in the family Paludomidae.

This species is found in Burundi, Tanzania, and Zambia. Its natural habitat is freshwater lakes. It is threatened by habitat loss.
