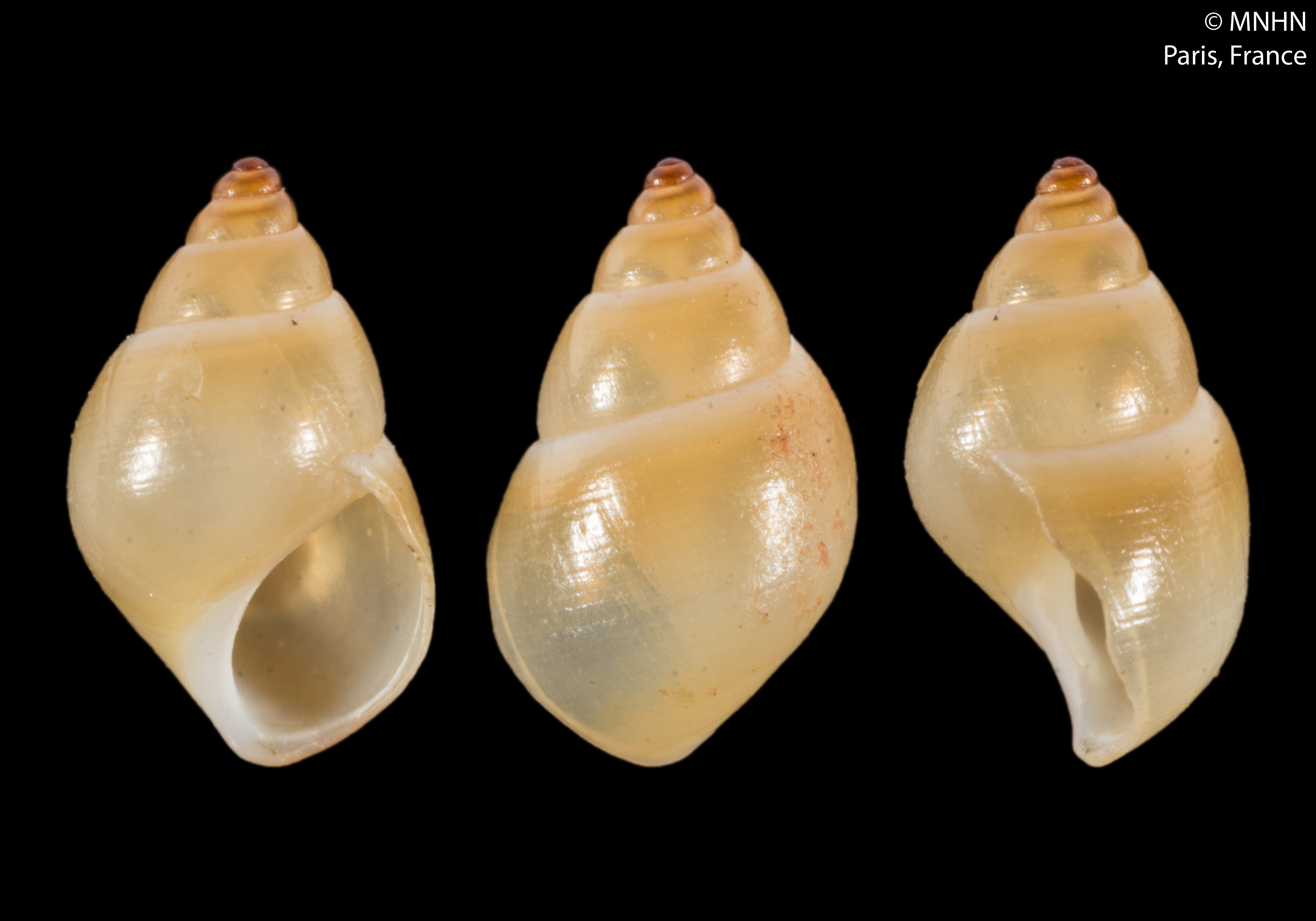
- Shell of Stanleya neritinoides

Scientific classification
- Kingdom: Animalia
- Phylum: Mollusca
- Class: Gastropoda
- Subclass: Caenogastropoda
- Order: incertae sedis
- Superfamily: Cerithioidea
- Family: Paludomidae
- Genus: Stanleya; Bourguignat, 1885

Synonyms
- Rumella Bourguignat, 1885 ·

= Stanleya (gastropod) =

Genus of gastropods

Stanleya is a genus of freshwater snails, aquatic gastropod molluscs in the family Paludomidae.

Rumella is the type genus of the tribe Rumellini.

== Species ==
Species in the genus Stanleya include:

- Stanleya neritinoides (E. A. Smith, 1880) (synonym: Rumella milneedwardsiana Bourguignat, 1885 )

Synonyms

- Stanleya giraudi: synonym of Stanleya neritinoides (E. A. Smith, 1880) (junior synonym)
- Stanleya rotundata E. A. Smith, 1904: synonym of Bridouxia rotundata (E. A. Smith, 1904) (original combination)
- Stanleya smithiana Bourguignat, 1885: synonym of Stanleya neritinoides (E. A. Smith, 1880) (junior synonym)
