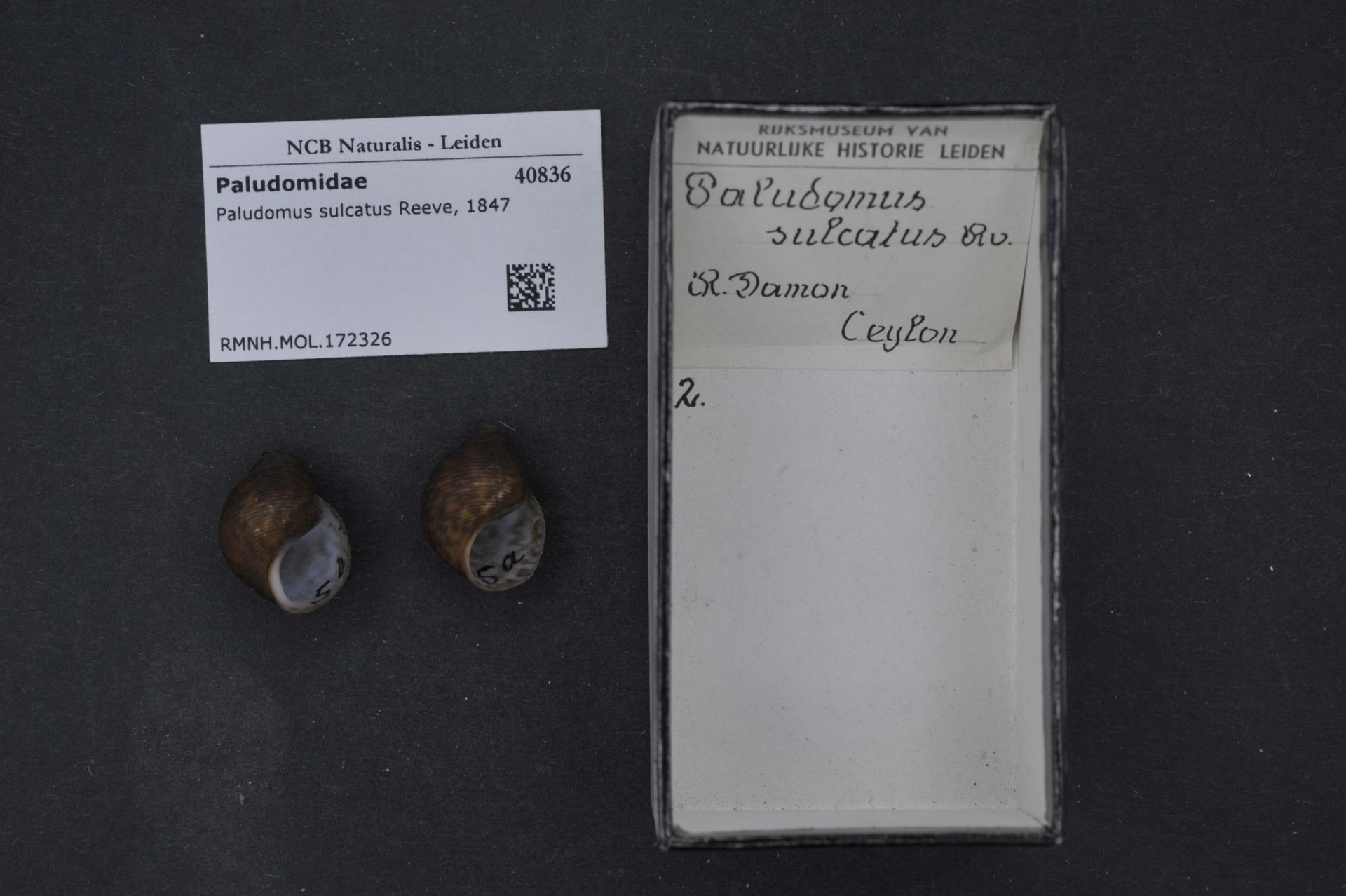
- Philopotamis sulcatus shells

Conservation status
- Data Deficient (IUCN 3.1)

Scientific classification
- Kingdom: Animalia
- Phylum: Mollusca
- Class: Gastropoda
- Subclass: Caenogastropoda
- Order: incertae sedis
- Family: Paludomidae
- Genus: Philopotamis
- Species: P. sulcatus

Binomial name
- Philopotamis sulcatus (Reeve, 1847)

Synonyms
- Paludomus sulcatus Reeve, 1847 (original combination); Paludomus travancorica W. T. Blanford, 1880 (a junior synonym)

= Philopotamis sulcatus =

Species of gastropod

Philopotamis sulcatus is a species of a freshwater snail with an operculum, aquatic gastropod mollusc in the family Paludomidae.

== Distribution ==
This species occurs in Sri Lanka.
