= Martelia =

Scientific classification
- Kingdom: Animalia
- Phylum: Mollusca
- Class: Gastropoda
- Subclass: Caenogastropoda
- Order: incertae sedis
- Family: Paludomidae
- Tribe: Syrnolopsini
- Genus: Martelia; Dautzenberg, 1908

Type species
- Martelia tanganyicensis Dautzenberg, 1908 - type species

Other species
- Martelia dautzenbergi Dupuis, 1924

Genus of gastropods

Martelia is a genus of tropical freshwater snails with an operculum, aquatic gastropod molluscs in the family Paludomidae.

Distribution of the genus Martelia includes the Lake Tanganyika only.
