= Pseudocleopatra broecki =

Conservation status
- Data Deficient (IUCN 3.1)

Scientific classification
- Kingdom: Animalia
- Phylum: Mollusca
- Class: Gastropoda
- Subclass: Caenogastropoda
- Order: incertae sedis
- Family: Paludomidae
- Genus: Pseudocleopatra
- Species: P. broecki

Binomial name
- Pseudocleopatra broecki (Putzeys, 1899)

Synonyms
- Cleopatra broecki Putzeys, 1899; Cleopatra broecki var. zonata Putzeys, 1899 (junior synonym); Potadomoides broecki (Putzeys, 1899); Pseudocleopatra bennikei Mandahl-Barth, 1974 (junior synonym)

Species of gastropod

Pseudocleopatra broecki is a species of freshwater snail with an operculum, an aquatic gastropod mollusc in the family Paludomidae.

This species is found in the Democratic Republic of the Congo.

Its natural habitat is rivers.
