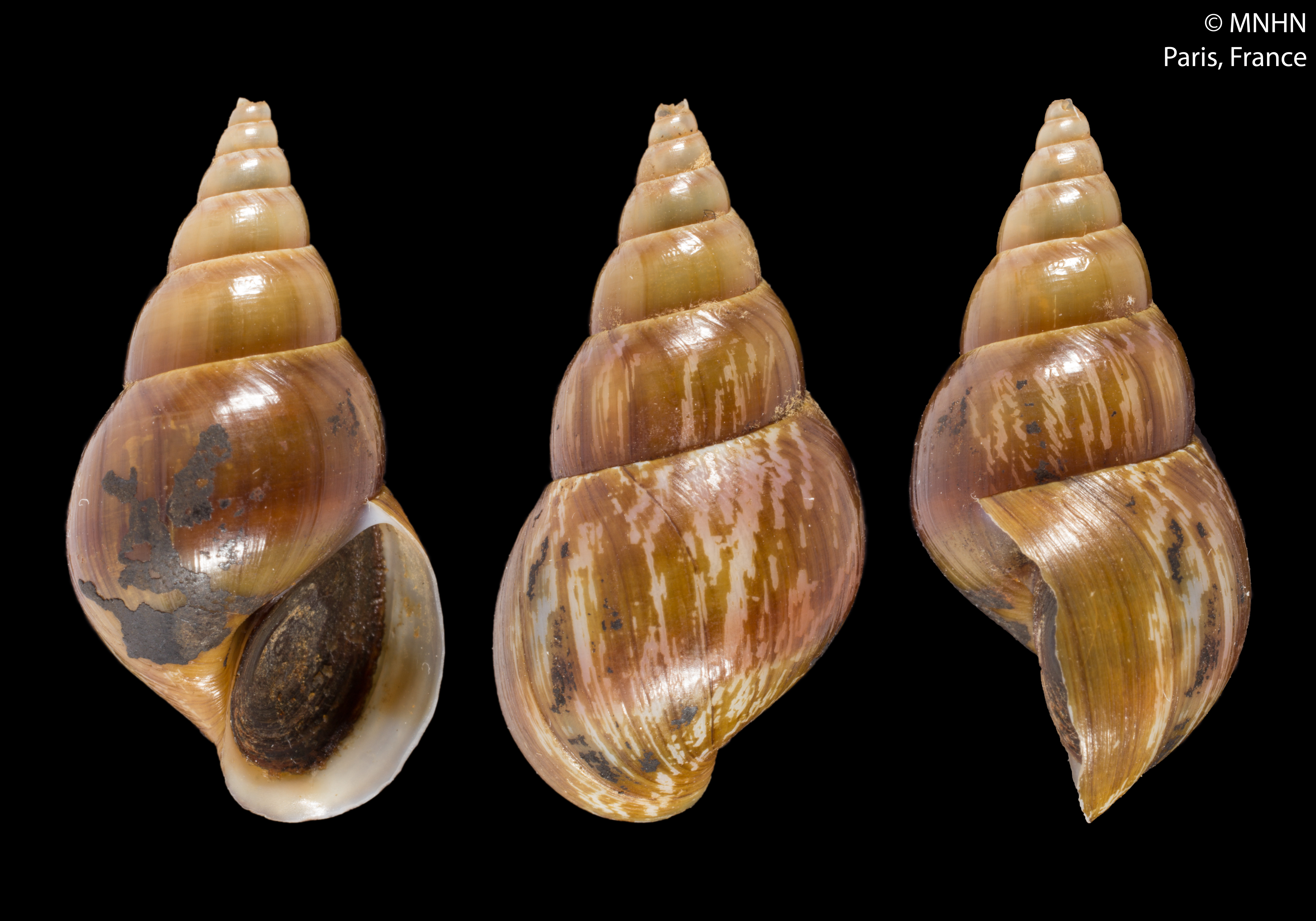
- Shell of Cleopatra ferruginea (syntype at MNHN, Paris)

Conservation status
- Least Concern (IUCN 3.1)

Scientific classification
- Kingdom: Animalia
- Phylum: Mollusca
- Class: Gastropoda
- Subclass: Caenogastropoda
- Order: incertae sedis
- Family: Paludomidae
- Genus: Cleopatra
- Species: C. ferruginea

Binomial name
- Cleopatra ferruginea (Lea & Lea, 1850)

Synonyms
- Cleopatra amaena (Morelet, 1851) (junior synonym); Cleopatra aurocincta E. von Martens, 1879; Cleopatra cameroni Bourguignat, 1879; Cleopatra dautzenbergi Pilsbry & Bequaert, 1927 (junior synonym); Cleopatra kynganica Bourguignat, 1879; Cleopatra letourneuxi Bourguignat, 1879; Melania amaena Morelet, 1851 (junior synonym); Melania ferruginea I. Lea & H. C. Lea, 1851 (original combination); Melania zanguebarensis Petit de la Saussaye, 1851; Paludomus ferrugineus (I. Lea & H. C. Lea, 1851) (superseded combination)

= Cleopatra ferruginea =

Species of gastropod

Cleopatra ferruginea is a species of freshwater snails with an operculum, aquatic gastropod molluscs in the family Paludomidae.

== Distribution ==
The holotype was found in Zanzibar.

This species is also found in Burundi, Egypt, Ethiopia, Kenya, Sudan, Tanzania, Uganda and South Africa.

Its natural habitats are intermittent rivers, swamps, and freshwater marshes.
