= Spekia =

Scientific classification
- Kingdom: Animalia
- Phylum: Mollusca
- Class: Gastropoda
- Subclass: Caenogastropoda
- Family: Paludomidae
- Genus: Spekia; Bourguignat, 1879

Diversity
- 2 species

Genus of gastropods

Spekia is a genus of freshwater snails, aquatic gastropod mollusks in the family Paludomidae.

Spekia is the type genus of the tribe Spekiini.

== Distribution ==
The genus Spekia is endemic to Lake Tanganyika.

== Species ==
For many years only one species was known in this genus, however, in 1999, a second species was described.

The genus Spekia contains the following species:

- Spekia coheni West, 1999
- Spekia zonata (Woodward, 1859)
