= Pseudocleopatra =

Scientific classification
- Kingdom: Animalia
- Phylum: Mollusca
- Class: Gastropoda
- Subclass: Caenogastropoda
- Order: incertae sedis
- Family: Paludomidae
- Subfamily: Cleopatrinae
- Genus: Pseudocleopatra; Thiele, 1928

Type species
- Pseudocleopatra togoensis Thiele, 1928

Genus of freshwater snails

Pseudocleopatra is a genus of freshwater snails in the family Paludomidae (subfamily Cleopatrinae).

== Species ==
As of 2020, four extant and seven extinct species are accepted in the genus Pseudocleopatra:

- Pseudocleopatra broecki (Putzeys, 1899)
- † Pseudocleopatra carinata Van Damme & Pickford, 2003
- Pseudocleopatra dartevellei Mandahl-Barth, 1973
- † Pseudocleopatra glaubrechti Van Damme & Pickford, 2003
- † Pseudocleopatra likeae Van Damme & Pickford, 2003
- † Pseudocleopatra musiimei Van Damme & Pickford, 2003
- † Pseudocleopatra rotunda Van Damme & Pickford, 2003
- Pseudocleopatra togoensis Thiele, 1928
- Pseudocleopatra voltana Mandahl-Barth, 1973
- † Pseudocleopatra wamalai Van Damme & Pickford, 2003
- † Pseudocleopatra wilsoni Van Damme & Pickford, 2003
