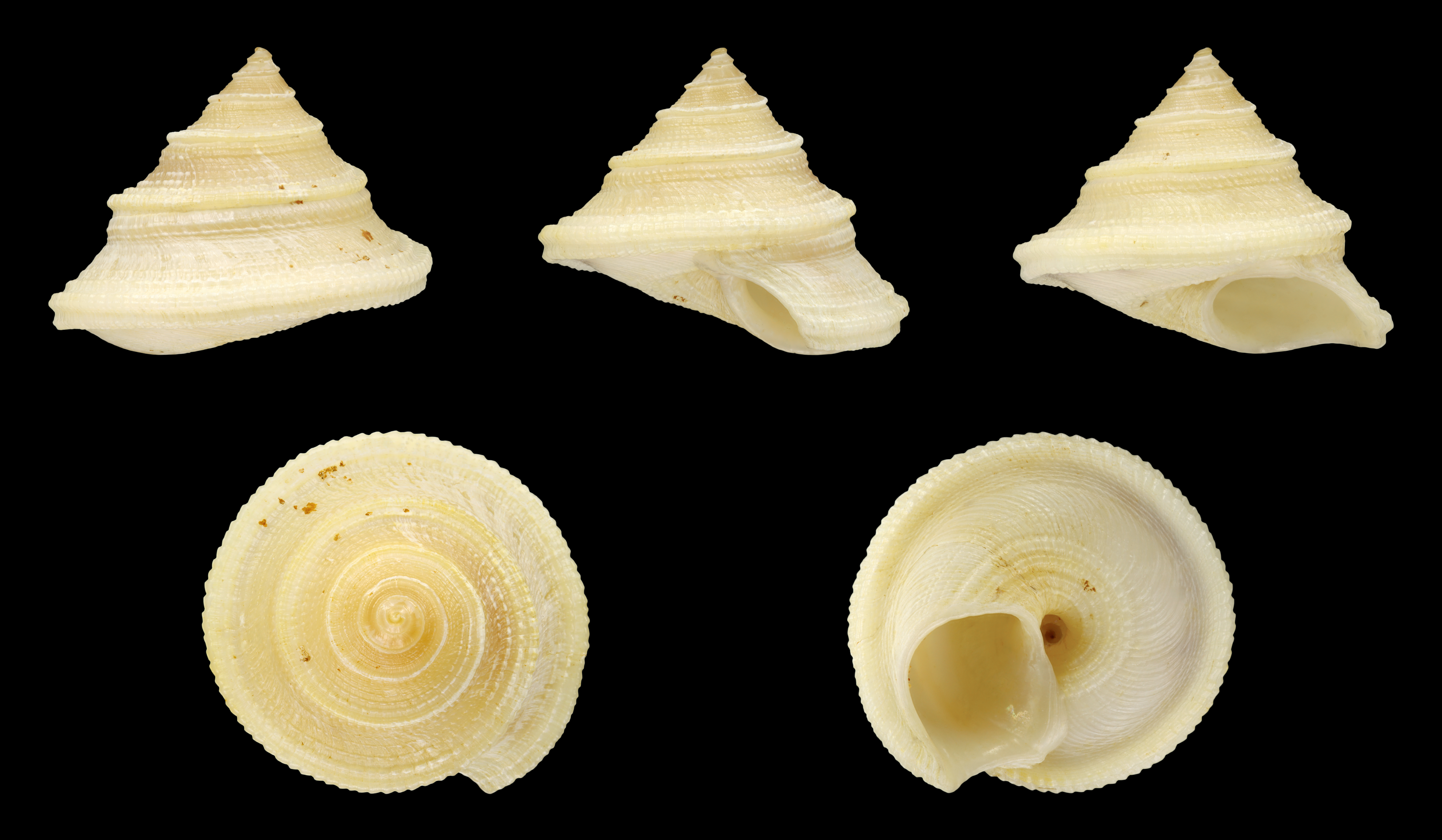

Conservation status
- Least Concern (IUCN 3.1)

Scientific classification
- Kingdom: Animalia
- Phylum: Mollusca
- Class: Gastropoda
- Subclass: Caenogastropoda
- Family: Paludomidae
- Subfamily: Hauttecoeuriinae
- Tribe: Tiphobiini
- Genus: Chytra; Moore, 1898
- Species: C. kirkii

Binomial name
- Chytra kirkii (E. A. Smith, 1880)

Synonyms
- Limnotrochus kirkii E. A. Smith, 1880

= Chytra kirkii =

Species of gastropod

Chytra kirkii is a species of tropical freshwater snail with an operculum, aquatic gastropod mollusk in the family Paludomidae.

Chytra kirkii is the only species in the genus Chytra.

The specific name kirkii is in honor of explorer John Kirk (1832-1922), who has donated various other specimen of snails (not this species) to the Natural History Museum.

== Distribution ==
This species is found in Burundi, the Democratic Republic of the Congo, Tanzania, and Zambia. The type locality is Lake Tanganyika.

== Description ==
The shell is solid, trochiform and dirty whitish in color. The spire is acutely conical. The shell has 6 or 7 feebly concave whorls. They are bearing arcuate and flexuous lines of growth and six or seven granulous lirae, whereof that immediately above the suture is the largest. The body whorl is acutely angular at the periphery, encircled by two subequal granular ridges. The base is concave near the circumference, then slightly convex, concentrically granosely ridged. The ridges nearest the umbilicus are coarser than the others, and also arcuately radiately striated. The shell has deep and narrow umbilicus.

The aperture is irregularly subcircular and whitish. The outer lip (viewed laterally) is obliquely incurved. Basal and columellar margins are forming one strongly arcuate line joined above to the extremity of the labrum by a thickish callosity.

The width of the shell is 19 mm. The height of the shell is 15 mm.

Black and white drawing of lateral view of the shell

Black and white drawing of umbilical view of the shell

== Ecology ==
Its natural habitat is freshwater lakes. It is widespread species in the Lake Tanganyika, but its distribution is patchy and with low numbers of snails. It lives on the mud with much organic material in depths 10–20 meters. There is possibility that it can live in depths up to 80 m.
