= Leloupiella =

Conservation status
- Least Concern (IUCN 3.1)

Scientific classification
- Kingdom: Animalia
- Phylum: Mollusca
- Class: Gastropoda
- Subclass: Caenogastropoda
- Order: incertae sedis
- Family: Paludomidae
- Genus: Leloupiella; Neiber & Glaubrecht, 2019
- Species: L. minima

Binomial name
- Leloupiella minima (E. A. Smith, 1908)

Synonyms
- Genus: Stormsia Leloup, 1953; Species: Baizea (Giraudia) minima (E. A. Smith, 1908); Giraudia minima E. A. Smith, 1908; Stormsia minima (E. A. Smith, 1908)

Genus of gastropods

Leloupiella minima is a species of freshwater snail, an aquatic gastropod mollusc in the family Paludomidae.

Leloupiella minima is the only species in the genus Leloupiella.

== Distribution ==
Leloupiella minima is found in Burundi, the Democratic Republic of the Congo, Tanzania, and Zambia.

Its natural habitat is freshwater lakes.
