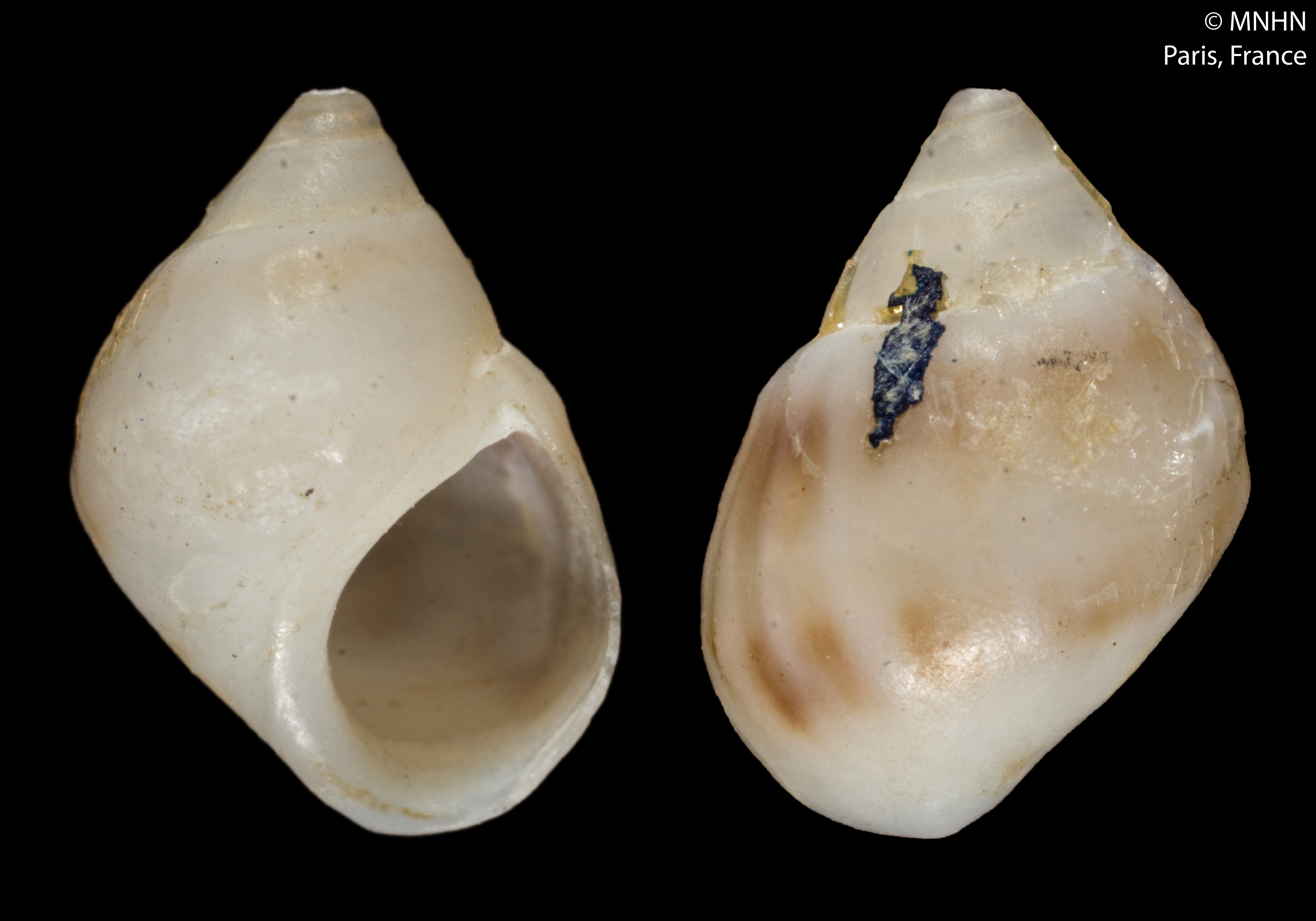
- Shell of Bridouxia giraudi (specimen at MNHN, Paris)

Scientific classification
- Kingdom: Animalia
- Phylum: Mollusca
- Class: Gastropoda
- Subclass: Caenogastropoda
- Superfamily: Cerithioidea
- Family: Paludomidae
- Genus: Bridouxia; Bourguignat, 1885

Type species
- Bridouxia giraudi Bourguignat, 1885

Synonyms
- Baizea Bourguignat, 1885; Coulboisia Bourguignat, 1888; Giraudia Bourguignat, 1885; Lechaptoisia Ancey, 1894

= Bridouxia =

Genus of gastropods

Bridouxia is a genus of small tropical freshwater snails with an operculum, aquatic gastropod mollusks in the family Paludomidae.

Species of this genus are endemic to the Lake Tanganyika.

== Species ==
Species within the genus Bridouxia include:

- Bridouxia giraudi Bourguignat, 1885 - type species
- Bridouxia leucoraphe (Ancey, 1890)
- Bridouxia ponsonbyi (Smith, 1889)
- Bridouxia praeclara (Bourguignat, 1885)
- Bridouxia rotundata (Smith, 1904)
- Bridouxia smithiana (Bourguignat, 1885)

Species brought into synonymy

- Bridouxia costata Bourguignat, 1885: synonym of Bridouxia giraudi Bourguignat, 1885
- Bridouxia reymondi Bourguignat, 1885: synonym of Bridouxia giraudi Bourguignat, 1885
- Bridouxia villeserriana Bourguignat, 1885: synonym of Bridouxia giraudi Bourguignat, 1885

== Ecology ==
They live on hard substrata in shallow water on shores of Lake Tanganyika.
