= Bridouxia rotundata =

Conservation status
- Least Concern (IUCN 3.1)

Scientific classification
- Kingdom: Animalia
- Phylum: Mollusca
- Class: Gastropoda
- Subclass: Caenogastropoda
- Family: Paludomidae
- Genus: Bridouxia
- Species: B. rotundata

Binomial name
- Bridouxia rotundata (E. A. Smith, 1904)

Synonyms
- Bridouxiana rotundata Smith [orth. error]; Stanleya rotundata Smith, 1904

Species of gastropod

Bridouxia rotundata is a species of tropical freshwater snail with a gill and an operculum, an aquatic gastropod mollusk in the family Paludomidae.

This species is found in Burundi, the Democratic Republic of the Congo, Tanzania, and Zambia. Its natural habitat is freshwater lakes.
