= Philopotamis =

Scientific classification
- Domain: Eukaryota
- Kingdom: Animalia
- Phylum: Mollusca
- Class: Gastropoda
- Subclass: Caenogastropoda
- Superfamily: Cerithioidea
- Family: Paludomidae
- Genus: Philopotamis; Layard, 1855

Type species
- Paludomus sulcatus Reeve, 1847

Synonyms
- Heteropoma Benson, 1856 (objective synonym); Paludomus (Philopotamis) Layard, 1855

Genus of gastropods

Philopotamis is a genus of tropical freshwater snails with an operculum, aquatic gastropod mollusks in thesubfamily Paludominae of the family Paludomidae.

== Species ==
- Philopotamis bicinctus (Reeve, 1854)
- Philopotamis clavatus (Reeve, 1854)
- Philopotamis decussatus (Reeve, 1854)
- Philopotamis globulosus (Gray in Griffith & Pidgeon, 1833)
- Philopotamis nigricans (Reeve, 1847)
- Philopotamis regalis (Layard, 1855)
- Philopotamis sulcatus (Reeve, 1847)
- Philopotamis violaceus (Layard, 1855

Taxon inquirendum

- Philopotamis thwaitesii Layard, 1855
