= Tanganyicia =

Scientific classification
- Kingdom: Animalia
- Phylum: Mollusca
- Class: Gastropoda
- Subclass: Caenogastropoda
- Order: incertae sedis
- Family: Paludomidae
- Genus: Tanganyicia; Crosse, 1881

Diversity
- 2 species

Synonyms
- Hauttecoeuria Bourguignat, 1885

Genus of gastropods

Tanganyicia is a genus of tropical freshwater snails with an operculum, aquatic gastropod mollusks in the family Paludomidae.

Before 2002 this genus was placed within the family Thiaridae.

== Species ==
Brown (1994) considered Tanganyicia rufofilosa a very variable species and the only species within the genus Tanganyicia. Later, in 1999, another species was described.

Species within the genus Tanganyicia include:

- Tanganyicia michelae (West, 1999)
- Tanganyicia rufofilosa (Smith, 1880) - type species
