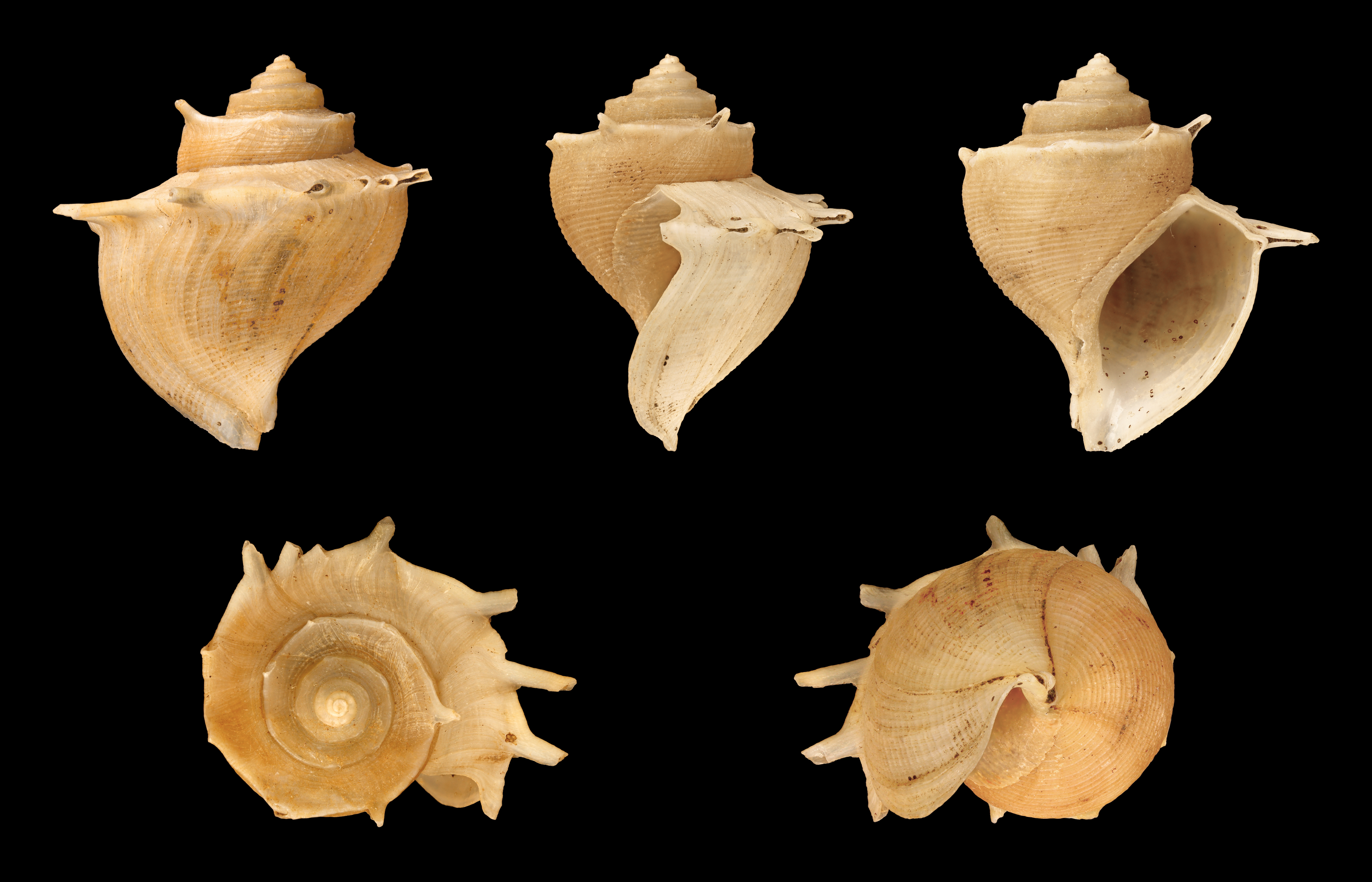
- Five views of a shell of Tiphobia horei

Conservation status
- Least Concern (IUCN 3.1)

Scientific classification
- Kingdom: Animalia
- Phylum: Mollusca
- Class: Gastropoda
- Subclass: Caenogastropoda
- Order: incertae sedis
- Family: Paludomidae
- Subfamily: Hauttecoeuriinae
- Tribe: Tiphobiini
- Genus: Tiphobia; E. A. Smith, 1880
- Species: T. horei

Binomial name
- Tiphobia horei E. A. Smith, 1880

Synonyms
- Melania horei E. A. Smith, 1880

= Tiphobia =

Species of gastropod

Tiphobia horei is a species of freshwater snail with an operculum, an aquatic gastropod mollusc in the family Paludomidae.

Tiphobia horei is the only species in the genus Tiphobia. Tiphobia is the type genus of the tribe Tiphobiini.

The specific name horei is in honor of Reverend Edward Coode Hore (1848-1912) from the UK.

== Distribution and habitat ==
Tiphobia horei is endemic to Lake Tanganyika. It is found in Burundi, the Democratic Republic of the Congo, Tanzania, and Zambia. The type locality is Lake Tanganyika at Ujiji.

It is typically found on muddy bottoms and often near river mouths. It ranges from the shoreline to a depth of about 150 m (490 ft) but tends to be more common in deeper waters.

== Description ==
Tiphobia horei has a large shell with spines, so it is easily to determine.

The width of the shell typically is 26 mm (1.0 in), and the height typically is 36 mm (1.4 in), but the latter can reach up to about 52 mm (2.0 in).

Tiphobia horei is ovoviviparous, there are typically almost 500 embryos per time and upon being "born" each young is up to about 1.5 mm (0.06 in) long. This snail feeds on detritus.

== Conservation status ==
This snail was given Endangered species status in 1996, but in 2006 this was revised to Least Concern, as it was found to be widespread within the lake and at least locally common. It is facing sedimentation, dredging and shell collecting, but these are considered to be minor threats to this species.

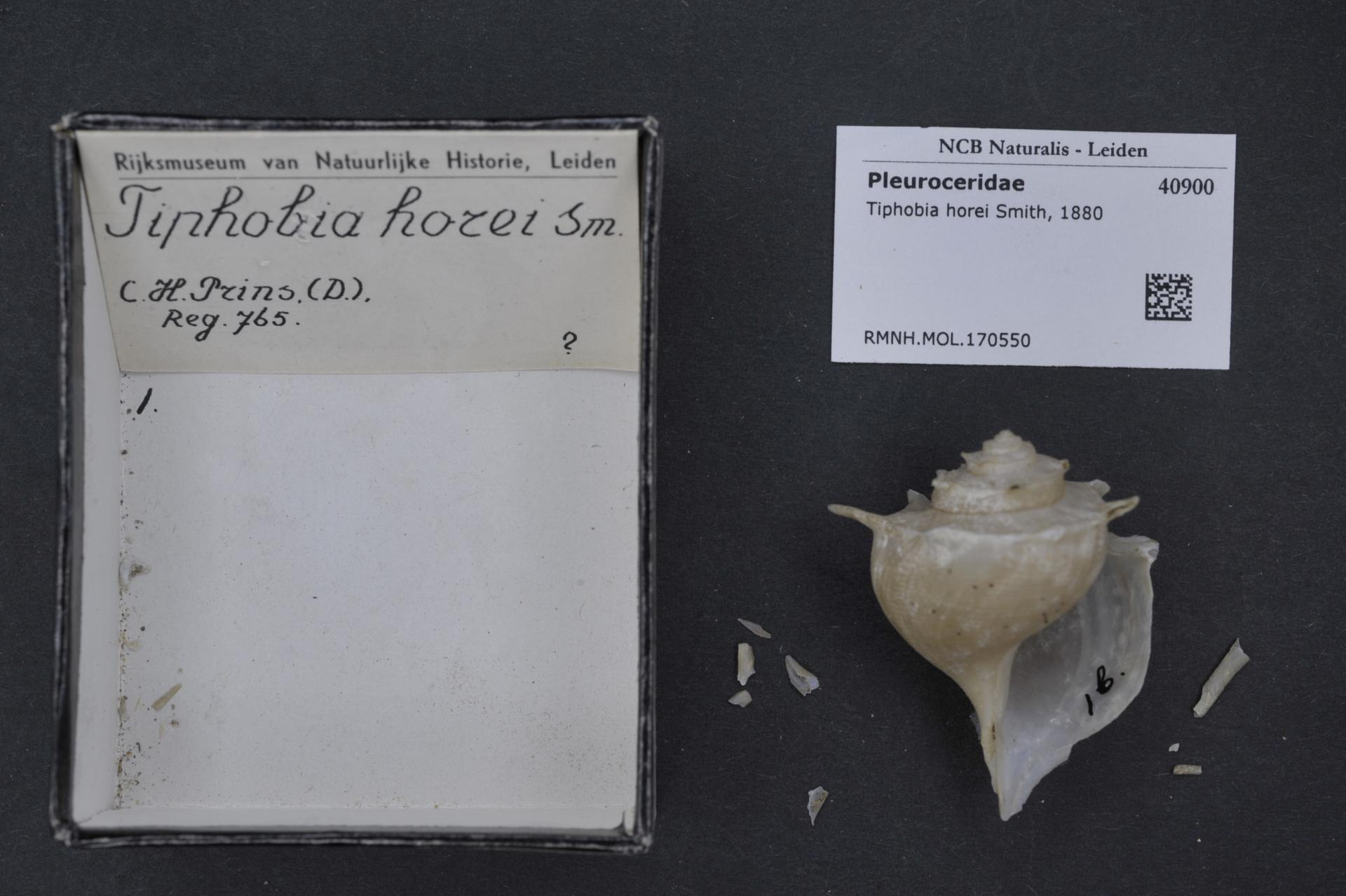
Tiphobia horei Smith, 1880. Museum specimen.

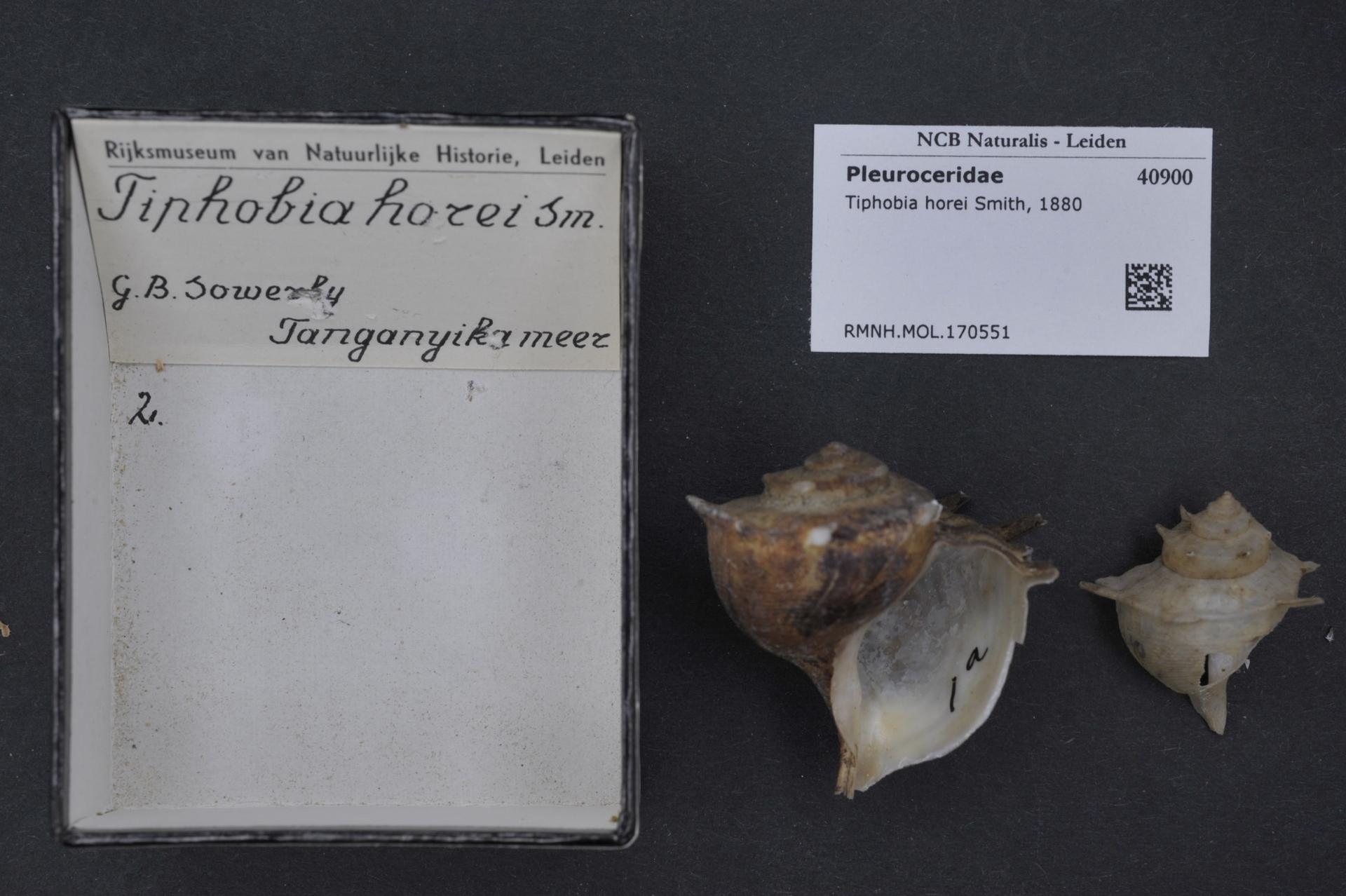
Tiphobia horei Smith, 1880. Museum specimens.
