= Syrnolopsis =

Scientific classification
- Kingdom: Animalia
- Phylum: Mollusca
- Class: Gastropoda
- Subclass: Caenogastropoda
- Order: incertae sedis
- Family: Paludomidae
- Genus: Syrnolopsis; E. A. Smith, 1880

Diversity
- 3 species

Genus of gastropods

Syrnolopsis is a genus of medium-sized freshwater snails with an operculum, aquatic gastropod mollusks in the family Paludomidae.

Syrnolopsis is the type genus of the tribe Syrnolopsini.

== Distribution ==
This genus is endemic to Lake Tanganyika, which includes the countries of Burundi, the Democratic Republic of the Congo, Tanzania, and Zambia.

== Species ==
Species in the genus Syrnolopsis include:

- Syrnolopsis gracilis Pilsbry & Bequaert, 1927
- Syrnolopsis lacustris E. A. Smith, 1880 - type species
- Syrnolopsis minuta Bourguignat, 1885

Synonyms

- Syrnolopsis anceyana Bourguignat, 1885: synonym of Syrnolopsis lacustris E. A. Smith, 1880 (junior synonym)
- Syrnolopsis carinifera E. A. Smith, 1889: synonym of Syrnolopsis minuta Bourguignat, 1885
- Syrnolopsis grandidieriana Bourguignat, 1885: synonym of Syrnolopsis lacustris E. A. Smith, 1880 (junior synonym)
- Syrnolopsis hamyana Bourguignat, 1885 : synonym of Syrnolopsis lacustris E. A. Smith, 1880 (junior synonym)
