= Jules René Bourguignat =

French malacologist

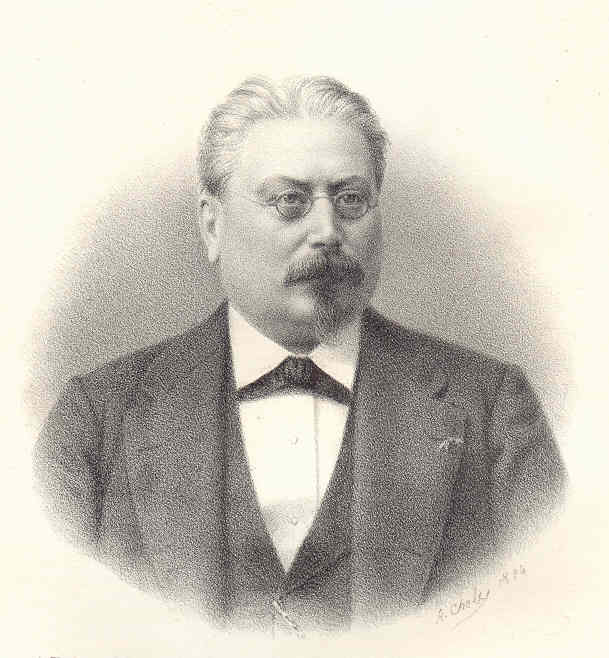
- Jules René Bourguignat.
- Born: 19 August 1829; Brienne-Napoléon, Aube, France
- Died: 7 April 1892 (aged 62); Vendeuvre-sur-Barse
- Scientific career
- Fields: malacology
- Author abbrev. (zoology): Bourgignat

Jules René Bourguignat (19 August 1829, Brienne-Napoléon, Aube – 7 April 1892) was a French malacologist, a scientist who studied mollusks. He served as secretary-general of the Société malacologique de France. He traveled widely, visiting, for example, Lake Tanganyika and North Africa. He reportedly defined 112 new genera and around 2540 new species of mollusks.

== Taxa ==
Bourguignat named and described many genera and species of mollusks, including:

- Aspatharia Bourguignat, 1885, a genus of freshwater mussel.
- Bridouxia Bourguignat, 1885, a genus of freshwater snail.
- Lanistes alexandri Bourguignat, 1850, a species of freshwater snail.
- Reymondia Bourguignat, 1885, a genus of freshwater snail.
- Spekia Bourguignat, 1879, a genus of freshwater snail.

== Bibliography ==
(partly in French)

- 1853–1880. Aménités malacologiques. Paris, 2 vol., 45 pl. regroupant 85 mémoires dans les domaines de la paléontologie, l'archéologie, la botanique et la malacologie.
- 1861–1862. Spicilèges malacologiques. Paris, 1 vol., 15 pl. regroupant 15 mémoires; ils font suite aux Aménités.
- 1876–1885. Species novissimae Molluscorum in europaeo systemati detectae, notis diagnosticis succinctis breviter descriptae. Paris.
- 1852. Testacea novissima quae Cl. de Saulcy, in itinere per Orientem, annis 1850 et 1851, collegit. Lutetiae.
- 1853. Catalogue raisonné des Mollusques terrestres et fluviatiles recueillis par M. F. de Saulcy, pendant son voyage en Orient. Paris, 4 pl.
- 1854. Monographie des espèces françaises du genre Sphaerium, suivie d'un catalogue synonymique des Sphéries constatées en France à l'état fossile. Bordeaux, 4 pl.
- 1860. Malacologie terrestre de l'île du Château d'If, près Marseille. Paris, 2 pl.
- (in French) Bourguignat J. R. 1860. Malacologie terrestre et fluviatile de la Bretagne. Paris, 2 pl.
- (in French) Bourguignat J. R. 1860. Methodus conchyliologicus denominationis.
- (in French) Bourguignat J. R. 1861. Étude synonymique sur les mollusques des Alpes maritimes publiés par A. Risso en 1826. Paris: J.B. Baillière. (at Internet Archive)
- 1862. Malacologie du Lac des Quatre-Cantons et de ses environs. Paris, 4 pl.
- (in French) Bourguignat J. R. 1862. Paleóntologie des mollusques terrestres et fluviales de l'Algeie. Paris.
- 1863. Monographie du nouveau genre français Moitessieria. Paris, 2 pl.
- (in French) Bourguignat J. R. 1863–1870. Mollusques nouveaux, litigieux ou peu connus. Paris, 2 vol., 49 pl. regroupant 12 décades; ils font suite aux Spicilèges.
  - 1863. Volume 1.
  - 1865. Volume ?
- 1864. Malacologie de Grande Chartreuse. Paris, 103 p., 17 pl.
- (in French) Bourguignat J. R. 1864. Malacologie d'Aix-les-Bains. Paris, 86 p., 3 pl.
- 1864. Malacologie de l'Algérie, ou Histoire naturelle des animaux Mollusques terrestres et fluviatiles recueillis jusqu'à ce jour dans nos possessions du nord de l'Afrique. Paris, 58 pl. et 5 cartes.
- 1865. Monographie du nouveau genre Paladilhia. Paris, 21 p., 1 pl.
- 1866. Recherches sur la distribution géographique des Mollusques terrestres et fluviatiles en Algérie et dans les régions circonvoisines. Ann. Sc. nat. Zool. V, Paris, 2 cartes.
- 1869. Catalogue des Mollusques terrestres et fluviatiles des environs de Paris, à l'époque quaternaire. Paris, 32 p., 3 pl.
- 1869. "Inscriptions romaines de Vence", Paris, Bibliotheca Regia Monacensis.
- 1876–1877. Histoire des Clausilies vivantes et fossiles de France. Ann. Sc. nat. Zool. (4–6). Paris.
- (in Latin) Bourguignat J. R. 1876. Species novissimae Molluscorum in Europaeo systemati detectae : notis diagnosticis succinctis breviter descriptae.
- 1877. Aperçu sur les espèces françaises du genre Succinea. Paris.
- (in French) Bourguignat J. R. 1880. Monographie du genre Emmericia. Angers: Lachèse et Dolbeau.
- 1880. Recensement des Vivipara du système européen. Paris.
- 1880–1881. Matériaux pour servir à l'histoire des Mollusques Acéphales du système européen. Poissy, 2 fascicules.
- (in French) Bourguignat J. R. 1883. Aperçu sur les Unionidae de la péninsule italique. Paris, Imprimerie de Jules Tremblay.
- 1883. Histoire malacologique de l'Abyssinie. Paris, 5 pl. et 1 carte.
- (in French) Bourguignat J. R. 1884. Histoire des mélaniens du système européen. Paris, Librairie des sciences naturelles, Paul Klincksieck.
- Bourguignat J. R. (1885). Notice prodromique sur les mollusques terrestres et fluviatiles recueillis par M. Victor Giraud dans la region méridionale du lac Tanganika. Paris. 110 pp.
