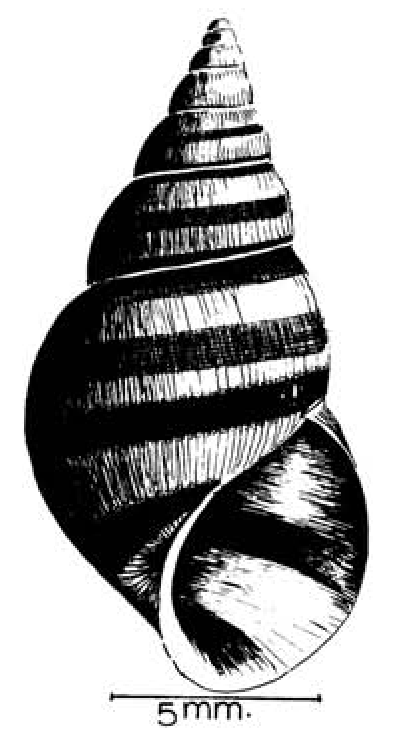
- Drawing of an apertural view of a shell of Cleopatra ferruginea

Scientific classification
- Kingdom: Animalia
- Phylum: Mollusca
- Class: Gastropoda
- Subclass: Caenogastropoda
- Order: incertae sedis
- Superfamily: Cerithioidea
- Family: Paludomidae; Stoliczka, 1868

Diversity
- about 100 freshwater species

Synonyms
- Lavigeriidae Thiele, 1925

= Paludomidae =

Family of gastropods

Paludomidae, common name paludomids, is a family of freshwater snails, gastropod molluscs in the clade Sorbeoconcha.

== Distribution ==
The distribution of the Paludomidae includes Asia and Africa.

== Taxonomy ==
The following three subfamilies have been recognized in the taxonomy of Bouchet & Rocroi (2005):

- Paludominae Stoliczka, 1868 - synonym: Philopotamidinae Stache, 1889
- Cleopatrinae Pilsbry & Bequaert, 1927
- Hauttecoeuriinae Bourguignat, 1885
  - tribe Hauttecoeuriini Bourguignat, 1885 - synonym: Tanganyiciinae Bandel, 1998
  - tribe Nassopsini Kesteven, 1903 - synonym: Lavigeriidae Thile, 1925
  - tribe Rumellini Ancey, 1906
  - tribe Spekiini Ancey, 1906 - synonyms: Giraudiidae Bourguignat, 1885 (inv.); Reymondiinae Bandel, 1998
  - tribe Syrnolopsini Bourguignat, 1890
  - tribe Tiphobiini Bourguignat, 1886 - synonyms: Hilacanthidae Bourguignat, 1890; Paramelaniidae J. E. S. Moore, 1898; Bathanaliidae Ancey, 1906; Limnotrochidae Ancey, 1906

A nomenclator of all Paludomidae was published in 2019.

== Genera ==
Genera within the family Paludomidae include:

Paludominae

- Ganga Layard, 1855
- Paludomus Swainson, 1840 - type genus of the family Paludomidae
- Philopotamis Layard, 1855

Cleopatrinae

- Cleopatra Troschel, 1857 - type genus of the subfamily Cleopatrinae
- Pseudocleopatra Thiele, 1928

Hauttecoeuriinae

tribe Hauttecoeuriini

- Tanganyicia Crosse, 1881 - synonym: Hauttecoeuria Bourguignat, 1885

tribe Nassopsini

- Lavigeria Bourguignat, 1888
- Potadomoides Leloup, 1953
- Vinundu Michel, 2004

tribe Rumellini

- Stanleya Bourguignat, 1885

tribe Spekiini

- Bridouxia Bourguignat, 1885
- Reymondia Bourguignat, 1885
- Spekia Bourguignat, 1879 - type genus of the tribe Spekiini

tribe Syrnolopsini

- Anceya Bourguignat, 1885
- Martelia Dautzenberg, 1908
- Syrnolopsis E. A. Smith, 1880 - type genus of the tribe Syrnolopsini

tribe Tiphobiini

- Bathanalia Moore, 1898
- Chytra Moore, 1898 - with the only species Chytra kirkii (E. A. Smith, 1880)
- Hirthia Ancey, 1898
- Limnotrochus Smith, 1880 - with the only species Limnotrochus thomsoni Smith, 1880
- Mysorelloides Leloup, 1953 - with the only species Mysorelloides multisulcata (Bourguignat, 1888)
- Paramelania Smith, 1881
- Tiphobia E. A. Smith, 1880 - type genus of the tribe Tiphobiini, with the only species Tiphobia horei E. A. Smith, 1880

== Synonyms ==
- Hemimitra Swainson, 1840: synonym of Paludomus Swainson, 1840 (junior synonym)
- Heteropoma Benson, 1856: synonym of Philopotamis Layard, 1855 (objective synonym)
- Odontochasma Tomlin, 1930: synonym of Paludomus (Odontochasma) Tomlin, 1930 represented as Paludomus Swainson, 1840
- Stomatodon Benson, 1862: synonym of Odontochasma Tomlin, 1930: synonym of Paludomus (Odontochasma) Tomlin, 1930 represented as Paludomus Swainson, 1840 (unavailable; a junior homonym of Stomatodon Seeley, 1861 [Gastropoda, Ringiculidae])
- Cambieria Bourguignat, 1885: synonym of Tanganyicia Crosse, 1881
- Hauttecoeuria Bourguignat, 1885: synonym of Tanganyicia Crosse, 1881
- Tanganikia Bourguignat, 1885: synonym of Tanganyicia Crosse, 1881
- Edgaria Bourguignat, 1888: synonym of Lavigeria Bourguignat, 1888
- Nassopsis E. A. Smith, 1890 - type genus of the tribe Nassopsini: synonym of Lavigeria Bourguignat, 1888
- Randabelia Bourguignat, 1888: synonym of Lavigeria Bourguignat, 1888
- Rumella Bourguignat, 1885 - type genus of the tribe Rumellini: synonym of Stanleya Bourguignat, 1885 (junior synonym)
- Baizea Bourguignat, 1885: synonym of Bridouxia Bourguignat, 1885
- Coulboisia Bourguignat, 1888: synonym of Bridouxia Bourguignat, 1885
- Giraudia Bourguignat, 1885: synonym of Bridouxia Bourguignat, 1885 (junior homonym of Giraudia Foerster, 1868 [Hymenoptera])
- Lechaptoisia Ancey, 1894: synonym of Bridouxia Bourguignat, 1885 (replacement name for Horea E. A. Smith, 1889 nec Bourguignat, 1888)
- Stormsia Bourguignat, 1891: synonym of Syrnolopsis E. A. Smith, 1880
- Burtonilla E. A. Smith, 1904: synonym of Anceya Bourguignat, 1885
- Bourguignatia Giraud, 1885: synonym of Paramelania E. A. Smith, 1881 (invalid: junior homonym of Bourguignatia Brusina, 1884)
- Bythoceras Moore, 1898: synonym of Paramelania E. A. Smith, 1881 (junior synonym)
- Hilacantha Ancey, 1886: synonym of Tiphobia E. A. Smith, 1880 (invalid: Unnecessary nom. nov. pro Tiphobia Smith, 1880
