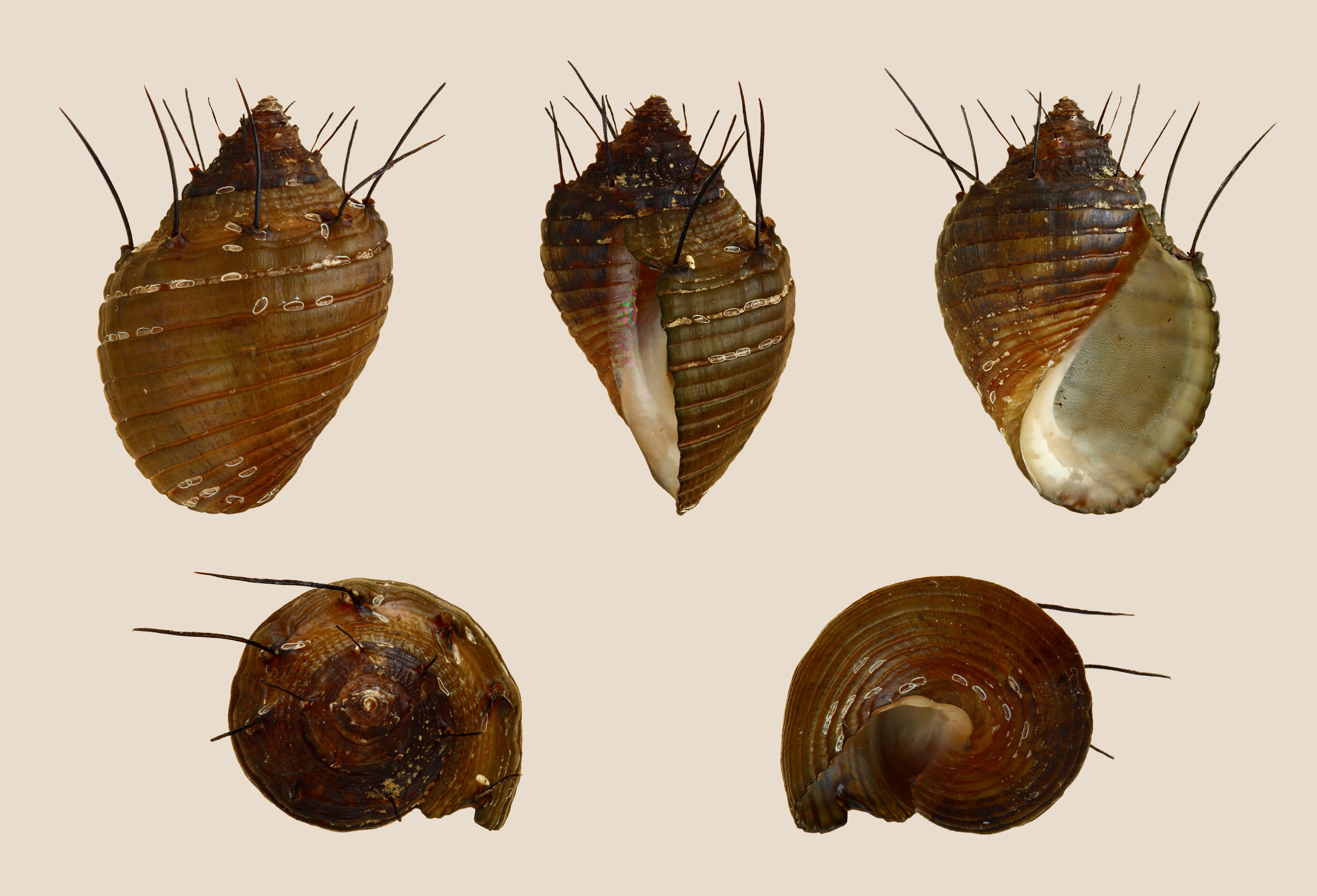
- Thiara cancellata shell

Scientific classification
- Kingdom: Animalia
- Phylum: Mollusca
- Class: Gastropoda
- Subclass: Caenogastropoda
- Order: incertae sedis
- Superfamily: Cerithioidea
- Family: Thiaridae
- Genus: Thiara; Röding, 1798

Type species
- Helix amarula Linnaeus, 1758

Synonyms
- Amarula (Linnaeus, 1758); Cerithomelania J. Moore, 1899 (objective synonym of Thiara); Doryssa (Melania) Lamarck, 1799; Melacantha Swainson, 1840 (objective synonym of Thiara); Melanea Lamarck, 1799 (incorrect subsequent spelling; junior objective synonym, with the same type species); Melania Lamarck, 1799; Melania (Tiaropsis) Brot, 1871 (invalid: junior homonym of Tiaropsis L. Agassiz, 1850 [Cnidaria]); Thiara Bolten, 1798

= Thiara =

Genus of gastropods

Thiara is a genus of freshwater snails, aquatic gastropod mollusks in the subfamily Thiarinae of the family Thiaridae.

== Species ==
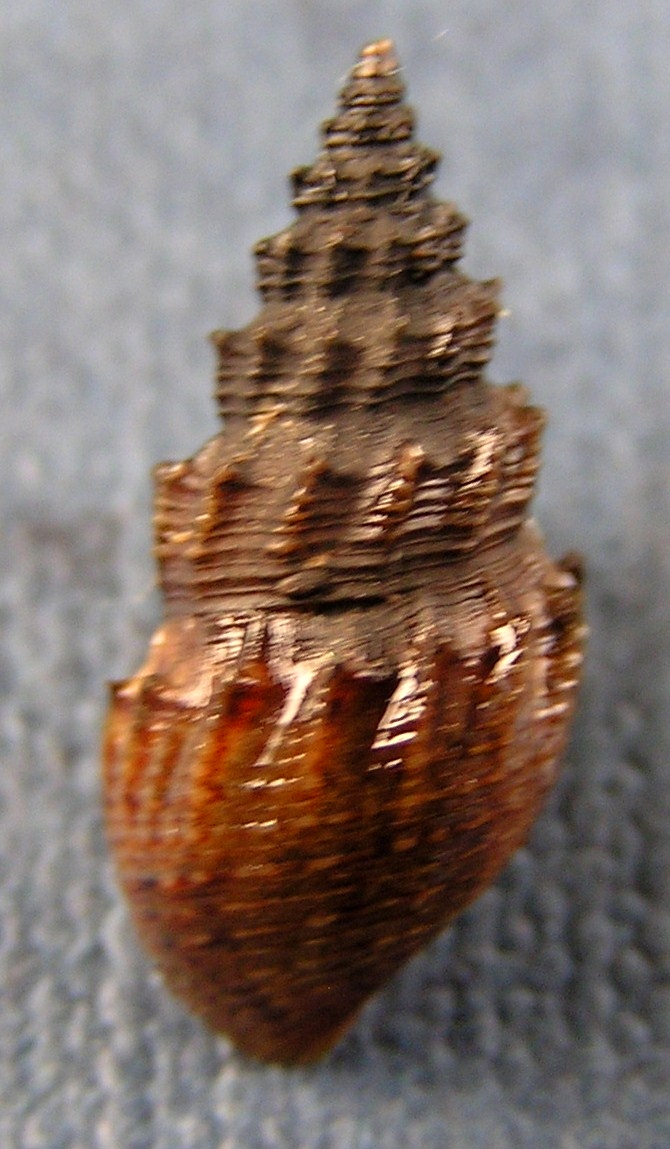
Thiara winteri, abapertural view

Species with accepted names within the genus Thiara include:

- † Thiara aldrichi Palmer, 1944
- Thiara amarula (C. Linnaeus, 1758) - Africa, Australia, India
- Thiara aspera (Lesson, 1831)
- Thiara australis (I. Lea & H. C. Lea, 1851)
- Thiara bellicosa (Hinds, 1844)
- Thiara cancellata P. F. Röding, 1798 - Indo-Pacific
- Thiara epidromoides (Tapparone Canefri, 1883)
- † Thiara fallax (Oostingh, 1935)
- Thiara herklotzi (Petit de la Saussaye, 1853)
- Thiara indefinita (I. & H. C. Lea, 1851) - Hawaiian Islands
- Thiara jingorum Thach & F. Huber, 2021
- Thiara kauaiensis (W. H. Pease, 1870) - Hawaiian Islands
- † Thiara martini (Oostingh, 1935)
- Thiara paludomoidea Nevill, 1884 - India (unresolved name)
- Thiara prashadi Ray, 1947 - India
- Thiara rudis I. Lea, 1850 - India
- † Thiara samarangana (K. Martin, 1884)
- Thiara setigera (Brot, 1870)
- Thiara verrauiana I. Lea, 1856 - Hawaiian Islands
- Thiara winteri (von Dem Busch, 1842) - Indo-Pacific, spiky trumpet snail

Synonyms

- Thiara amaruloidea Iredale, 1943: synonym of Thiara amarula (Linnaeus, 1758)
- Thiara balonnensis T. A. Conrad, 1850 and Thiara lirata C. T. Menke, 1843 are synonyms of Plotiopsis balonnensis (Conrad, 1850)
- Thiara baldwini C. F. Ancey, 1899 - Hawaiian Islands: synonym of Melanoides tuberculata (O. F. Müller, 1774) (junior synonym)
- † Thiara fiscina Yokoyama, 1932: synonym of † Semisulcospira fiscina (Yokoyama, 1932) (new combination)
- Thiara granifera (Lamarck, 1822): synonym of Tarebia granifera (Lamarck, 1816)
- Thiara lineata Gray, 1828 - India: synonym of Tarebia granifera (Lamarck, 1822)
- Thiara punctata (J. B. Lamarck, 1822) - India: synonym of Stenomelania punctata (Lamarck, 1822)
- Thiara riquetii (Grateloup, 1840): synonym of Sermyla riquetii (Grateloup, 1840)
- Thiara rodericensis (E. A. Smith, 1876): synonym of Melanoides tuberculata (O. F. Müller, 1774)
- Thiara scabra (O. F. Müller, 1774) - Indo-Pacific: synonym of Mieniplotia scabra (O. F. Müller, 1774)
  - Thiara scabra lyriformis I. Lea, 1850 - Japan
  - Thiara scabra pagoda I. Lea, 1850 - Japan
  - Thiara scabra subplicatula Smith, 1878 - Japan
- Thiara speciosa A. Adams, 1854: synonym of Thiara amarula (C. Linnaeus, 1758)
- Thiara torulosa (Bruguière, 1789) - India: synonym of Stenomelania torulosa (Bruguière, 1789)
- Thiara tuberculata (O. F. Müller, 1774): synonym of Melanoides tuberculata (O. F. Müller, 1774)
- Thiara vouamica Bourguignat, 1890: synonym of Thiara amarula (Linnaeus, 1758) (junior synonym)
