= Melanoides truncatelliformis =

Conservation status
- Least Concern (IUCN 3.1)

Scientific classification
- Domain: Eukaryota
- Kingdom: Animalia
- Phylum: Mollusca
- Class: Gastropoda
- Subclass: Caenogastropoda
- Family: Thiaridae
- Genus: Melanoides
- Species: M. truncatelliformis

Binomial name
- Melanoides truncatelliformis (Bourguignat, 1885)

Synonyms
- Melanoides polymorpha

Species of gastropod

Melanoides truncatelliformis is a species of gastropod in the Thiaridae family. It is endemic to Lake Malawi. Its natural habitat is freshwater lakes.

The IUCN Red List of Threatened Species treats the species as a synonym of Melanoides polymorpha.
