= Melanoides pergracilis =

Conservation status
- Data Deficient (IUCN 3.1)

Scientific classification
- Domain: Eukaryota
- Kingdom: Animalia
- Phylum: Mollusca
- Class: Gastropoda
- Subclass: Caenogastropoda
- Family: Thiaridae
- Genus: Melanoides
- Species: M. pergracilis

Binomial name
- Melanoides pergracilis (Von Martens, 1897)

Synonyms
- Melanoides polymorpha

Species of gastropod

Melanoides pergracilis is a species of freshwater snail with a gill and an operculum, an aquatic gastropod mollusk in the family Thiaridae.

This species is endemic to Lake Malawi. Its natural habitat is freshwater lakes.

The IUCN Red List of Threatened Species treats the species as a synonym of Melanoides polymorpha
