= Melanoides pupiformis =

Conservation status
- Least Concern (IUCN 3.1)

Scientific classification
- Domain: Eukaryota
- Kingdom: Animalia
- Phylum: Mollusca
- Class: Gastropoda
- Subclass: Caenogastropoda
- Family: Thiaridae
- Genus: Melanoides
- Species: M. pupiformis

Binomial name
- Melanoides pupiformis (E. A. Smith, 1877)

Synonyms
- Melania pupiformis E. A. Smith, 1877 Melanoides polymorpha

Species of gastropod

Melanoides pupiformis is a species of freshwater snail, gastropod in the Thiaridae family. It is endemic to Lake Malawi. Its natural habitat is freshwater lakes. It is threatened by habitat loss.

The IUCN Red List of Threatened Species treats the species as a synonym of Melanoides polymorpha.
