= Melanoides turritispira =

Conservation status
- Least Concern (IUCN 3.1)

Scientific classification
- Domain: Eukaryota
- Kingdom: Animalia
- Phylum: Mollusca
- Class: Gastropoda
- Subclass: Caenogastropoda
- Family: Thiaridae
- Genus: Melanoides
- Species: M. turritispira

Binomial name
- Melanoides turritispira (E. A. Smith, 1877)

Synonyms
- Melania turritispira E. A. Smith, 1877; M. woodwardi (Smith, 1893); Melanoides polymorpha

Species of gastropod

Melanoides turritispira is a species of gastropod in the Thiaridae family. It is endemic to Lake Malawi. Its natural habitat is freshwater lakes. It is threatened by habitat loss.

Original description by Edgar Albert Smith from 1877 describes a juvenile snail.

The IUCN Red List of Threatened Species treats the species as a synonym of Melanoides polymorpha.
