= Sermyla =

Sermyla may refer to:

- Sermyla (gastropod), a genus of snail
- Sermyla (moth), a moth genus, later given replacement name Myserla Lamas, 2017
- Sermyla (beetle), a beetle genus, later given replacement name Sermylassa Reitter, 1912
- Sermyla an alternative spelling of an ancient town
