= Melanoides nyassana =

Conservation status
- Least Concern (IUCN 3.1)

Scientific classification
- Domain: Eukaryota
- Kingdom: Animalia
- Phylum: Mollusca
- Class: Gastropoda
- Subclass: Caenogastropoda
- Family: Thiaridae
- Genus: Melanoides
- Species: M. nyassana

Binomial name
- Melanoides nyassana (E. A. Smith, 1877)

Synonyms
- Melania nyassana E. A. Smith, 1877; Melanoides polymorpha

Species of gastropod

Melanoides nyassana is a species of freshwater snail with a gill and an operculum, an aquatic gastropod mollusc in the family Thiaridae.

It is endemic to Lake Malawi, where it is widespread.

Melania truncatelliformis Bourguignat, 1889 may be a synonym of Melanoides nyassana. The IUCN Red List of Threatened Species treats the species as a synonym of Melanoides polymorpha.
