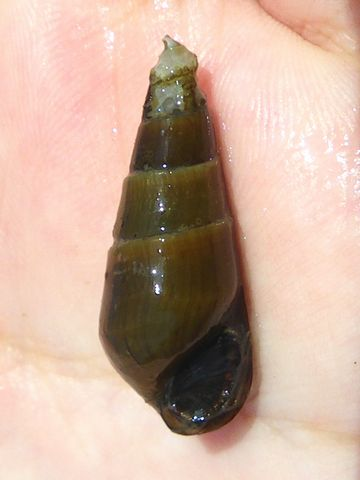
- A live but retracted individual of Stenomelania rufescens on a human hand

Scientific classification
- Kingdom: Animalia
- Phylum: Mollusca
- Class: Gastropoda
- Subclass: Caenogastropoda
- Order: incertae sedis
- Family: Thiaridae
- Genus: Stenomelania
- Species: S. crenulata

Binomial name
- Stenomelania crenulata (Deshayes, 1838)

Synonyms
- Melania crenulata Deshayes, 1838; Melania rufescens Martens, 1860; Stenomelania rufescens (Martens, 1860)

= Stenomelania crenulata =

Species of gastropod

Stenomelania crenulata is a species of brackish and freshwater snail, an aquatic gastropod mollusk in the family Thiaridae.

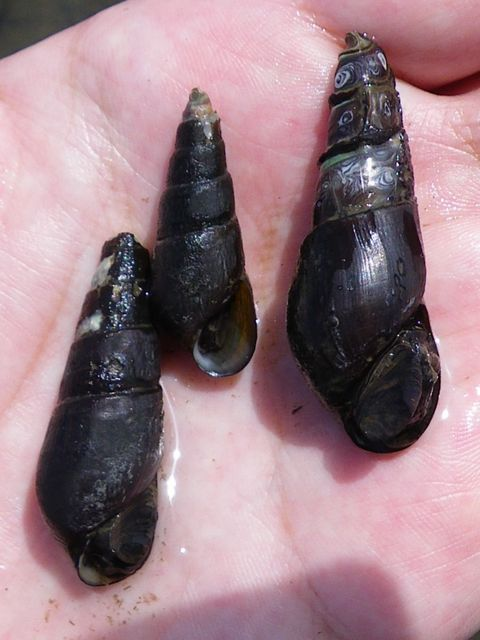
Three live individuals of Stenomelania crenulata on a human hand

== Distribution ==
This is considered to be a vulnerable species (VU) in Japan.
