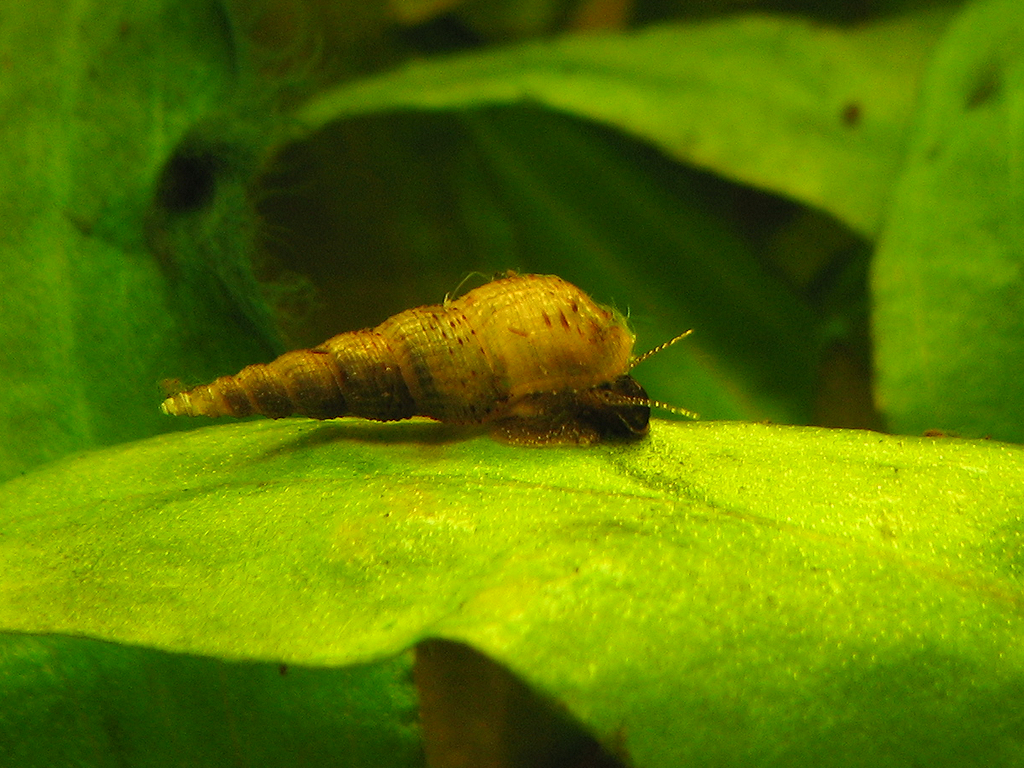
- live Melanoides tuberculata
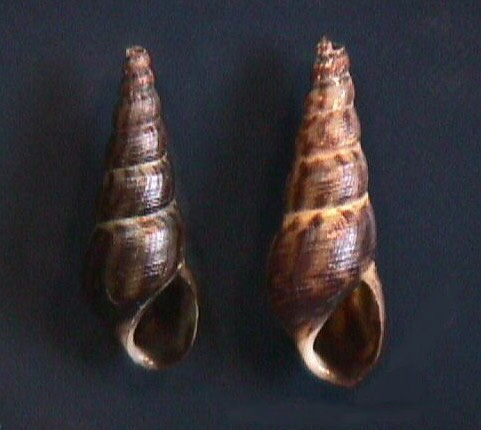
- Apertural view of two shells of Melanoides tuberculata

Scientific classification
- Domain: Eukaryota
- Kingdom: Animalia
- Phylum: Mollusca
- Class: Gastropoda
- Subclass: Caenogastropoda
- Superfamily: Cerithioidea
- Family: Thiaridae
- Subfamily: Thiarinae
- Genus: Melanoides; Olivier, 1804

Type species
- Melanoides fasciolata Olivier, 1804

Diversity
- about 30 species (in Africa)

Synonyms
- Eumelania Rovereto, 1899 (invalid: unnecessary nom. nov....); Faunus (Pirenopsis) Brot, 1879; Horea Bourguignat, 1888; Melania (Eumelania) Rovereto, 1899 (invalid: unnecessary nom. nov. pro Striatella Brot, 1870, by Rovereto treated as a junior homonym of Striatella Agardh, 1832, which is a diatom and thus does not compete in homonymy); Melania (Melanoides) Olivier, 1804; Melania (Nyassella) Bourguignat, 1889; Melania (Nyassia) Bourguignat, 1889; Melania (Striatella) Brot, 1870 (junior synonym); † Melanoides (Jacquotia) Roman, 1912 · alternate representation; Melanoides (Melanoides) Olivier, 1804; Micronyassia Bourguignat, 1889; Nyassella Bourguignat, 1889; Nyassia Bourguignat, 1889; Nyassomelania Bourguignat, 1889; Pallarya Hesse, 1916 (invalid: unnecessary nom. nov. pro Striatella Brot, 1870, by Hesse treated as a junior homonym of Striatella Agardh, 1832, which is a diatom, and thus does not compete in homonymy); Pirenopsis Brot, 1879; Striatella Brot, 1870 (invalid: objective junior synonym); Thiara (Melanoides) Olivier, 1804 (subgenus rank not accepted)

= Melanoides =

Genus of gastropods

Melanoides is a genus of freshwater snails in the family Thiaridae. They are aquatic gastropod mollusks with an operculum.

== Species ==
Species within the genus Melanoides include:

- Melanoides admirabilis (Smith, 1880)
- Melanoides agglutinans (Bequaert & Clench, 1941)
- Melanoides angolensis Mandahl-Barth, 1974
- Melanoides anomala (Dautzenberg & Germain, 1914)
- † Melanoides apirospira (Fontannes, 1884)
- † Melanoides apscheronica (Andrusov, 1923)
- † Melanoides aspera Youluo, 1978
- † Melanoides aspericostata Y.-T. Li, 1987
- Melanoides bavayi (Dautzenberg & Germain, 1914)
- † Melanoides castrepiscopalensis (Almera, 1894)
- † Melanoides catalaunica (Almera & Bofill y Poch, 1895)
- † Melanoides conica Macaleț, 2002
- Melanoides crawshayi (Smith, 1893)
- † Melanoides cretaceus Yen, 1966
- † Melanoides curvicosta (Deshayes in Geoffroy Saint-Hilaire et al., 1832)
- Melanoides depravata (Dupuis & Putzeys, 1900)
- † Melanoides devestita Stache, 1889
- † Melanoides diestopleura (Fontannes, 1884)
- Melanoides dupuisi (Spence, 1923)
- Melanoides elisabethkernae Thach & F. Huber, 2021
- Melanoides enomotoi Pilsbry, 1924
- † Melanoides ettingshauseni (Dainelli, 1901)
- Melanoides fasciata (J. Sowerby, 1819)
- † Melanoides falcicostata (Hofmann, 1870)
- Melanoides fasciolata Olivier, 1804: synonym of Melanoides tuberculata (O. F. Müller, 1774)
- † Melanoides fettkei (Weaver, 1912)
- † Melanoides floristriata Youluo, 1978
- † Melanoides florivaricosa Youluo, 1978
- † Melanoides furuhjelmi (C. Mayer, 1869)
- † Melanoides gilletae Rey, 1974
- † Melanoides glypta Youluo, 1978
- † Melanoides heberti (Hermite, 1879) (temporary name, junior primary homonym of M. heberti Hantken, 1878; no replacement name or synonym available)
- Melanoides hoekzemai van Benthem Jutting, 1963
- † Melanoides jeanteti Rey, 1967
- Melanoides jugicostis (Hanley & Theobald, 1876)
- † Melanoides juliani (Roman, 1912)
- †Melanoides kainarensis Starobogatov & Izzatullaev, 1980
- Melanoides kisangani Pilsbry & Bequaert, 1927
- Melanoides kinshassaensis (Dupuis & Putzeys, 1900)
- Melanoides lamberti (Crosse, 1869)
- Melanoides langi Pilsbry & Bequaert, 1927
- Melanoides laxa (Mousson, 1869)
- Melanoides liebrechtsi (Dautzenberg, 1901)
- † Melanoides lusitanica (Roman, 1907)
- † Melanoides macra Y.-T. Li, 1987
- Melanoides magnifica (Bourguignat, 1889)
- Melanoides manguensis (Thiele, 1928)
- † Melanoides martinsoni Zharnyl'skaya, 1965
- Melanoides mweruensis (Smith, 1893)
- Melanoides nodicincta (Dohrn, 1865)
- Melanoides nsendweensis (Dupuis & Putzeys, 1900)
- Melanoides nyangweensis (Dupuis & Putzeys, 1900)
- Melanoides nyassana (Smith, 1877)
- † Melanoides otatumei Suzuki, 1944
- † Melanoides pachecoi (Vidal, 1917)
- † Melanoides pamirica Lindholm, 1930
- † Melanoides pectinicostata Youluo, 1978
- † Melanoides peregrina (Mousson, 1869)
- Melanoides pergracilis (Martens, 1897)
- Melanoides polymorpha (Smith, 1877)
- † Melanoides procurvirostra Kókay, 2006
- Melanoides psorica (Morelet, 1864)
- Melanoides pupiformis (Smith, 1877)
- Melanoides recticosta (Martens, 1882)
- † Melanoides rwebishengoensis Van Damme & Pickford, 2003
- † Melanoides sepulchralis (Fontannes, 1884)
- Melanoides shahdaraensis Starobogatov & Izzatullaev, 1980
- † Melanoides solitaria Stache, 1889
- † Melanoides sphecodes (Fontannes, 1884)
- † Melanoides striata Y.-T. Li, 1987
- Melanoides swinhoei A. Adams, 1870
- † Melanoides tourainei Rey, 1974
- † Melanoides tournoueri (Fuchs, 1877)
- Melanoides truncatelliformis (Bourguignat, 1885)
- Melanoides tuberculata (O. F. Müller, 1774) - Red-rimmed melania
- † Melanoides tudorae Stache, 1889
- † Melanoides tuozhuangensis Youluo, 1978
- Melanoides turriculus (I. Lea, 1850) - fawn melania
- Melanoides turritispira (Smith, 1877)
- † Melanoides umbraculiformis Youluo, 1978
- † Melanoides vandenbosschei Van Damme & Pickford, 2003
- † Melanoides verniersi Van Damme & Pickford, 2003
- Melanoides victoriae (Dohrn, 1865)
- † Melanoides vidali (Cossmann, 1898)
- Melanoides voltae (Thiele, 1928)
- Melanoides wagenia Pilsbry & Bequaert, 1927
- † Melanoides winkleri (Mayer, 1861)
- † Melanoides wollebeni Perrilliat & Vega in Perrilliat et al., 2008
- † Melanoides yolandae Perrilliat & Vega in Perrilliat et al., 2008

Species brought into synonymy

- Melanoides abchasica (Seninski, 1905): synonym of † Tinnyea abchasica (Seninski, 1905)
- Melanoides conicus Macaleț, 2002: synonym of † Melanoides conica Macaleț, 2002
- Melanoides riqueti (Grateloup, 1840): synonym of Sermyla riqueti (Grateloup, 1840)
