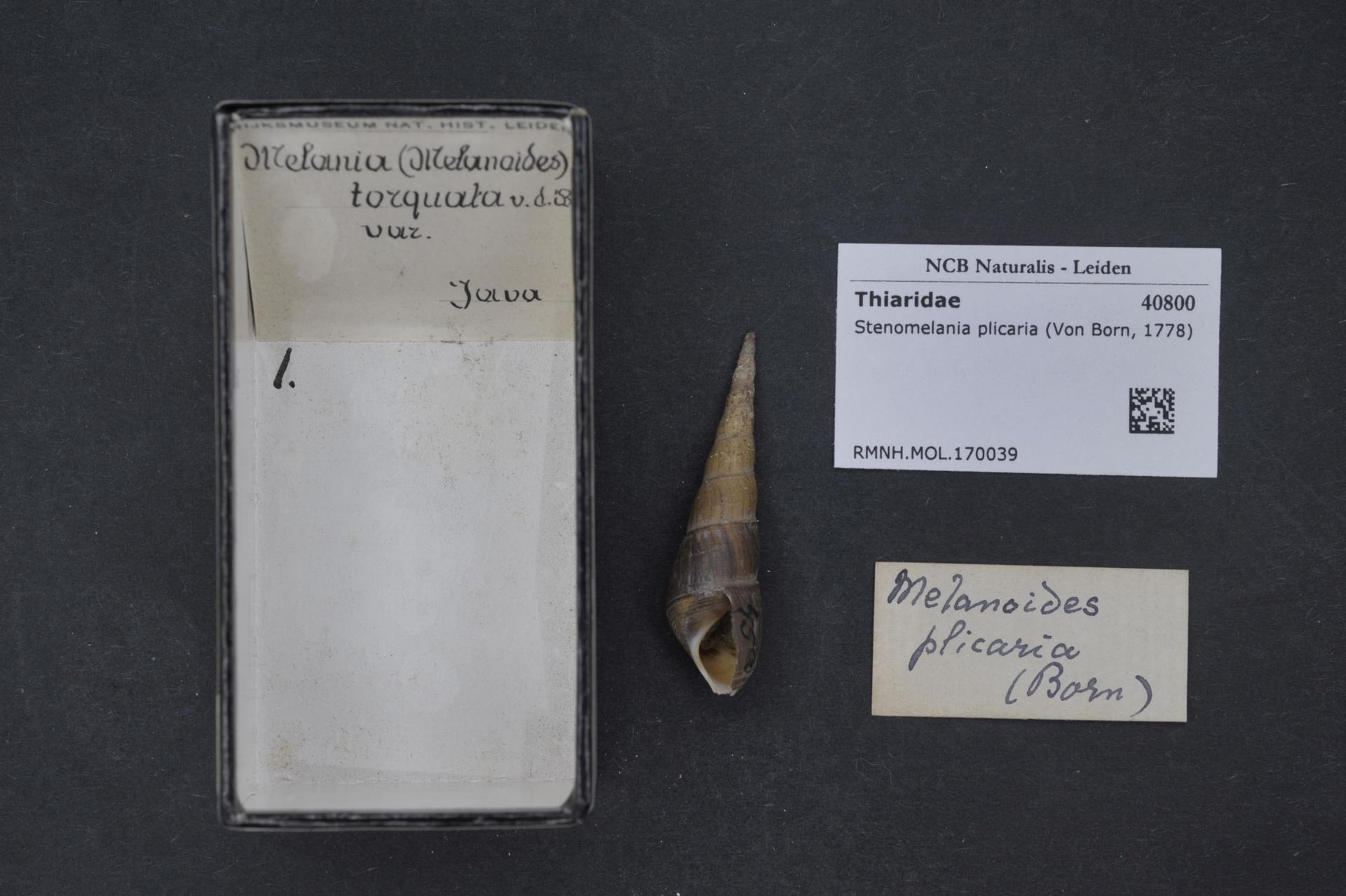

Scientific classification
- Kingdom: Animalia
- Phylum: Mollusca
- Class: Gastropoda
- Subclass: Caenogastropoda
- Order: incertae sedis
- Family: Thiaridae
- Genus: Stenomelania
- Species: S. plicaria

Binomial name
- Stenomelania plicaria von Born, 1778

= Stenomelania plicaria =

Species of snail

Stenomelania plicaria, commonly known as the chopstick snail or the yellow chopstick snail, is a species of trumpet snail, first described by I. von Born under the synonymized name Helix pilcaria (Index rerum naturalium Musei Cæsarei Vindobonensis (pg. 403)).

== Description ==
S. plicaria maximum growth size has not been well studied. The Encyclopedia of Life states a maximum size of 2.4 in (61 mm), though this number is known to vary among different sources. S. plicaria contains both a gill and an operculum, as well as a long, pointed dextrally coiled turreted shell, fading from brown to light grey.

== Distribution ==
Range of S. plicaria has not been described, though multiple sightings have been reported in the Southeast Asian and South Pacific regions.

== Life cycle ==
S. plicaria is a gonochoric, broadcast spawner, beginning life as embryos, developing into planktonic trocophore larvae, later juvenile veligers, and finally adults. Embryos, larvae, and veligers are unable to survive under freshwater conditions.

== Synonymized names ==
This species has several synonyms:

- Helix "plicata" (misspelled for plicaria)
- Helix plicaria
- Melania (Stenomelania) plicaria
- Melania (Stenomelania) plicaria var. cincta
- Melania acuta
- Melania anthracinca
- Melania arroensis
- Melania blossevilliana
- Melania cacuminata
- Melania corrugata
- Melania flammulata
- Melania fumosa
- Melania funiculus
- Melania hastula
- Melania offachiensis
- Melania scutulata
- Melania subulata
- Melanoides (Stenomelania) funiculus
- Melanoides (Stenomelania) plicaria
- Melanoides funiculus
- Melanoides hastula
- Melanoides plicaria
- Melanoides plicarius
- Stenomelania funiculus
