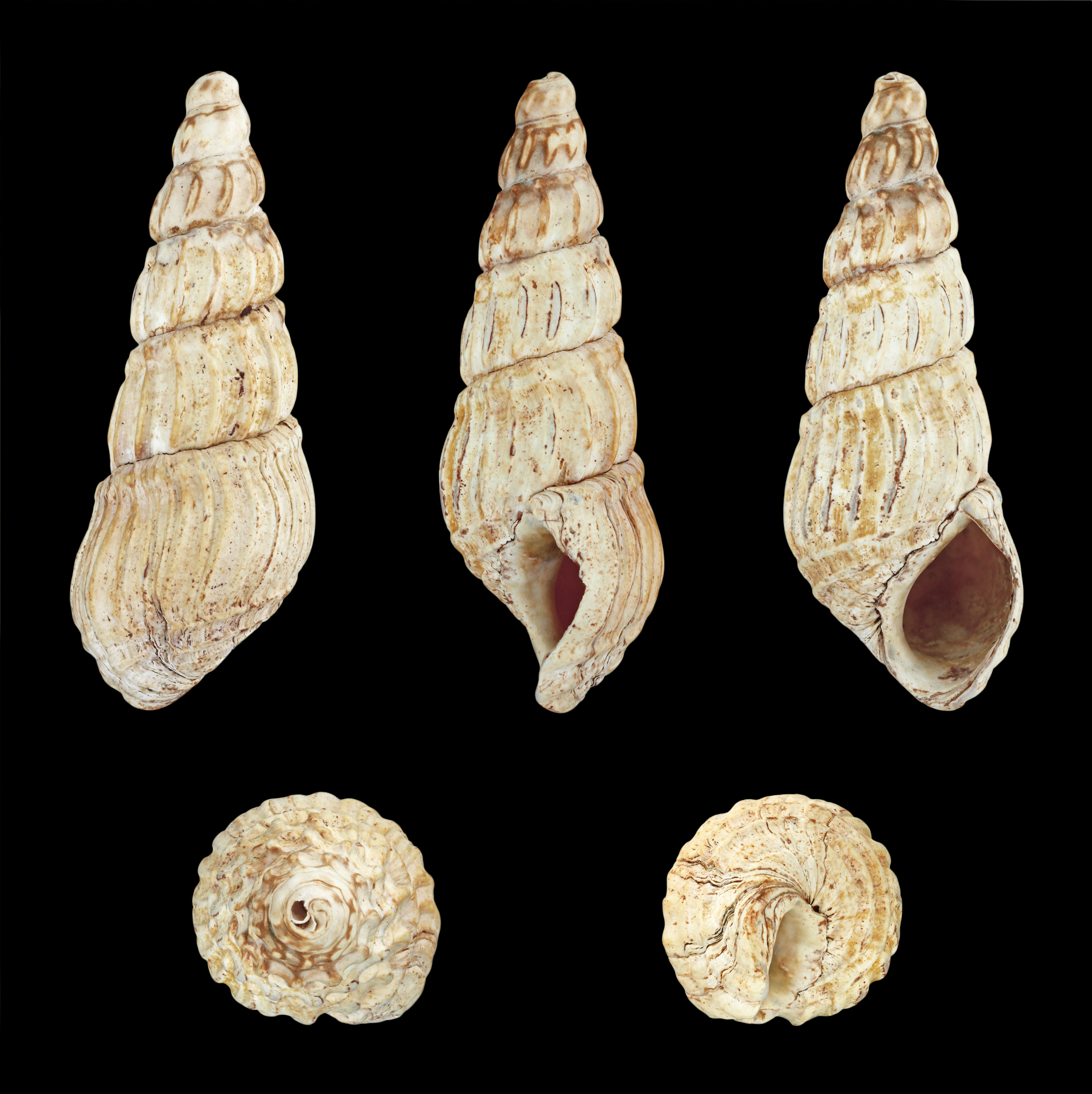

Conservation status
- Near Threatened (IUCN 3.1)

Scientific classification
- Kingdom: Animalia
- Phylum: Mollusca
- Class: Gastropoda
- Subclass: Caenogastropoda
- Family: Thiaridae
- Genus: Melanoides
- Species: M. admirabilis

Binomial name
- Melanoides admirabilis (E. A. Smith, 1880)

Synonyms
- Melania (Sermyla) admirabilis Smith, 1880

= Melanoides admirabilis =

Species of gastropod

Melanoides admirabilis is a species of freshwater snail with a gill and an operculum, an aquatic gastropod mollusk in the family Thiaridae.

This species is found in the Democratic Republic of the Congo, Tanzania, and Zambia. Its natural habitat is freshwater lakes.
