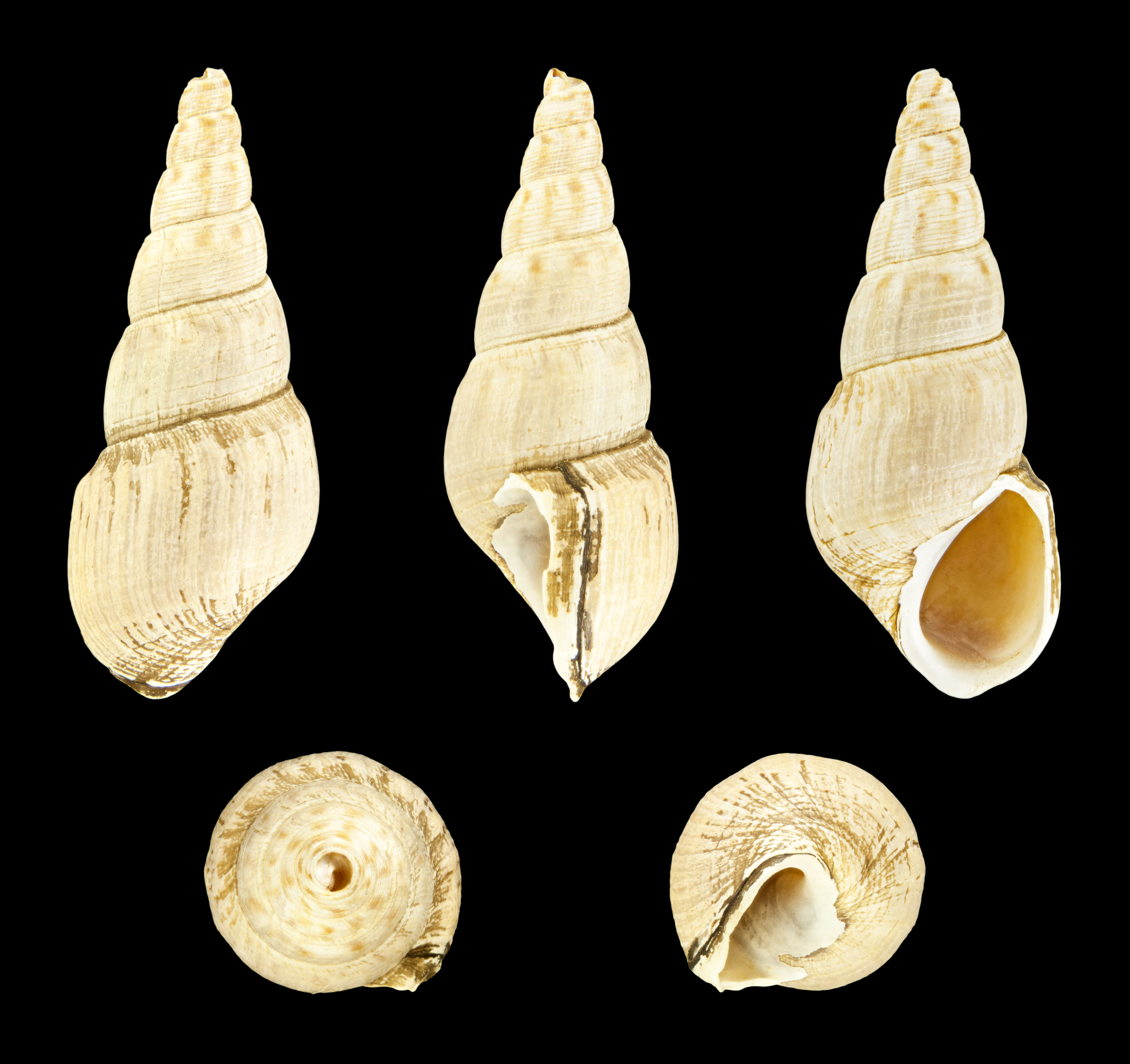
- Shell of Stenomelania costellaris

Scientific classification
- Kingdom: Animalia
- Phylum: Mollusca
- Class: Gastropoda
- Subclass: Caenogastropoda
- Order: incertae sedis
- Family: Thiaridae
- Genus: Stenomelania
- Species: S. costellaris

Binomial name
- Stenomelania costellaris (I. Lea & H. C. Lea, 1851)

Synonyms
- Melania costellaris I. Lea & H. C. Lea, 1851

= Stenomelania costellaris =

Species of gastropod

Stenomelania costellaris is a species of freshwater snail, an aquatic gastropod mollusc in the family Thiaridae.

== Distribution ==
The type locality is "small streams in the islands of Negros, Tanhay, Siquijor; Philippines". This species is also distributed China Hainan and Hong Kong, Japan, Taiwan, Celebes of Indonesia.
