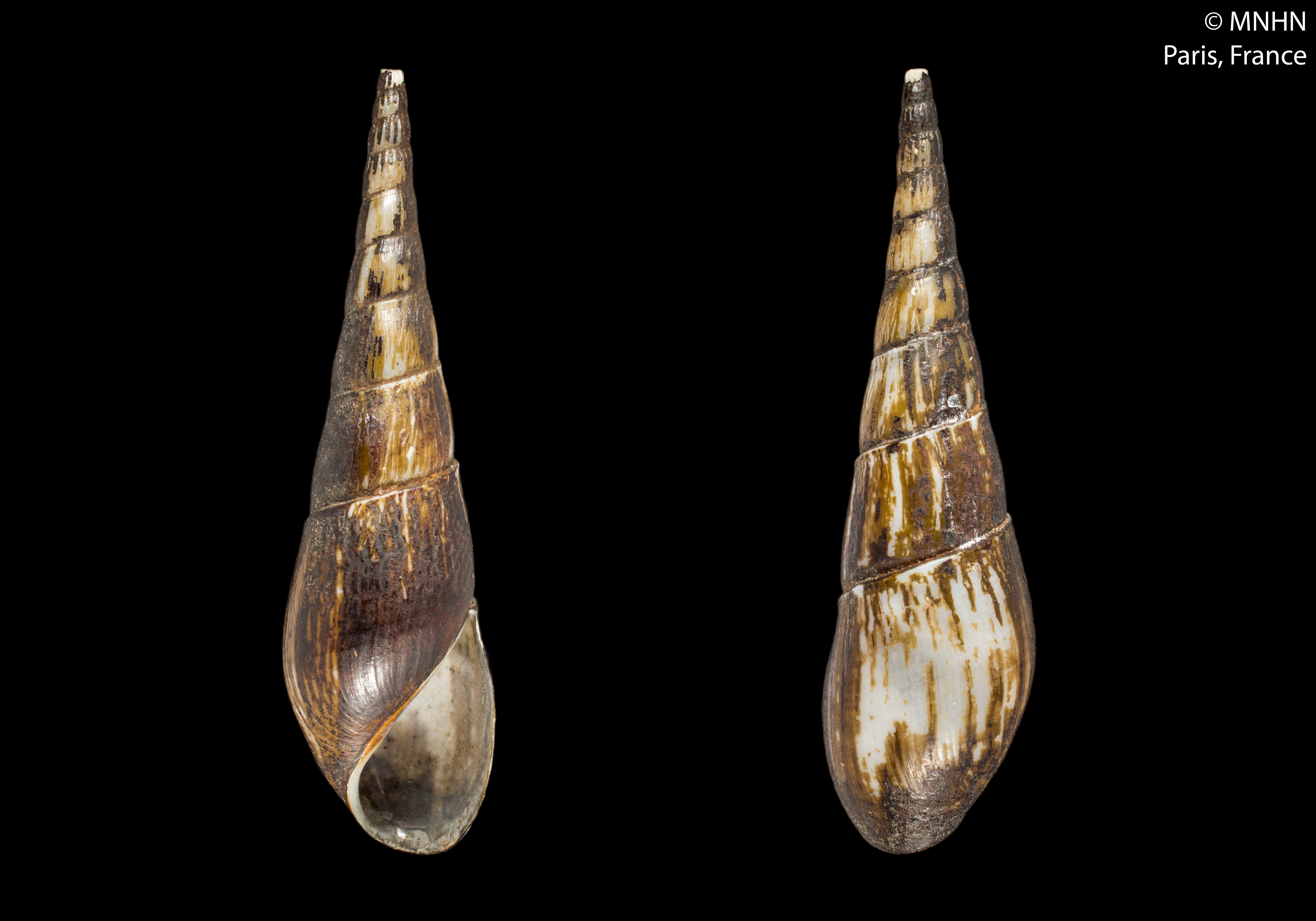
- Shell of Stenomelania uniformis (syntype at MNHN, Paris)

Conservation status
- Data Deficient (IUCN 3.1)

Scientific classification
- Kingdom: Animalia
- Phylum: Mollusca
- Class: Gastropoda
- Subclass: Caenogastropoda
- Order: incertae sedis
- Family: Thiaridae
- Genus: Stenomelania
- Species: S. uniformis

Binomial name
- Stenomelania uniformis (Quoy & Gaimard, 1834)

Synonyms
- Melania uniformis Quoy & Gaimard, 1834 (original combination); Melania uniformis var. plicatula E. von Martens, 1897 (invalid; not Deshayes, 1825 nor I. Lea, 1841); Melanoides uniformis Quoy & Gaimard, 1834

= Stenomelania uniformis =

Species of gastropod

Stenomelania uniformis is a species of freshwater snail, an aquatic gastropod mollusk in the family Thiaridae.

== Distribution ==
The species is currently known only from a small number of specimens collected in Japan. and Sulawesi, Indonesia.
