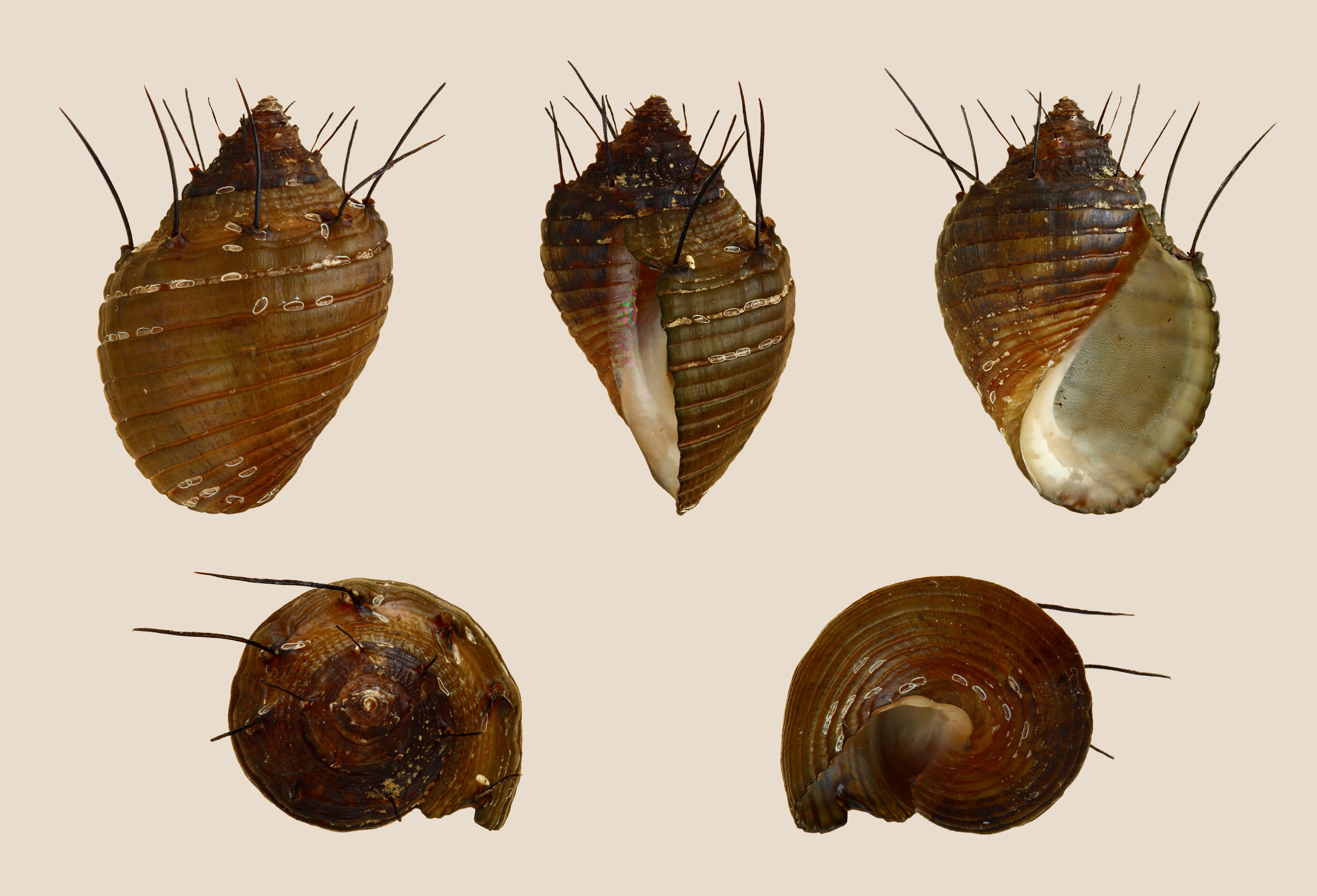
- Thiara cancellata shell

Scientific classification
- Kingdom: Animalia
- Phylum: Mollusca
- Class: Gastropoda
- Subclass: Caenogastropoda
- Order: incertae sedis
- Family: Thiaridae
- Genus: Thiara
- Species: T. cancellata

Binomial name
- Thiara cancellata Röding, 1798

Synonyms
- Melania (Tiaropsis) setosa Swainson, 1824; Melania setosa Swainson, 1824 junior subjective synonym

= Thiara cancellata =

Species of gastropod

Thiara cancellata is a species of freshwater snail, a gastropod mollusk in the family Thiaridae.

== Description ==
The length of the shell attains 23.7 mm.

== Distribution ==
This marine species occurs off the Philippines.

== Human use ==
It is a part of ornamental pet trade for freshwater aquaria.
