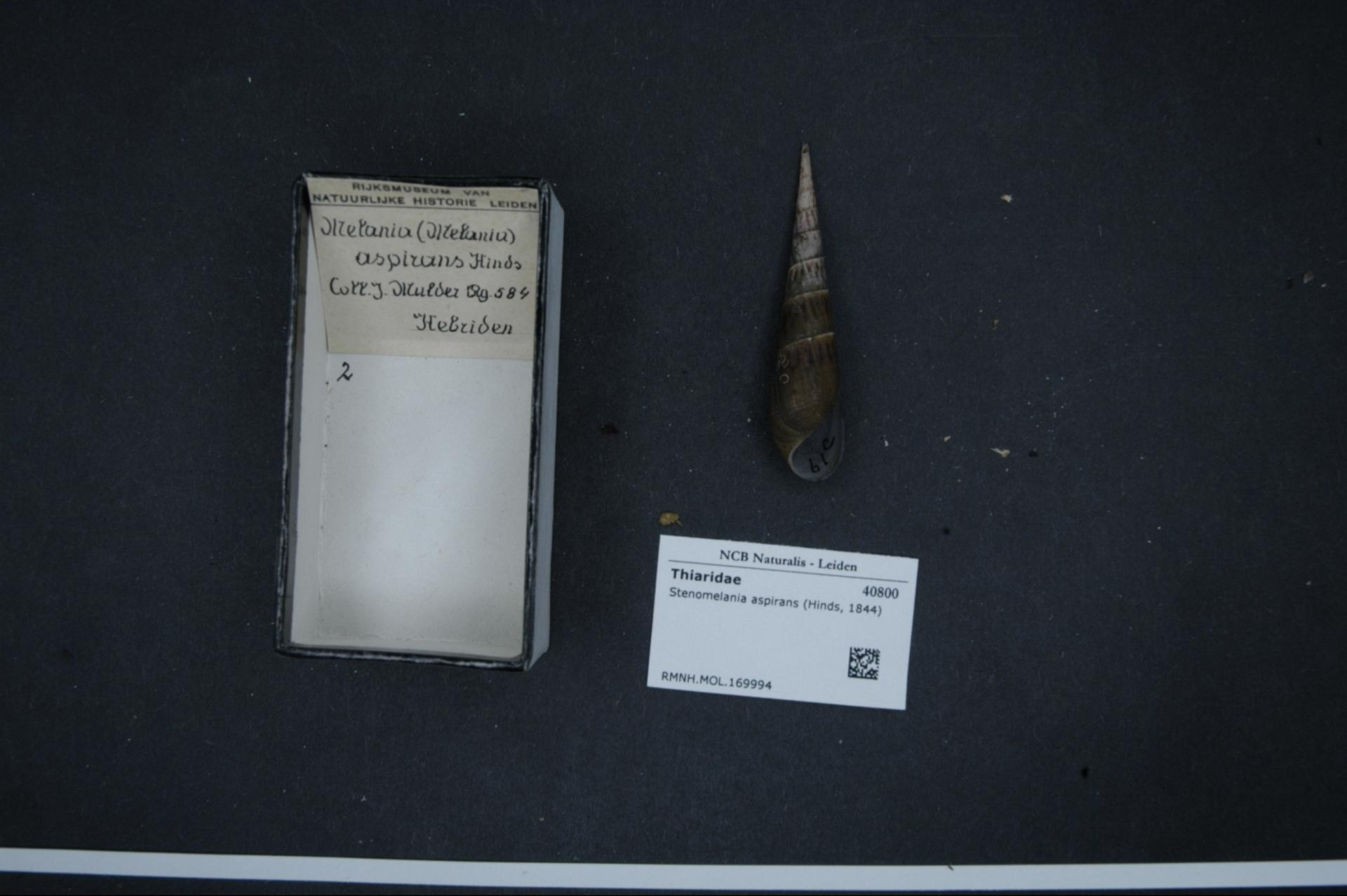
- Shell of Stenomelania aspirans

Scientific classification
- Domain: Eukaryota
- Kingdom: Animalia
- Phylum: Mollusca
- Class: Gastropoda
- Subclass: Caenogastropoda
- Family: Thiaridae
- Genus: Stenomelania
- Species: S. aspirans

Binomial name
- Stenomelania aspirans (Hinds, 1844)

Synonyms
- Melania aspirans Hinds, 1844

= Stenomelania aspirans =

Species of gastropod

Stenomelania aspirans is a species of freshwater snail, an aquatic gastropod mollusc in the family Thiaridae.

Stenomelania aspirans is the type species of the genus Stenomelania.
