= Stenomelania denisoniensis =

Conservation status
- Least Concern (IUCN 3.1)

Scientific classification
- Domain: Eukaryota
- Kingdom: Animalia
- Phylum: Mollusca
- Class: Gastropoda
- Subclass: Caenogastropoda
- Family: Thiaridae
- Genus: Stenomelania
- Species: S. denisoniensis

Binomial name
- Stenomelania denisoniensis (Brot, 1877)

Synonyms
- Melania denisoniensis Brot, 1877; Melanoides (Stenomelania) denisoniensis (Brot, 1877); Melanoides (Stenomelania) tacita (Iredale, 1943); Melanoides (Stenomelania) ultra (Iredale, 1943); Stenomelania denisoniensis tacita (Iredale, 1943; Stenomelania denisoniensis ultra (Iredale, 1943)

Species of gastropod

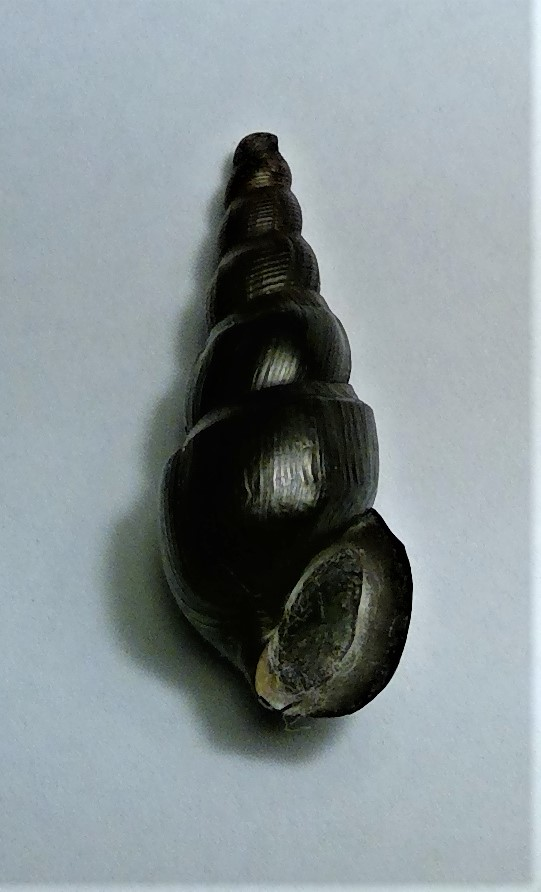
Stenomelania denisoniensis from the Ross River, Townsville, Queensland, Australia

Stenomelania denisoniensis is a very variable species of freshwater snail, an aquatic gastropod mollusk in the family Thiaridae. Stenomelania denisoniensis has a long, slender shell and small aperture. This species has a characteristic angled shoulder just below the suture. This shoulder may be strong in some individuals and weak in others even if they are part of the same population.

== Biology and ecology ==
"On and in sediment, rocks and on water weeds in freshwater rivers, streams, lakes and dams. A detritus and algal feeder. Stenomelania denisoniensis broods larvae in a brood pouch in the head which may contain a dozen shelled juveniles and many unshelled juveniles in different embryonic stages."

== Distribution ==
Distribution of Stenomelania denisoniensis is endemic to Australia and includes New South Wales and Queensland, the Northern Territory and Western Australia Is found most commonly found in tropical and subtropical Australia (the northern half of the continent).
