= Stenomelania torulosa =

Scientific classification
- Kingdom: Animalia
- Phylum: Mollusca
- Class: Gastropoda
- Subclass: Caenogastropoda
- Order: incertae sedis
- Family: Thiaridae
- Genus: Stenomelania
- Species: S. torulosa

Binomial name
- Stenomelania torulosa (Bruguière, 1789)

Synonyms
- Bulimus torulosus Bruguière, 1789; Melania aculeus I. Lea, 1834 (junior synonym); Melania confusa Dohrn, 1858 (junior synonym); Melania porcata Jonas, 1844 (junior synonym); Melania semicancellata von dem Busch, 1844 (junior synonym); Melania tirouri Quoy & Gaimard, 1834; Melanoides torulosus (Bruguière, 1789); Thiara torulosa (Bruguière, 1789)

Species of gastropod

Stenomelania torulosa is a species of a freshwater snail, an aquatic gastropod mollusk in the family Thiaridae.

== Distribution ==
India

== Ecology ==
The pollution tolerance value is 3 (on scale 0–10; 0 is the best water quality, 10 is the worst water quality).
