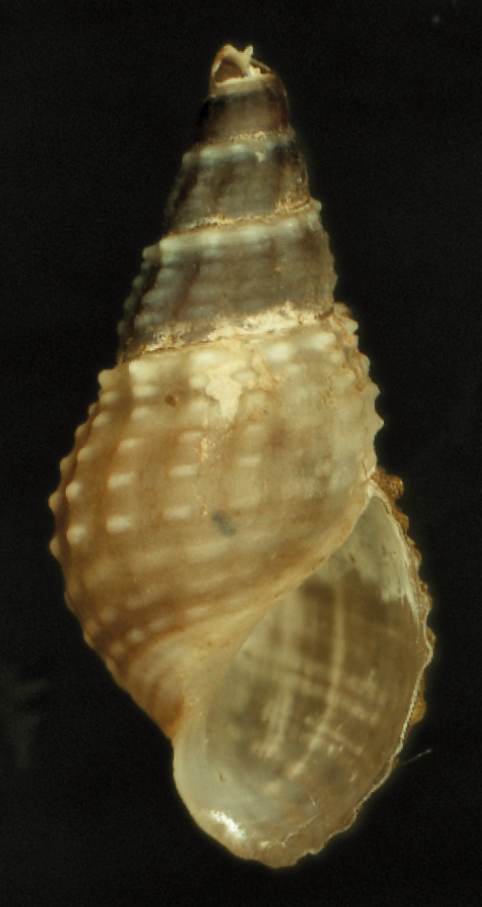
- shell of Tarebia granifera

Scientific classification
- Kingdom: Animalia
- Phylum: Mollusca
- Class: Gastropoda
- Subclass: Caenogastropoda
- Order: incertae sedis
- Superfamily: Cerithioidea
- Family: Thiaridae
- Subfamily: Thiarinae
- Genus: Tarebia; H. Adams & A. Adams, 1854

Type species
- Melania granifera Lamarck, 1816

Synonyms
- Melania (Tarebia) H. Adams & A. Adams, 1854; Melanoides (Tarebia) H. Adams & A. Adams, 1854 (Tarebia is a recent genus from the Far East); Thiara (Tarebia) H. Adams & A. Adams, 1854; Vibex (Tarebia) H. Adams & A. Adams, 1854 (original combination)

= Tarebia =

Genus of gastropods

Tarebia is a genus of freshwater snails, gastropod mollusks in the subfamily Thiarinae of the family Thiaridae.

== Species ==
Species within the genus Tarebia include:

- † Tarebia acuta (J. Sowerby, 1822)
- † Tarebia bojolaliensis (K. Martin, 1905)
- † Tarebia cardinalis (Lapparent, 1938)
- † Tarebia cerithioides (Rolle, 1858)
- † Tarebia darmavangiensis (K. Martin, 1905)
- Tarebia granifera (Lamarck, 1816)
- Tarebia hainesiana
- † Tarebia issiracensis (Fontannes, 1884)
- Tarebia invieta
- Tarebia lateritia
- Tarebia luzoniensis
- † Tarebia preangerensis (K. Martin, 1905)
- Tarebia semigranosa
- † Tarebia trimargaritifera (Ludwig, 1865)

Synonyms

- Tarebia obliquegranosa (E.A. Smith, 1878): synonym of Tarebia granifera (Lamarck, 1816) (a junior synonym)
