= Myserla =

Scientific classification
- Kingdom: Animalia
- Phylum: Arthropoda
- Clade: Pancrustacea
- Class: Insecta
- Order: Lepidoptera
- Superfamily: Noctuoidea
- Family: Erebidae
- Subfamily: Arctiinae
- Subtribe: Pericopina
- Genus: Myserla; Lamas, 2017
- Species: M. transversa

Binomial name
- Myserla transversa (Walker, 1854)

Synonyms
- Sermyla transversa Walker, 1854; Sermyla morta Schaus, 1892

Genus of moths

Myserla is a monotypic moth genus in the subfamily Arctiinae. Its only species, Myserla transversa, is found in Brazil. The species was first described as Sermyla transversa by Francis Walker in 1854. The genus name Sermyla was replaced by Myserla in 2017, as the former name was a junior homonym of a gastropod genus described earlier in 1854.
