= Melanoides nodicincta =

Conservation status
- Data Deficient (IUCN 3.1)

Scientific classification
- Domain: Eukaryota
- Kingdom: Animalia
- Phylum: Mollusca
- Class: Gastropoda
- Subclass: Caenogastropoda
- Family: Thiaridae
- Genus: Melanoides
- Species: M. nodicincta

Binomial name
- Melanoides nodicincta (Dohrn, 1865)

Synonyms
- Melania nodicincta Dohrn, 1865; Melania simonsi E. A. Smith, 1877; Melanoides simonsi (E. A. Smith, 1877)

Species of gastropod

Melanoides nodicincta is a species of freshwater snail with a gill and an operculum, an aquatic gastropod mollusk in the family Thiaridae. It was found at a depth of 10 to 90 feet (3.0 to 27.4 m).

Melania simonsi E. A. Smith, 1877 / Melanoides simonsi (E. A. Smith, 1877) is considered as a synonym of Melanoides nodicincta (Dohrn, 1865), but it may be a separate species.

== Distribution ==
This species is endemic to Malawi. The type locality is near the southern end of the Lake Malawi and in upper part of its outlet - the Shire River.

== Ecology ==
Its natural habitat is freshwater lakes.
