= Coelatura cridlandi =

Conservation status
- Endangered (IUCN 3.1)

Scientific classification
- Kingdom: Animalia
- Phylum: Mollusca
- Class: Bivalvia
- Order: Unionida
- Family: Unionidae
- Genus: Coelatura
- Species: C. cridlandi

Binomial name
- Coelatura cridlandi Mandahl-Barth, 1954

Species of bivalve

Coelatura cridlandi is a species of freshwater mussel, an aquatic bivalve mollusk in the family Unionidae, the river mussels. This species is found in Africa, in Kenya, Tanzania, and Uganda. Its natural habitat is freshwater lakes.
