= Coelatura horei =

Conservation status
- Least Concern (IUCN 3.1)

Scientific classification
- Kingdom: Animalia
- Phylum: Mollusca
- Class: Bivalvia
- Order: Unionida
- Family: Unionidae
- Genus: Coelatura
- Species: C. horei

Binomial name
- Coelatura horei (E. A. Smith, 1880)

Synonyms
- Unio Horei E. A. Smith, 1880; Unio bohmi von Martens, 1897; Unio calathus Bourguignat, 1885; Unio charbonnieri Bourguignat, 1886; Unio gereti Preston, 1910; Unio gerrardi von Martens, 1897; Unio randibeli Bourguignat, 1886

Species of bivalve

Coelatura horei is a species of freshwater mussel, an aquatic bivalve mollusk in the family Unionidae, the river mussels.

This species is found in Africa, in Burundi, the Democratic Republic of the Congo, and Tanzania. Its natural habitat is freshwater lakes.
