= Edgar Albert Smith =

British zoologist (1847–1916)

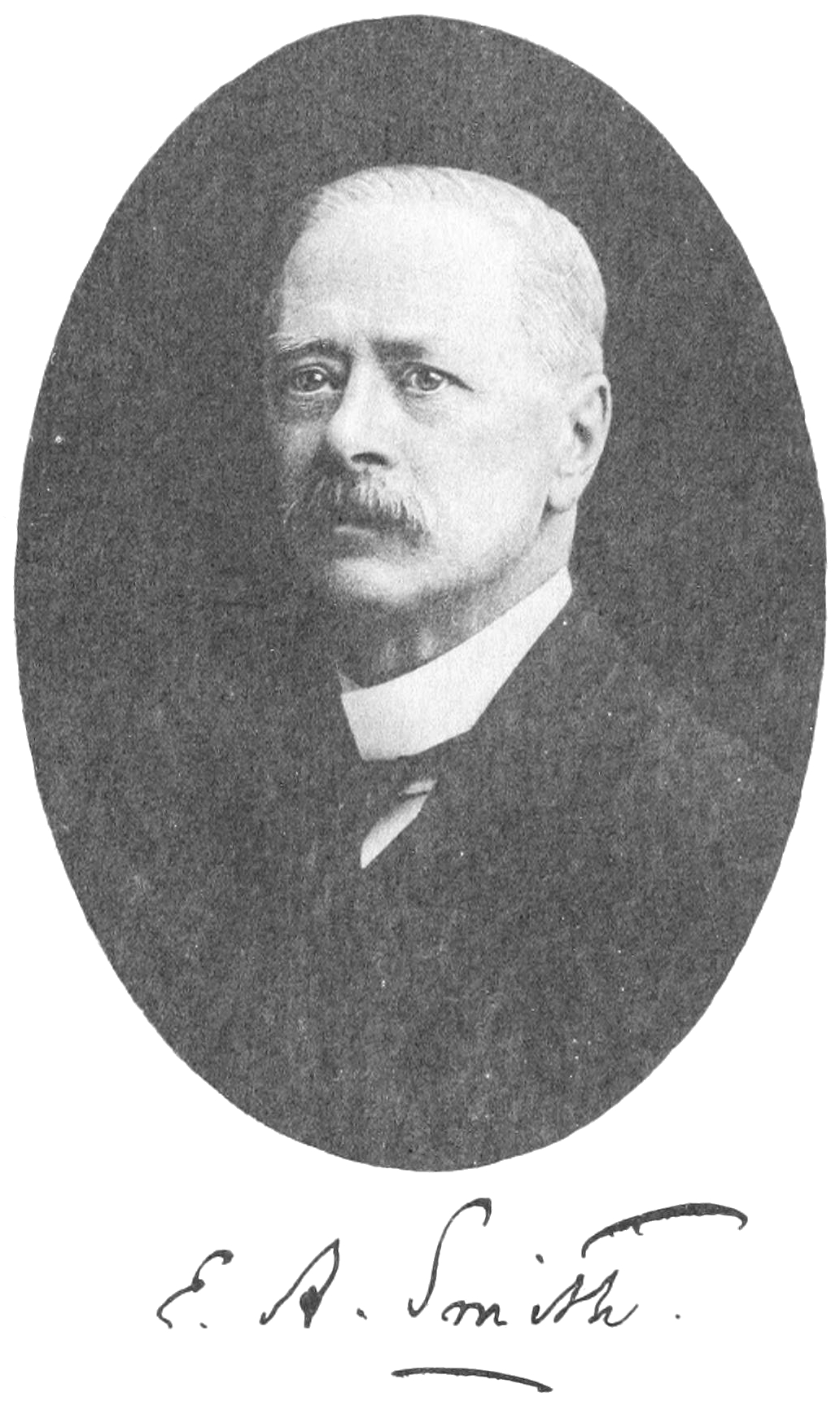
- Born: 29 November 1847; London, England
- Died: 22 July 1916 (aged 68); Acton, London, England
- Children: 6
- Father: Frederick Smith
- Scientific career
- Fields: Zoology, malacology
- Workplaces: British Museum, now named Natural History Museum
- Author abbrev. (zoology): E. A. Smith

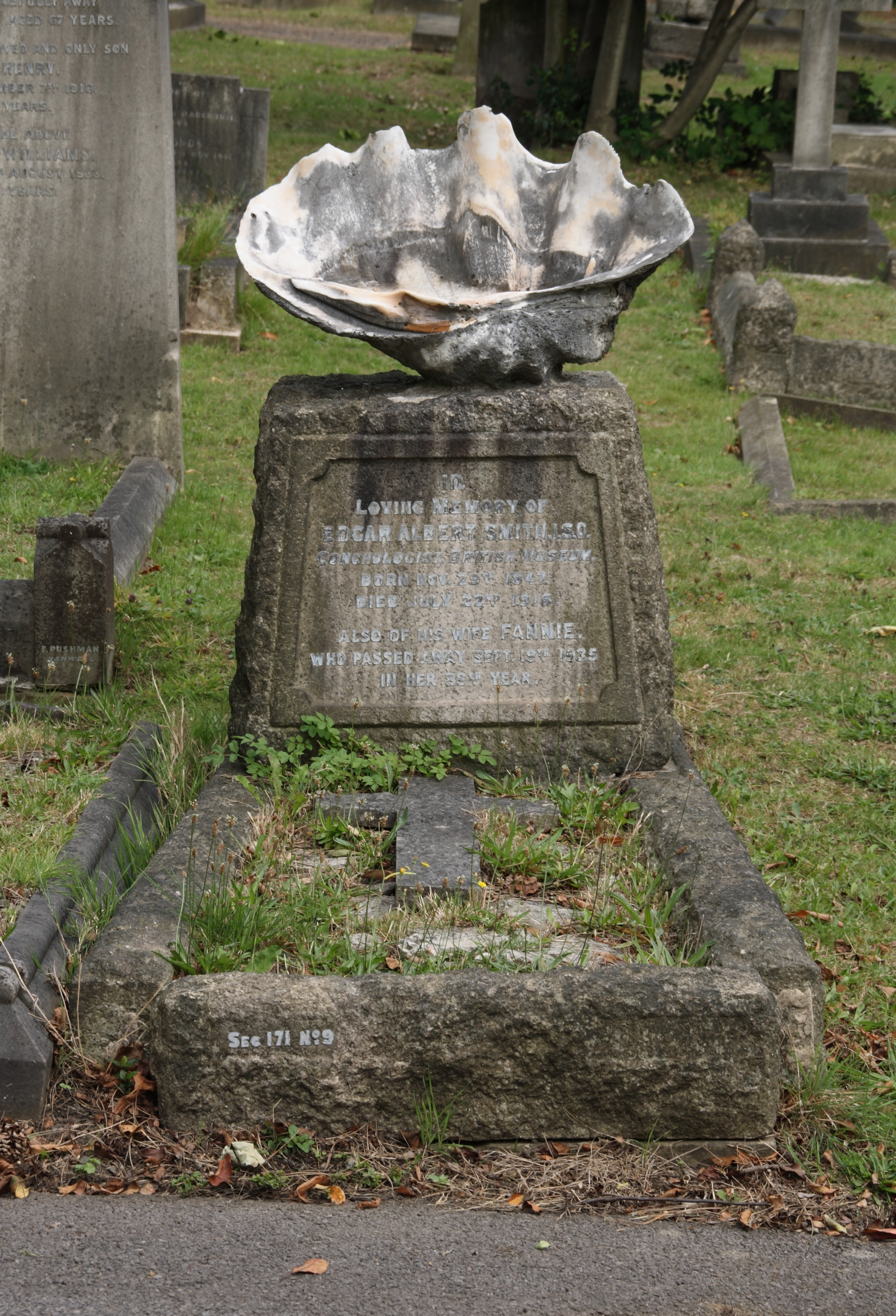
The grave of Edgar Albert Smith, with a shell of the giant clam on top of the headstone

Edgar Albert Smith (29 November 1847 – 22 July 1916) was a British zoologist and malacologist.

His father was Frederick Smith, a well-known entomologist, and assistant keeper of zoology in the British Museum, Bloomsbury. Edgar Albert Smith was educated both at the North London Collegiate School and privately, being well grounded in Latin amongst other subjects, as his excellent diagnoses bear witness.

Smith married in July 1876. Subsequently, his wife and he had four sons and two daughters.

He gave more prominent attention to the fauna of the African Great Lakes and the marine molluscs of South Africa, and also the non-marine mollusc fauna of Borneo and New Guinea.

== In the British Museum ==
Smith was employed at the British Museum (now Natural History Museum) as an assistant keeper of the zoological department for more than 40 years, from 1867 to 1913. Edgar Smith's first work was in connection with the celebrated collection of shells made by Hugh Cuming and acquired by the museum in 1846, at which he worked under Dr. John Edward Gray. From 1871, he was in immediate charge of the collection of molluscs, whilst till 1878, he was also responsible for the rest of the marine invertebrates with the exception of the Crustacea. On the removal of the natural history collections from Bloomsbury to South Kensington, the arrangement of the Molluscan Collection in the then new Natural History Museum was, of course, his peculiar care and was planned by him with a special eye to the convenience of the numerous students and amateur collectors who have not been slow to avail themselves of it. In 1895, Edgar Smith obtained his well-deserved promotion to the post of assistant keeper in the Zoological Department.

== Expeditions ==
Smith studied molluscs brought back by various expeditions such as those to Antarctic of HMS Erebus and HMS Terror (1839–1843), which had lain by untouched, were dealt with by him in 1875. The Arctic specimens, collected on the polar voyage of HMS Alert and HMS Discovery (1875–1876), were described in 1878. The results of the Transit of Venus Expedition (1874–1875) to Kerguelen Islands and Rodrigues were set forth in the special volume (vol. clxviii) of the Philosophical Transactions of the Royal Society in 1879. The accounts of shells procured during the voyages of Alert to the Straits of Magellan and the Indo-Pacific (1878–1882) were published in 1881 and 1884.

The reports on the bivalves and Heteropoda brought home by the Challenger expedition (1873–1876) were the most noteworthy of this series, and appeared in 1885 and 1888, respectively.

Mention must also be made of his reports on the collections of molluscs of SS Southern Cross during Southern Cross expedition published 1902, from Sokotra 1903, from the Maldives and Laccadives 1902 and 1903, from the National Antarctic expedition of 1901–1904 in 1907, and finally the Terra Nova expedition in the Antarctic of 1910 in published in 1915.

== Awards and memberships ==
Smith became a fellow of the Zoological Society of London in 1872. He became a member of the Conchological Society of Great Britain and Ireland in 1886 and he became president of the Conchological Society in 1890. He was also a corresponding member of the Linnaean Society of New South Wales, and of the Academy of Natural Sciences of Philadelphia, whilst he was also made an honorary member of the Midland Malacological Society, as well as of the Malacological Section of the Birmingham Natural History and Philosophical Society. He was a founding member of the Malacological Society of London, and was the president of the Malacological Society of London in 1901–1903. He was an editor of Proceedings of the Malacological Society of London in 1904–1916, and at the time of his death. He served as a member of the British Association Committee which was appointed in 1890 to "Report on the present state of our knowledge of the Zoology of the Sandwich Islands", and which reported regularly from 1891 till 1912.

He received the Imperial Service Order in 1903, for his long and meritorious services to science.

== Bibliography ==
Smith wrote 10 papers on the Echinodermata, published between 1876 and 1879. Most of his efforts, though, went into the systematic study of molluscs. His research resulted in the publication of 300 separate memoirs on the Mollusca, and a few dealing with the Echinodermata. Among his valuable works is the account of the bivalves collected by theChallenger expedition.

He was the author of A Guide to the Shell and Starfish Galleries (London, 1901), with Francis Jeffrey Bell (1855–1924) and Randolph Kirkpatrick (1863–1950), foreword by Sir Edwin Ray Lankester.

=== From Africa ===
The molluscan faunas of the African Great Lakes also claimed his attention, and formed the subject of a presidential address before the Malacological Society of London, in which no support was given to the views of Mr. John Edmund Sharrock Moore, who regarded the gastropods of Lake Tanganyika as representing forms that had their origin in marine Jurassic times. Smith had described 18 new taxa based on shells collected by explorer Joseph Thomson. His works about freshwater snails of Africa include a number of papers; new taxa described by Smith include:

1877

- Smith E. A. (1877). "On the shells of Lake Nyasa, and on a few marine species from Mozambique". Proceedings of the Zoological Society of London 1877: 712–722. Plates 74–75.
  - Melanoides turritispira (E. A. Smith, 1877)
  - Melanoides pupiformis (E. A. Smith, 1877)
  - Melanoides polymorpha (E. A. Smith, 1877)
  - Melania simonsi E. A. Smith, 1877 – it is considered as a synonym of Melanoides nodicincta (Dohrn, 1865), but it may be a separate species.
  - Melanoides nyassana (E. A. Smith, 1877)
  - Lanistes solidus E. A. Smith, 1877
  - Lanistes affinis E. A. Smith, 1877 is a synonym of Lanistes ellipticus Martens, 1866
  - Gabbiella stanleyi (E. A. Smith, 1877)
  - Bulinus nyassanus (E. A. Smith, 1877)
  - Bulinus succinoides (E. A. Smith, 1877)
  - Bullia mozambicensis E. A. Smith, 1877
  - Donax aemulus E. A. Smith, 1877 is a synonym of Donax lubricus Hanley, 1845

1880

- Smith E. A. (1880). "On the shells of Lake Tanganyika and of the neighbourhood of Ujiji, central Africa". Proceedings of the Zoological Society of London 1880: 344–352. Plate 31.
  - Limicolaria martensiana (E. A. Smith, 1880)
  - Ennea lata E. A. Smith, 1880
  - Ennea ujijiensis E. A. Smith, 1880
  - Tiphobia E. A. Smith, 1880
  - Neothauma E. A. Smith, 1880
  - Neothauma tanganyicense E. A. Smith, 1880
- Smith E. A. (1880). "Diagnoses of new shells from Lake Tanganyika and East Africa". Annals and Magazine of Natural History (5)6: 425–430.
  - Limnotrochus E. A. Smith, 1880
  - Limnotrochus thomsoni E. A. Smith, 1880
  - Chytra kirkii (E. A. Smith, 1880)
  - Stanleya neritinoides (E. A. Smith, 1880)
  - Tanganyicia rufofilosa (E. A. Smith, 1880)
  - Syrnolopsis E. A. Smith, 1880
  - Syrnolopsis lacustris E. A. Smith, 1880
  - Melanoides admirabilis (E. A. Smith, 1880)
  - Melania tanganyicensis E. A. Smith, 1880 is a synonym of Melanoides polymorpha (E. A. Smith, 1877)
  - Mabiliella notabilis (E. A. Smith, 1880)
  - Achatina thomsoni E. A. Smith, 1880 is a synonym of Achatina spekei Dohrn
  - Achatina kirkii E. A. Smith, 1880
  - Subulona solidiuscula (E. A. Smith, 1880)
  - Subulona lenta (E. A. Smith, 1880)
  - Streptaxis craveni E. A. Smith, 1880
  - Streptaxis gigas E. A. Smith, 1880 was described according to juvenile shell and it has never been found again. It belong to genus Gigantaxis (E. A. Smith, 1880)
  - Gonaxis mozambicensis (E. A. Smith, 1880)
  - Caelatura aegyptica (Cailliaud, 1826) f. horei (E. A. Smith, 1880) or Coelatura horei (E. A. Smith, 1880)
  - Unio thomsoni E. A. Smith, 1880 is a synonym of Grandideriera burtoni (Woodward, 1859)

1881

- Smith E. A. (1881). "On a collection of shells from lakes Tanganyika and Nyassa and other localities in East Africa". Proceedings of the Zoological Society of London 1881: 276–300. Plates 32–34.
  - Zingis nyassana (E. A. Smith, 1881)
  - Achatina craveni E. A. Smith, 1881
  - Ampullaria gradata E. A. Smith, 1881 is a synonym of Pila ovata (Olivier, 1804)
  - Segmentina (Planorbula) alexandrina Ehrenberg var. tanganyicensis E. A. Smith, 1881 is referred as a synonym of Biomphalaria sudanica (von Martens, 1870)
  - Unio nyassaensis Lea var. tanganyicensis E. A. Smith, 1881 is a synonym of Nyassunio nyassaensis (Lea, 1864)
- Smith E. A. (1881). "Descriptions of two new species of shells from Lake Tanganyika". Proceedings of the Zoological Society of London 1881: 558–561.
  - Paramelania E. A. Smith, 1881
  - Paramelania damoni (E. A. Smith, 1881)
  - Tiphobia (Paramelania) nassa Woodward var. paucicostata E. A. Smith, 1881 is a synonym of Lavigeria nassa (Woodward, 1859)

1890

  - Streptostele (Raffraya) horei E. A. Smith, 1890
  - Thapsia hanningtoni (E. A. Smith, 1890)

1895

  - Limicolaria saturata E. A. Smith, 1895

1899

  - Curvella nyasana E. A. Smith, 1899
  - Curvella whytei E. A. Smith, 1899

1901

  - Gulella (Molarella) ugandensis (E. A. Smith, 1901)

1903

  - Punctum ugandanum (E. A. Smith, 1903)
  - Trachycystis lamellifera (E. A. Smith, 1903)

1904

- Smith E. A. (1904). "Some remarks on the Mollusca of Lake Tanganyika". Proceedings of the Malacological Society of London 6: 77–104.
  - Bridouxia rotundata (E. A. Smith, 1904)
  - Burtonilla E. A. Smith, 1904 is a synonym of Anceya Bourguignat, 1885

=== From Madagascar ===
- Smith E. A. (1882). "A contribution to the Molluscan fauna of Madagascar". Proceedings of the Zoological Society of London 1882: 375–390. plates 21–22.
  - Madagasikara johnsoni (E. A. Smith, 1882)
  - ...

=== From Borneo ===
- Smith E. A. (1904). "Description of a new species of Opisthostoma from Borneo". Proceedings of the Malacological Society of London 6: 105.
  - Opisthostoma beddomei E. A. Smith, 1904

=== From New Zealand ===
- Potamopyrgus jenkinsi (E. A. Smith, 1889) is a synonym of Potamopyrgus antipodarum (Gray, 1843)

Mr. Smith had some slight connection with geological work, as he was appealed to on more than one occasion to determine molluscan remains found in the post-Pliocene deposits of South Africa, when the majority of the species could be referred to recent forms. He was also joint author with Richard Bullen Newton of a paper:

- Newton R. B. & Smith E. A. (1912). "On the survival of a Miocene Oyster in Recent Seas". Records of the Geological Survey of India 42: 1–15 pp., 8 plates.

=== From South America ===
1877

  - Plekocheilus roseolabrum (E. A. Smith, 1877)
  - Drymaeus aequatorianus (E. A. Smith, 1877)
  - Drymaeus albolabiatus (E. A. Smith, 1877)
  - Drymaeus ochrocheilus (E. A. Smith, 1877)
  - Drymaeus orthostomus (E. A. Smith, 1877)
  - Drymaeus flavidulus (E. A. Smith, 1877)
  - Drymaeus subpellucidus (E. A. Smith, 1877)

1907

- Smith E. A. (1907). "Notes on Achatina dennisoni Reeve, and A. magnifica Pfeiffer". Proceedings of the Malacological Society of London 7: 313–314.
  - no new taxa

=== Marine gastropods ===
1904

- Smith, Edgar A. (1904) . On a Collection of Marine Shells from Port Alfred, Cape Colony; Journal of Malacology, xi, p. 27, pi. 2, fig. 3

1907

- Smith E. A. (1907). "Notes on some species of Mitridae, with the description of M. Brettinghami, n.sp." Proceedings of the Malacological Society of London 7: 124–314.
  - Mitra brettinghami E. A. Smith, 1907
- Smith E. A. (1907). "Description of a new species of Calliostoma from South Formosa". Proceedings of the Malacological Society of London 7: 205.
  - Calliostoma formosense E. A. Smith, 1907
