= Coelatura alluaudi =

Conservation status
- Vulnerable (IUCN 3.1)

Scientific classification
- Kingdom: Animalia
- Phylum: Mollusca
- Class: Bivalvia
- Order: Unionida
- Family: Unionidae
- Genus: Coelatura
- Species: C. alluaudi

Binomial name
- Coelatura alluaudi (Dautzenberg, 1908)

Species of bivalve

Coelatura alluaudi is a species of freshwater mussel, an aquatic bivalve mollusk in the family Unionidae, the river mussels.

This species is found in Africa, in Kenya, Tanzania, and Uganda. Its natural habitat is freshwater lakes.
