= Coelatura ratidota =

Conservation status
- Data Deficient (IUCN 3.1)

Scientific classification
- Kingdom: Animalia
- Phylum: Mollusca
- Class: Bivalvia
- Order: Unionida
- Family: Unionidae
- Genus: Coelatura
- Species: C. ratidota

Binomial name
- Coelatura ratidota (Charmes, 1885)

Species of bivalve

Coelatura ratidota is a species of freshwater mussel, an aquatic bivalve mollusc in the family Unionidae, the river mussels.

This species is found in Africa, in Kenya and Tanzania. Its natural habitats are rivers and intermittent rivers.
