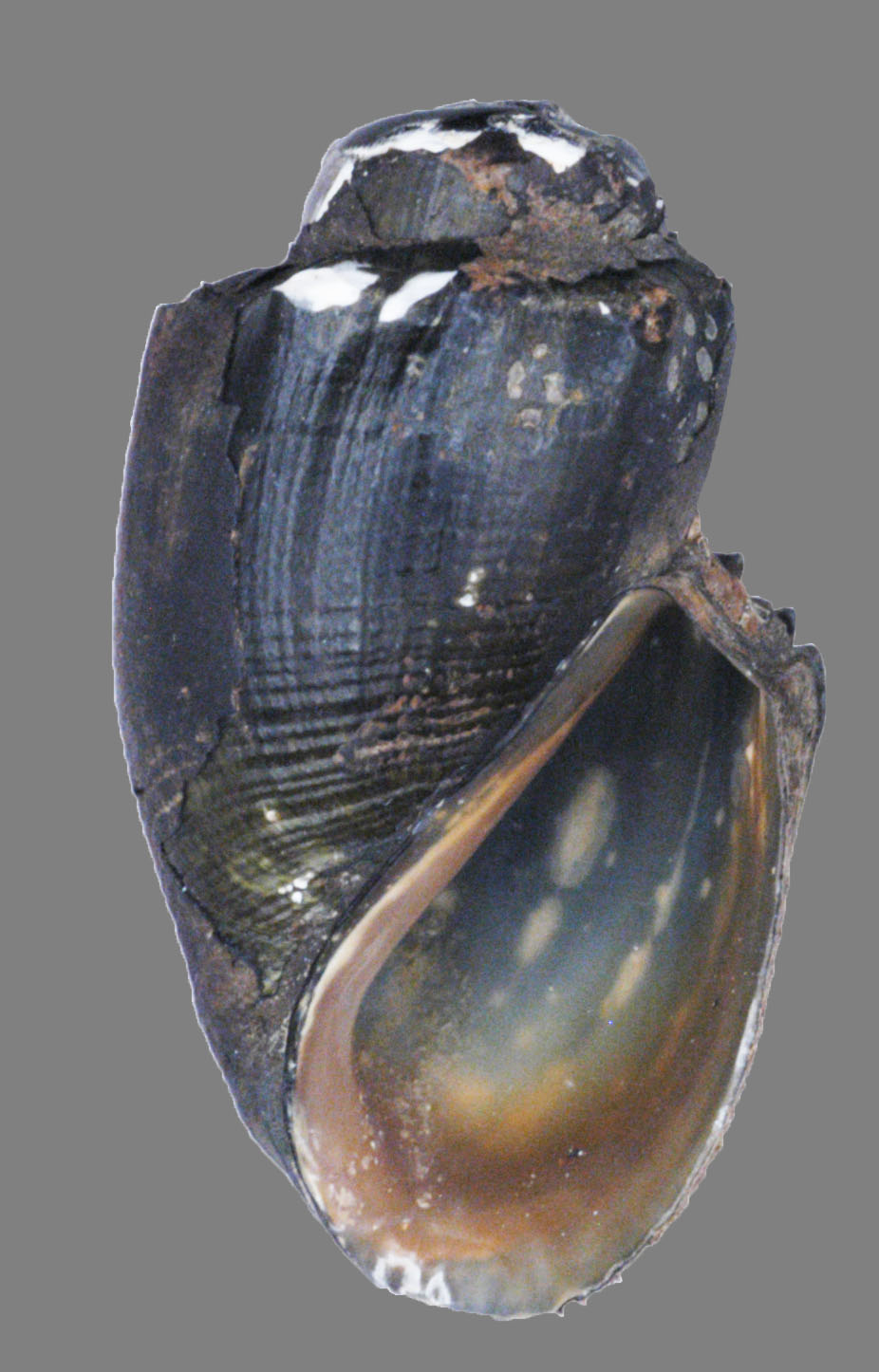

Scientific classification
- Kingdom: Animalia
- Phylum: Mollusca
- Class: Gastropoda
- Subclass: Caenogastropoda
- Order: incertae sedis
- Family: Thiaridae
- Genus: Thiara
- Species: T. amarula

Binomial name
- Thiara amarula (Linnaeus, 1758)

Synonyms
- Helix amarula Linnaeus, 1758 (original combination); Melania coacta Mörch, 1872 (junior synonym); Melania cybele A. Gould, 1847 (junior synonym); Melania diadema I. Lea & H. C. Lea, 1851 (junior synonym); Melania holoserica Leschke, 1912 ·; Melania speciosa A. Adams, 1853 (junior synonym); Melania thiarella Lamarck, 1822 (junior synonym); Melania villosa Philippi, 1849 (junior synonym); Melania villosa var. elongata Schepman, 1918 (preoccupied); Thiara amaruloidea Iredale, 1943; Thiara vouamica Bourguignat, 1890 (junior synonym)

= Thiara amarula =

Species of gastropod

Thiara amarula is a species of freshwater gastropod belonging to the family Thiaridae.

== Description ==
The length of the shell attains 32 mm.

== Distribution ==
The species is found in Malesia and the coasts of the Indian and Pacific Oceans off Queensland, Australia, southeastern Africa, and Madagascar.
