= Coelatura =

Scientific classification
- Domain: Eukaryota
- Kingdom: Animalia
- Phylum: Mollusca
- Class: Bivalvia
- Order: Unionida
- Family: Unionidae
- Genus: Coelatura; Conrad, 1853

Genus of bivalves

Coelatura is a genus of bivalve in the Unionidae family.

== Species ==
Species:

- Coelatura aegyptiaca (Cailliaud, 1827)
- Coelatura alluaudi (Dautzenberg, 1908)
- Coelatura bakeri (H.Adams, 1866)
- Coelatura briarti (Dautzenberg, 1901)
- Coelatura choziensis (Preston, 1910)
- Coelatura cridlandi Mandahl-Barth, 1954
- Coelatura disciformis (Rochebrune, 1886)
- Coelatura essoensis (Chaper, 1885)
- Coelatura gabonensis (Küster, 1862)
- Coelatura gommeryi Musalizi, 2017
- Coelatura hauttecoeuri (Bourguignat, 1883)
- Coelatura horei (E.A.Smith, 1880)
- Coelatura hypsiprymna (Haas, 1936)
- Coelatura hypsiprymna (von Martens, 1897)
- Coelatura kipopoensis Mandahl-Barth, 1968
- Coelatura kunenensis (Mousson, 1888)
- Coelatura leopoldvillensis (Putzeys, 1898)
- Coelatura lobensis (Frierson, 1913)
- Coelatura luapulaensis (Preston, 1913)
- Coelatura madagascariensis (Sganzin, 1841)
- Coelatura malgachensis (Germain, 1911)
- Coelatura mossambicensis (E.von Martens, 1860)
- Coelatura ratidota (Charmes, 1885)
- Coelatura rothschildi (Neuville & R.Anthony, 1906)
- Coelatura rotula Pilsbry & Bequaert, 1927
- Coelatura scholzi Van Damme & Pickford, 2010
- Coelatura stagnorum (Dautzenberg, 1890)
- Coelatura stuhlmanni (E.von Martens, 1897)

== See also ==
Coelatura L. Pfeiffer, 1877 is a synonym of Plegma Gude, 1911, a land snail.
