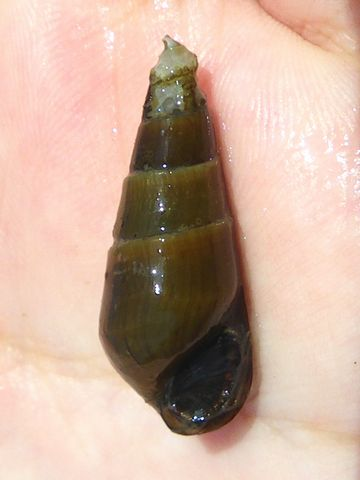
- A live but retracted individual of Stenomelania crenulata

Scientific classification
- Kingdom: Animalia
- Phylum: Mollusca
- Class: Gastropoda
- Subclass: Caenogastropoda
- Order: incertae sedis
- Superfamily: Cerithioidea
- Family: Thiaridae
- Genus: Stenomelania; P. Fischer, 1885

Type species
- Melania aspirans Hinds, 1844

Synonyms
- Melania (Stenomelania) P. Fischer, 1885 (original rank); Melanoides (Stenomelania) P. Fischer, 1885

= Stenomelania =

Genus of gastropods

Stenomelania is a genus of freshwater snails with a gill and an operculum, aquatic gastropod mollusks in the subfamily Thiarinae of the family Thiaridae known as thiarids.

== Species ==
Species within the genus Stenomelania include:

- Stenomelania acutospira (I. Lea, 1850)
- Stenomelania amabilis (G. von dem Busch)
- Stenomelania aspirans (Hinds, 1844) - type species of the genus Stenomelania
- Stenomelania blatta (I. Lea, 1850)
- Stenomelania boninensis (I. Lea, 1856)
- Stenomelania brenchleyi (Baird, 1873)
- Stenomelania clavus (J.B.P.A. Lamarck, 1822)
- Stenomelania coarctata (J.B.P.A. Lamarck, 1822)
- Stenomelania costellaris (I. Lea & H. C. Lea, 1851)
- Stenomelania crenulata (Deshayes, 1838) - synonym: Stenomelania rufescens (Martens, 1860)
- Stenomelania denisoniensis (Brot, 1877)
- Stenomelania distinguenda (A. Brot)
- † Stenomelania dollfusi (Jodot, 1928)
- Stenomelania erosa (Lesson, 1831)
- Stenomelania graeffei (A. Mousson)
- |Stenomelania iaxa (A. Mousson)
- Stenomelania juncea (I. Lea & H. C. Lea, 1851)
- Stenomelania lancea (I. Lea, 1850)
- Stenomelania litigiosa (A. Brot, 1877)
- Stenomelania loebbeckii (A. Brot, 1877)
- Stenomelania luctuosa (Hinds, 1844)
- Stenomelania lutosa (A. Gould, 1847)
- Stenomelania macilenta (Menke, 1830)
- Stenomelania mucronata (von dem Busch, 1853)
- Stenomelania persulcata (Mousson, 1869)
- Stenomelania plicaria I. von Born, 1778
- Stenomelania punctata (Lamarck, 1822)
- Stenomelania rustica (Mousson, 1857)
- Stenomelania torulosa (Bruguière, 1789) - synonym: Bulimus torulosus Bruguière, 1789
- Stenomelania uniformis Quoy & Gaimard, 1834
- Stenomelania waigiensis (Lesson, 1831)

Synonyms:

- Stenomelania arthurii (Brot, 1870): synonym of Stenomelania persulcata (Mousson, 1869) (junior synonym)
- Stenomelania funiculus (Quoy & Gaimard, 1834): synonym of Stenomelania plicaria (Born, 1778)
- Stenomelania hastula (I. Lea, 1850): synonym of Stenomelania plicaria (Born, 1778)
- Stenomelania housei Lea, 1856 is a synonym of Sulcospira housei (Lea, 1856)
- Stenomelania rufescens (Martens, 1860): synonym of Stenomelania crenulata (Deshayes, 1838)
- Stenomelania semicancellata (von dem Busch, 1844): synonym of Stenomelania torulosa (Bruguière, 1789) (junior subjective synonym)
