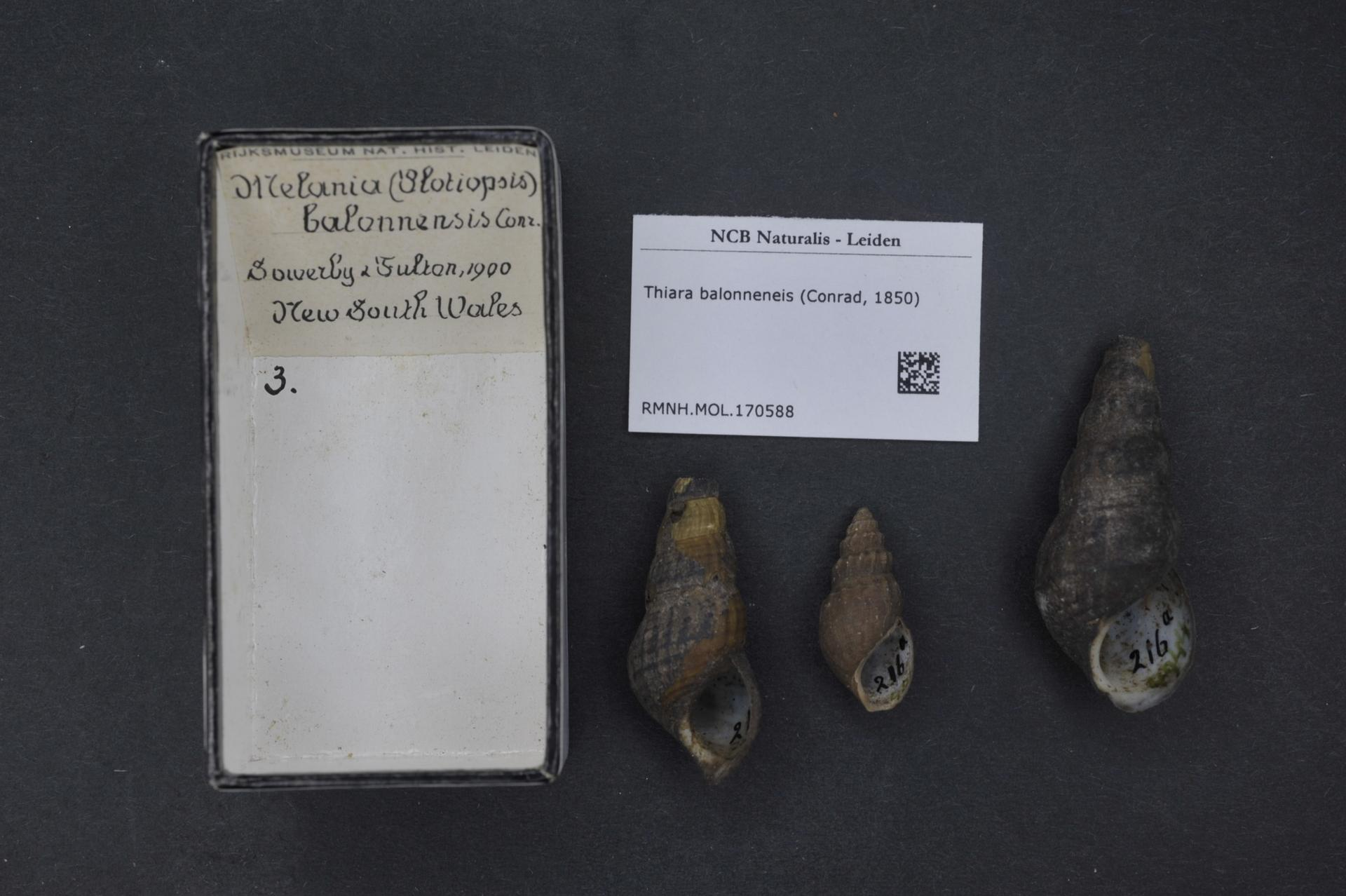
- Plotiopsis balonnensis shells

Scientific classification
- Kingdom: Animalia
- Phylum: Mollusca
- Class: Gastropoda
- Subclass: Caenogastropoda
- Order: incertae sedis
- Family: Thiaridae
- Genus: Plotiopsis; Brot, 1874
- Species: P. balonnensis

Binomial name
- Plotiopsis balonnensis (Conrad, 1850)

Synonyms
- Melania balonnensis Conrad, 1850 (original combination); Melania incerta Brot, 1862; Melania lirata Menke, 1843 (primary homonym of Melania lirata Benson, 1843; Melania incerta is a replacement name); Melania oncoides Tenison-Woods, 1878; Melania subsimilis E. A. Smith, 1882; Melania tatei Brazier, 1881; Melania tetrica Conrad, 1850 (invalid: junior homonym of Melania tetrica Gould, 1847; Melania tatei is a replacement name); Plotiopsis centralia Cotton, 1943; Plotiopsis flata Iredale, 1944; Plotiopsis sociana Iredale, 1944; Plotiopsis subornata Iredale, 1943; Plotiopsis thrascia Iredale, 1944; Thiara balonnensis (Conrad, 1850)

= Plotiopsis =

Species of gastropod

Plotiopsis balonnensis is a species of freshwater snail, a gastropod mollusc in the family Thiaridae. It is the only species in the genus Plotiopsis.

== Ecology ==
Parasites of Plotiopsis balonnensis include trematode Sychnocotyle kholo.
