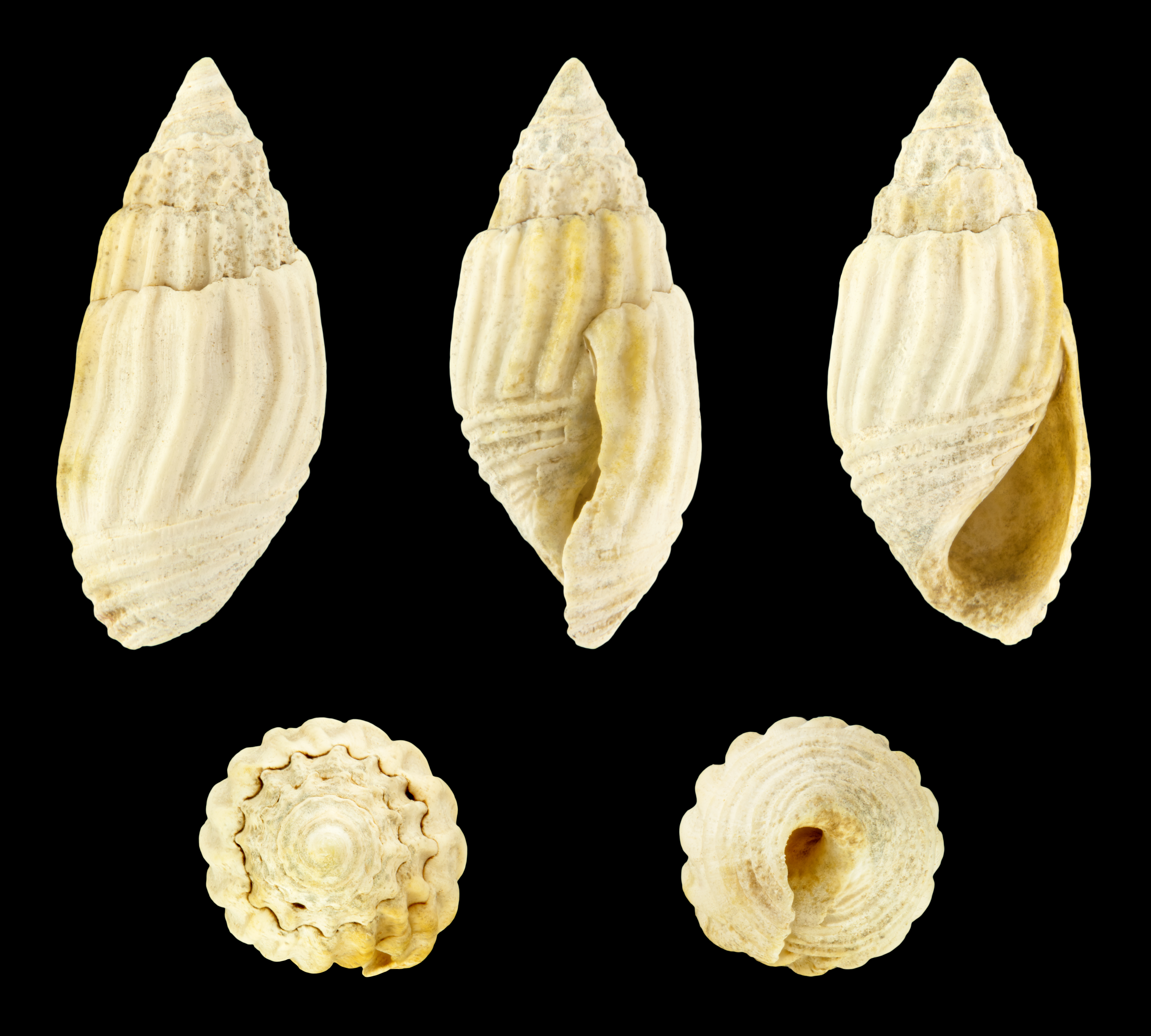
- Sermyla riquetii shells

Conservation status
- Least Concern (IUCN 3.1)

Scientific classification
- Kingdom: Animalia
- Phylum: Mollusca
- Class: Gastropoda
- Subclass: Caenogastropoda
- Order: incertae sedis
- Family: Thiaridae
- Genus: Sermyla
- Species: S. riquetii

Binomial name
- Sermyla riquetii (Grateloup, 1840)

Synonyms
- Melania harpula Dunker, 1844 (junior synonym); † Melania herklotsi K. Martin, 1879 (junior subjective synonym); Melania mitra Dunker, 1844; Melania riquetii Grateloup, 1840 (in legends as "riqueti"); Melania sculpta Souleyet, 1852; Melania semicostata Philippi, 1847 (invalid: junior homonym of Melania semicostata Conrad, 1835); Melania tornatella I. Lea & H. C. Lea, 1851 (junior synonym); Melanoides riqueti (Grateloup, 1840); Sermyla kowloonensis S.-F. Chen, 1943 (junior synonym); Sermyla tornatella (I. Lea & H. C. Lea, 1851); Thiara riqueti (Grateloup, 1840)

= Sermyla riquetii =

Species of gastropod

Sermyla riquetii is a species of brackish water and freshwater snail with an operculum, an aquatic gastropod mollusk in the family Thiaridae. (Note, in many works the name is spelt "riqueti")

== Ecology ==
The pollution tolerance value is 3 (on scale 0–10; 0 is the best water quality, 10 is the worst water quality).
