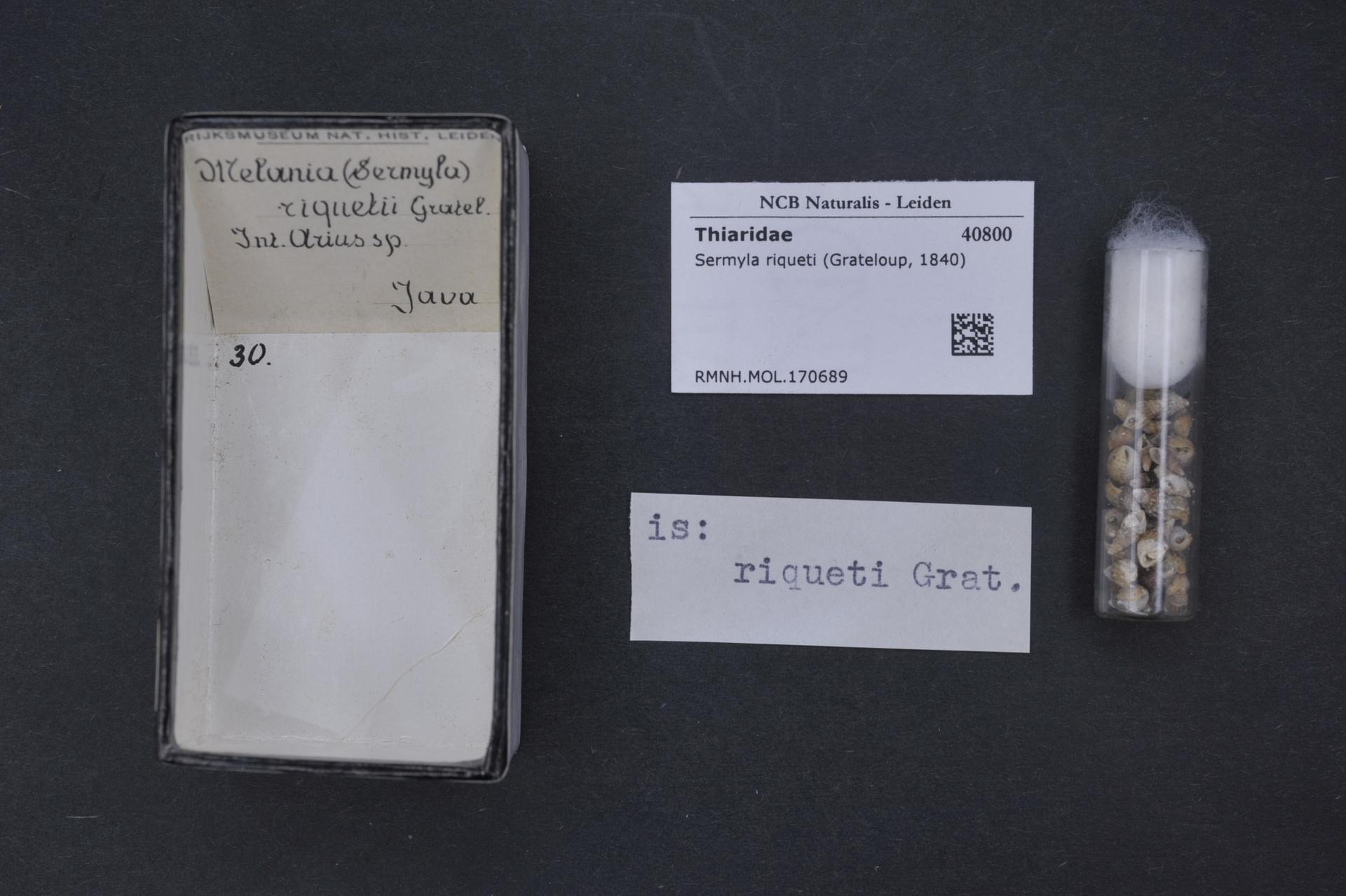
- Sermyla riqueti shells

Scientific classification
- Kingdom: Animalia
- Phylum: Mollusca
- Class: Gastropoda
- Subclass: Caenogastropoda
- Order: incertae sedis
- Superfamily: Cerithioidea
- Family: Thiaridae
- Genus: Sermyla; H. Adams & A. Adams, 1854

Type species
- Melania mitra Dunker, 1844

Synonyms
- Melanella (Sermyla) H. Adams & A. Adams, 1854 (original rank); Melania (Sermyla) H. Adams & A. Adams, 1854; Sermylasma Iredale, 1943

= Sermyla (gastropod) =

Genus of gastropods

Sermyla is a genus of brackish water and freshwater snails with an operculum, an aquatic gastropod mollusks in the subfamily Thiarinae of the family Thiaridae.

== Species ==
Species within the genus Sermyla include:

- Sermyla carbonata (Reeve, 1859)
- Sermyla huberi Thach, 2021
- Sermyla kupaensis Lentge-Maaß, Neiber, Gimnich & Glaubrecht, 2020
- Sermyla onca (A. Adams & Angas, 1864)
- Sermyla riquetii (Grateloup, 1840) (Note: see alternative spelling "riqueti" in multiple sources; also, see synonym Melania sculpta Souleyet, 1852 = "Sermyla sculpta" (Souleyet, 1832))

Synonyms

- Sermyla chaperi de Morgan, 1885: synonym of Brotia episcopalis (I. Lea & H. C. Lea, 1851) (a junior synonym)
- Sermyla kowloonensis S.-F. Chen, 1943: synonym of Sermyla riquetii (Grateloup, 1840) (junior synonym)
- Sermyla perakensis de Morgan, 1885: synonym of Brotia episcopalis (I. Lea & H. C. Lea, 1851) (junior synonym)
- Sermyla tornatella (I. Lea & H. C. Lea, 1851): synonym of Sermyla riquetii (Grateloup, 1840)
- Sermyla venustula (Brot, 1877): synonym of Sermyla carbonata (Reeve, 1859)
