= Melanoides polymorpha =

Conservation status
- Least Concern (IUCN 3.1)

Scientific classification
- Kingdom: Animalia
- Phylum: Mollusca
- Class: Gastropoda
- Subclass: Caenogastropoda
- Family: Thiaridae
- Genus: Melanoides
- Species: M. polymorpha

Binomial name
- Melanoides polymorpha (E. A. Smith, 1877)

Synonyms
- Melania polymorpha E. A. Smith, 1877; Melania tanganyicensis E. A. Smith, 1880

Species of gastropod

Melanoides polymorpha is a species of freshwater snail with a gill and an operculum, an aquatic gastropod mollusk in the family Thiaridae.

This species is endemic to Lake Malawi and is found in Malawi, Tanzania, and Mozambique. It is very abundant throughout the lake in the littoral soft sediments.
