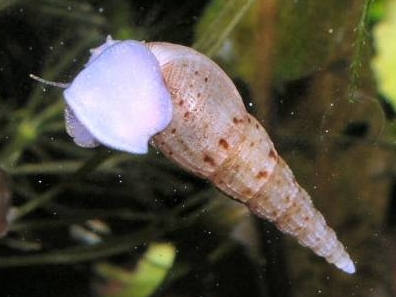
- A live individual of Red-rimmed melania, Melanoides tuberculata, crawling on the glass of an aquarium

Scientific classification
- Kingdom: Animalia
- Phylum: Mollusca
- Class: Gastropoda
- Subclass: Caenogastropoda
- Order: incertae sedis
- Superfamily: Cerithioidea
- Family: Thiaridae; Gill, 1871 (1823)

Synonyms
- Melaniidae Children, 1823; Melanoididae Ihering, 1909

= Thiaridae =

Thiaridae Temporal range: Lower Cretaceous or Eocene-Recent

Family of gastropods

Thiaridae, common name thiarids or trumpet snails, is a family of tropical freshwater snails with an operculum, aquatic gastropod mollusks in the superfamily Cerithioidea.

== Taxonomy ==
Many species of freshwater snails that are characterized by a turreted shell were originally placed within the genus Melania Lamarck, 1799. This genus as delimited by authors of the late 19th and early 20th century contained hundreds of species, and was successively split into different groupings. Over time, infrageneric groups (subgenera) were elevated to the rank of independent genera and the genus Melania was elevated to the rank of a family, Melanidae.

However, the genus name Melania Lamarck, 1799 was demonstrated to be a junior synonym of the genus name Thiara Röding, 1798. Consequently, the family had to be renamed Thiaridae. Moreover, the Melanidae as traditionally circumscribed were found to be polyphyletic, containing species from many different groups, which were successively recognized as distinct families, such as the Pachychilidae, Semisulcospiridae, Pleuroceridae, Melanopsidae, and Paludomidae. Therefore, the Thiaridae as currently circumscribed contain fewer species than the Melaniidae.

== Distribution ==
This family of snails is found worldwide, and are particularly diverse in the tropics and subtropics.

== Ecology ==
These snails are freshwater inhabitants of temperate and warm zones.

Thiaridae are partly viviparous, partly ovoviviparous. Many, but not all species are parthenogenetic.

== Genera ==
Genera in the family Thiaridae include:

Subfamily Thiarinae Gill, 1871 (1823)

- Balanocochlis Fischer, 1885
  - Balanocochlis glandiformis
  - Balanocochlis glans
- Culenmelania Z.-X. Qian, J. Yang, Y. Lu & J. He, 2012
- † Kumania Ota, 1960
- Melanoides Olivier, 1804
- Mieniplotia Low & Tan, 2014
- Neoradina Brandt, 1974
- † Pachymelania E. A. Smith, 1893: synonym of † Pachychiloides Wenz, 1939 (junior homonym of Pachymelania E. A. Smith, 1893; Pachychiloides Wenz, 1939 is a replacement name)
- Plotia Röding, 1798: synonym of Pyramidella Lamarck, 1799
- Plotiopsis Brot, 1874 - Plotiopsis balonnensis (Conrad, 1850)
- Ripalania Iredale, 1943
- Sermyla Adams, 1854
- Stenomelania Fischer, 1885
- Tarebia H. Adams & A. Adams, 1854
- Thiara Röding, 1798 - type genus of the family Thiaridae, synonym: Melania Lamarck, 1799

Not assigned to a subfamily

- † Brotiopsis K. Suzuki, 1943
- † Coptostylus F. Sandberger, 1872
- † Cornetia Munier-Chalmas in Fischer et al., 1885
- † Ellinoria Van Damme & Pickford, 2003
- Fijidoma Morrison, 1952
- † Hannatoma Olsson, 1931
- † Heynderycxia Van Damme & Pickford, 2003
- † Juramelanatria Bandel, 1991
- † Juramelanoides Bandel, 1991
- Longiverena Pilsbry & Olsson, 1935
- † Melabrina Stache, 1880
- † Melanotarebia Bandel & Kowalke, 1997
- † Pseudopyrgula Wenz, 1928
- † Ptychomelania Sacco, 1895
- † Sengoeria Harzhauser, Mandic, Büyükmeriç, Neubauer, Kadolsky & Landau, 2016
- † Sinomelania Yen, 1936
- † Siragimelania Suzuki, 1940
- † Tianjinospira Youluo, 1978
- Verena H. Adams & A. Adams, 1854
- † Yoshimonia Ota, 1960
