= Opsaridium ubangiense =

Conservation status
- Least Concern (IUCN 3.1)

Scientific classification
- Kingdom: Animalia
- Phylum: Chordata
- Class: Actinopterygii
- Order: Cypriniformes
- Family: Danionidae
- Subfamily: Chedrinae
- Genus: Opsaridium
- Species: O. ubangiense

Binomial name
- Opsaridium ubangiense Pellegrin, 1901

Species of fish

Opsaridium ubangiense is a species of ray-finned fish in the family Danionidae. It is found in coastal basins from Cameroon to the Republic of the Congo. It is also found in upper tributaries of Lake Chad and the Benue River, and the Congo River basin.
