= Chelaethiops minutus =

Conservation status
- Least Concern (IUCN 3.1)

Scientific classification
- Kingdom: Animalia
- Phylum: Chordata
- Class: Actinopterygii
- Order: Cypriniformes
- Family: Danionidae
- Subfamily: Chedrinae
- Genus: Chelaethiops
- Species: C. minutus

Binomial name
- Chelaethiops minutus (Boulenger, 1906)

Synonyms
- Neobola minuta Boulenger, 1906

Species of fish

Chelaethiops minutus is a species of ray-finned fish in the family Cyprinidae. It is endemic to Lake Tanganyika and its outflow, the Lukuga River, and is found in Burundi, Democratic Republic of the Congo, Tanzania, and Zambia.

Juvenile C. minutus, i.e. those fish up to 75mm in length, live in the shallow waters near the shore. Max Poll discovered that the adult fish inhabit the pelagic zone and grow to 106mm. The adults are frequently caught in association with kapenta, the freshwater clupeids of Lake Tanganyika. In the light of the fishing lamps, C. minutus and kapenta are readily identifiable from their behaviour. Kapenta form dense schools around one metre below the surface, while C. minutus swim just below the surface and do not form schools. This species feeds on wind blown insects which have fallen onto the surface. This is the only cyprinid in the Lake Tanganyika basin which has specialised in feeding on insects from the surface, and this specialisation has enabled it to colonise the deeper waters of the open lake.

Chelaethiops minutus is widespread in Lake Tanganyika, and is a commonly caught species, but is not regarded as a species of commercial importance. It may be locally threatened by water pollution, but there are no widespread threats.

The generic name is derived from the name of the Asian genus Chela, with the addition of aethiops in reference to the African origin of the genus, and so means "Chela from Africa". The specific name minutus refers to this species' small size.
