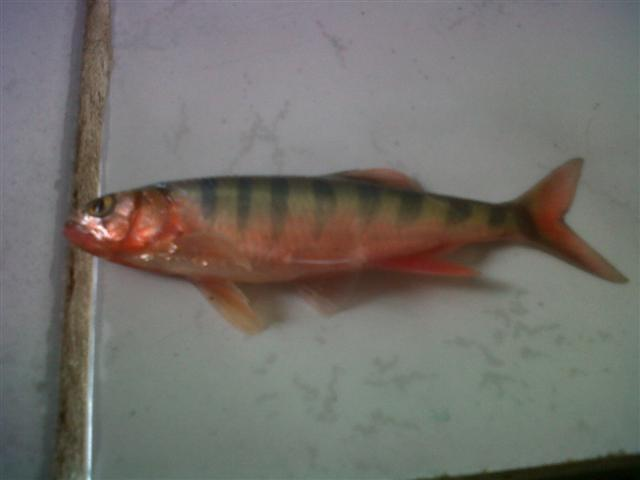
- Opsaridium peringueyi

Conservation status
- Least Concern (IUCN 3.1)

Scientific classification
- Kingdom: Animalia
- Phylum: Chordata
- Class: Actinopterygii
- Order: Cypriniformes
- Family: Danionidae
- Subfamily: Chedrinae
- Genus: Opsaridium
- Species: O. peringueyi

Binomial name
- Opsaridium peringueyi (Gilchrist & W. W. Thompson, 1913)

Synonyms
- Barilius peringueyi Gilchrist & W. W. Thompson, 1913

= Southern barred minnow =

Species of fish

The southern barred minnow (Opsaridium peringueyi) is a species of freshwater ray-finned fish belonging to the family Danionidae, the danios or danionins. This species is found in Mozambique, South Africa, and Eswatini.

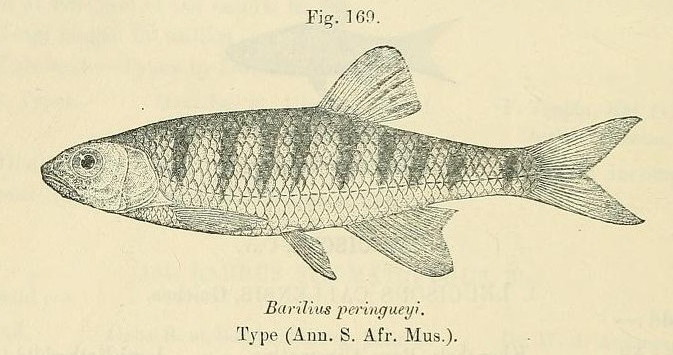
Barilius peringueyi

== Etymology ==
The fish is named in honor of French entomologist Louis Peringuey (1855–1924), the director of the South African Museum, in whose publication this species was described by the authors.
