= Raiamas nigeriensis =

Conservation status
- Least Concern (IUCN 3.1)

Scientific classification
- Kingdom: Animalia
- Phylum: Chordata
- Class: Actinopterygii
- Order: Cypriniformes
- Family: Danionidae
- Subfamily: Chedrinae
- Genus: Raiamas
- Species: R. nigeriensis

Binomial name
- Raiamas nigeriensis (Daget, 1959)

Synonyms
- Barilius nigeriensis Daget, 1959

Species of fish

Raiamas nigeriensis, the aeroplane fish, is a species of freshwater ray-finned fish belonging to the family Danionidae, the danios or danionins. This species is found in West Africa.
