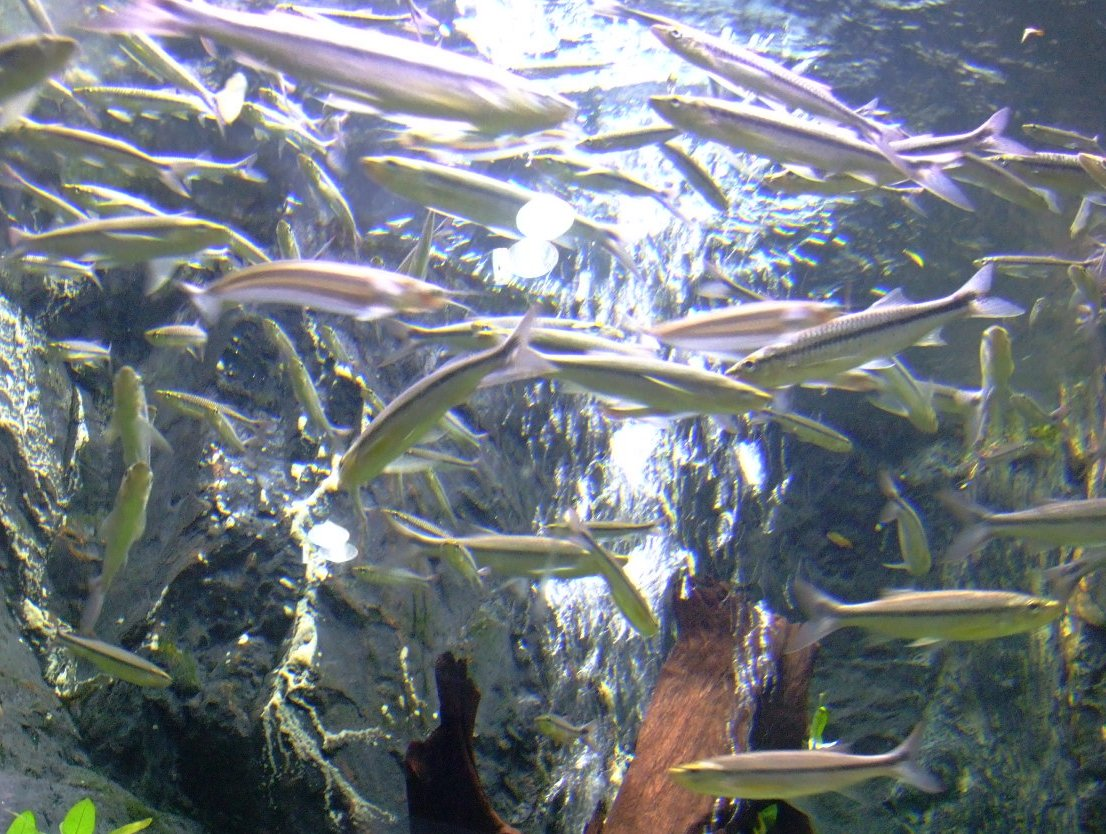
- School at Bueng Chawak Aquarium in Doem Bang Nang Buat District, Thailand

Conservation status
- Least Concern (IUCN 3.1)

Scientific classification
- Kingdom: Animalia
- Phylum: Chordata
- Class: Actinopterygii
- Division: Teleostei
- Order: Cypriniformes
- Family: Danionidae
- Subfamily: Chedrinae
- Genus: Luciosoma
- Species: L. bleekeri

Binomial name
- Luciosoma bleekeri Steindachner, 1878

Synonyms
- Luciosoma harmandi Sauvage, 1880

= Shark minnow =

Species of fish

Shark minnow (Luciosoma bleekeri; Chinese: 布氏梭大口魚, Thai: ปลาซิวอ้าว, pla sio ao, Khmer: តែីដងដវ, trey dang dau or តែីបង្កួយ, trey bangkuy) is a species of small ray-finned fish belonging to the family Danionidae. This fish is found in Southeast Asia from the Mae Klong River to the Mekong. It lives mainly in rivers, moving into flooded forests and fields during the floods and back into the river as the floods recede. It usually swims close to the surface in schools of many individuals. It is one of the most abundant of the different types of minnow-sized fishes known as pla sio in Thailand.

== Etymology ==
The fish is named in honor of Dutch army surgeon and ichthyologist Pieter Bleeker (1819–1878).

== Uses ==
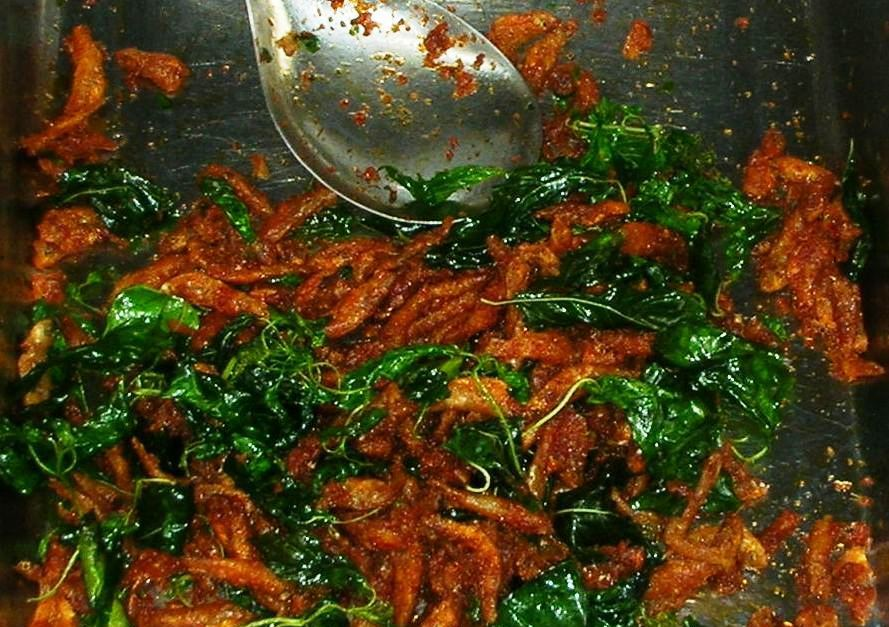
Fried shark minnow (Pla sio ao), a specialty of Thai cuisine

This small fish is important in the cuisine of Thailand, Laos, Cambodia and Vietnam where it is seasonally found in great numbers. It is commonly deep-fried, pickled or fermented as pla ra, padaek and prahok, as well as salted and dried. It is eaten also raw in Lao and Isan cuisine.

== See also ==
- Cambodian cuisine
- Lao cuisine
- List of Thai ingredients
