= Dwarf sanjika =

Conservation status
- Data Deficient (IUCN 3.1)

Scientific classification
- Kingdom: Animalia
- Phylum: Chordata
- Class: Actinopterygii
- Order: Cypriniformes
- Family: Danionidae
- Subfamily: Chedrinae
- Genus: Opsaridium
- Species: O. tweddleorum

Binomial name
- Opsaridium tweddleorum P. H. Skelton, 1996

Species of fish

The dwarf sanjika (Opsaridium tweddleorum) is an African freshwater fish species in the family Danionidae. It is found in Malawi and Mozambique, living in Lake Malawi and the lower Zambezi River.

== Size ==
This species reaches a length of 11.0 cm (4.3 in).

== Etymology ==
The fish is named in honor of Denis (b. 1949) and Sharon Tweddle, a husband and wife, because of their contributions of study specimens, and color slides to the study of fish of Malawi.
