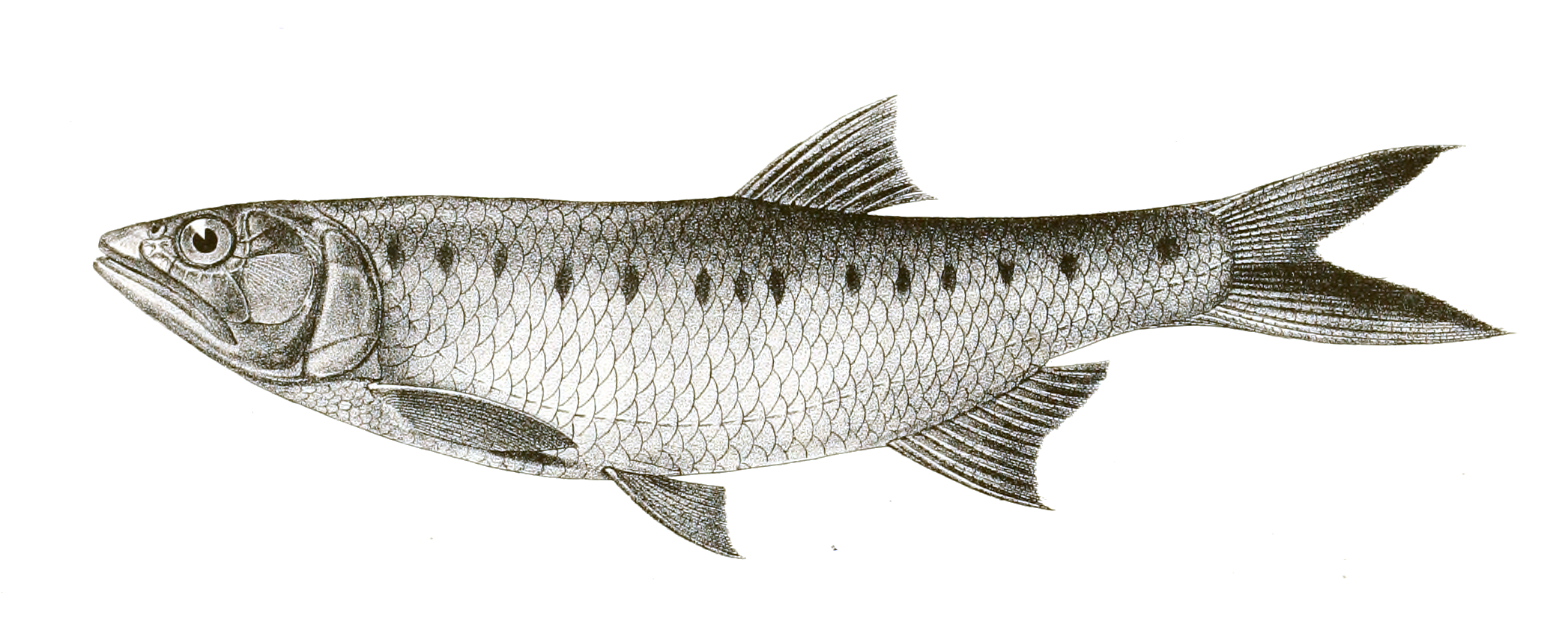

Conservation status
- Least Concern (IUCN 3.1)

Scientific classification
- Kingdom: Animalia
- Phylum: Chordata
- Class: Actinopterygii
- Order: Cypriniformes
- Family: Danionidae
- Subfamily: Chedrinae
- Genus: Raiamas
- Species: R. guttatus

Binomial name
- Raiamas guttatus (F. Day, 1870)

Synonyms
- Opsarius guttatus Day, 1870; Barilius guttatus (Day, 1870); Bola harmandi Sauvage, 1880; Barilius harmandi (Sauvage, 1880); Luciosoma fasciata Yang & Hwang, 1964

= Burmese trout =

Species of fish

The Burmese trout (Raiamas guttatus) is a species of ray-finned fish in the genus Raiamas.

They are found in the Irrawaddy, Mekong, Chao Phraya, Salween River basins and also in the northern Malay Peninsula.
