= Opsaridium splendens =

Conservation status
- Data Deficient (IUCN 3.1)

Scientific classification
- Kingdom: Animalia
- Phylum: Chordata
- Class: Actinopterygii
- Order: Cypriniformes
- Family: Danionidae
- Subfamily: Chedrinae
- Genus: Opsaridium
- Species: O. splendens

Binomial name
- Opsaridium splendens Taverne & De Vos, 1997

Species of fish

Opsaridium splendens is a species of ray-finned fish in the family Danionidae found in Burundi and Tanzania. Its natural habitat is rivers. It is threatened by habitat loss.
