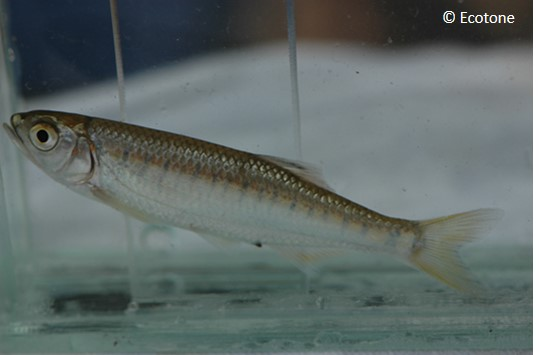

Conservation status
- Data Deficient (IUCN 3.1)

Scientific classification
- Kingdom: Animalia
- Phylum: Chordata
- Class: Actinopterygii
- Order: Cypriniformes
- Family: Danionidae
- Subfamily: Chedrinae
- Genus: Raiamas
- Species: R. scarciensis

Binomial name
- Raiamas scarciensis Howes & Teugels, 1989

= Raiamas scarciensis =

Species of fish

Raiamas scarciensis is a species of freshwater ray-finned fish belonging to the family Danionidae, the danios or danionins. This species is found in the lower reaches of the Little Scarcies River and Waanje River in Sierra Leone.
