= Raiamas salmolucius =

Conservation status
- Least Concern (IUCN 3.1)

Scientific classification
- Kingdom: Animalia
- Phylum: Chordata
- Class: Actinopterygii
- Order: Cypriniformes
- Family: Danionidae
- Subfamily: Chedrinae
- Genus: Raiamas
- Species: R. salmolucius

Binomial name
- Raiamas salmolucius (Nichols & Griscom, 1917)

Synonyms
- Barilius salmolucius Nichols & Griscom, 1917

Species of fish

Raiamas salmolucius is a species of freshwater ray-finned fish belonging to the family Danionidae, the danios or danionins. This species is found in the Congo River drainage in Africa,
