= Raiamas levequei =

Conservation status
- Vulnerable (IUCN 3.1)

Scientific classification
- Kingdom: Animalia
- Phylum: Chordata
- Class: Actinopterygii
- Order: Cypriniformes
- Family: Danionidae
- Subfamily: Chedrinae
- Genus: Raiamas
- Species: R. levequei

Binomial name
- Raiamas levequei Howes & Teugels, 1989

Species of fish

Raiamas levequei is a species of ray-finned fish in the genus Raiamas which is found in Guinea.

== Etymology ==
The fish is named in honor of French ichthyologist-hydrobiologist Christian Lévêque, of ORSTOM (Office de la Recherche Scientifique et Technique d'Outre-Mer), who collected the holotype specimen.
