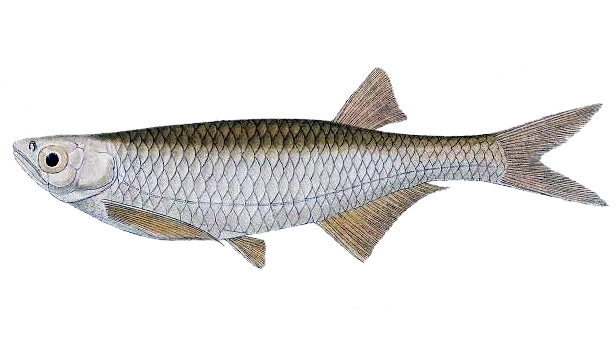

Conservation status
- Least Concern (IUCN 3.1)

Scientific classification
- Kingdom: Animalia
- Phylum: Chordata
- Class: Actinopterygii
- Order: Cypriniformes
- Family: Danionidae
- Subfamily: Chedrinae
- Genus: Chelaethiops
- Species: C. bibie

Binomial name
- Chelaethiops bibie (de Joannis, 1835)

Synonyms.
- Leuciscus bibie de Joannis, 1835; Barilius bibie (de Joannis, 1835); Pelecus bibie (de Joannis, 1835); Chelaethiops elongatus brevianalis Daget, 1954; Chelaethiops brevianalis lerei Blache & Miton, 1961

= Lake Turkana sardine =

Species of fish

The Lake Turkana sardine (Chelaethiops bibie) is an African species of freshwater ray-finned fish belonging to the family Danionidae. It is found in the Nile River and Webi Shebeli, and in the Niger, Bénoué and Volta basin.
