= Opsaridium microcephalum =

Conservation status
- Least Concern (IUCN 3.1)

Scientific classification
- Kingdom: Animalia
- Phylum: Chordata
- Class: Actinopterygii
- Order: Cypriniformes
- Family: Danionidae
- Subfamily: Chedrinae
- Genus: Opsaridium
- Species: O. microcephalum

Binomial name
- Opsaridium microcephalum (Günther, 1864)

Synonyms
- Pelotrophus microcephalus Günther, 1864; Barilius microcephalus (Günther, 1864); Barilius guentheri Boulenger, 1897

Species of fish

Opsaridium microcephalum is a species of ray-finned fish in the family Danionidae found in Malawi, Mozambique, and Tanzania. Its natural habitats are rivers and freshwater lakes.
