= Chelaethiops elongatus =

Conservation status
- Least Concern (IUCN 3.1)

Scientific classification
- Kingdom: Animalia
- Phylum: Chordata
- Class: Actinopterygii
- Order: Cypriniformes
- Family: Danionidae
- Subfamily: Chedrinae
- Genus: Chelaethiops
- Species: C. elongatus

Binomial name
- Chelaethiops elongatus Boulenger, 1899

Species of fish

Chelaethiops elongatus is an African species of freshwater fish in the family Danionidae. It is found in the Congo River basin.
