= Barred minnow =

Conservation status
- Least Concern (IUCN 3.1)

Scientific classification
- Kingdom: Animalia
- Phylum: Chordata
- Class: Actinopterygii
- Order: Cypriniformes
- Family: Danionidae
- Subfamily: Chedrinae
- Genus: Opsaridium
- Species: O. zambezense

Binomial name
- Opsaridium zambezense (Peters, 1852)

Synonyms
- Barilius zambezensis Günther, 1868; Leuciscus zambezensis Peters 1852; Labeobarbus zambezensis (Peters, 1852)

Species of fish

The barred minnow (Opsaridium zambezense) is a species of freshwater ray-finned fish belonging to the family Danionidae, the danios or danionins. This species is found in river systems from the Democratic Republic of Congo, south to Namibia, Zimbabwe and far northern areas of South Africa.
