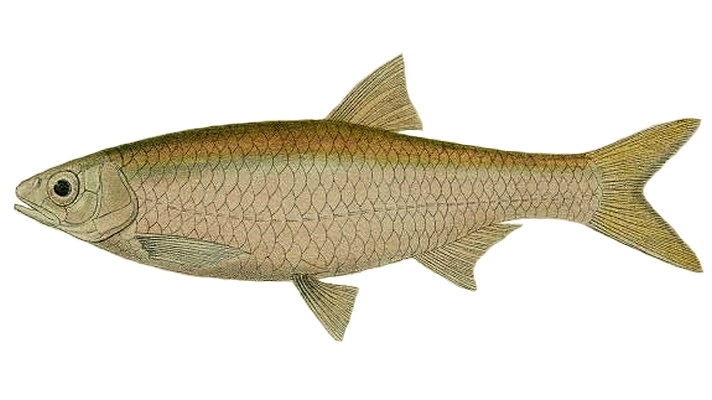

Conservation status
- Least Concern (IUCN 3.1)

Scientific classification
- Kingdom: Animalia
- Phylum: Chordata
- Class: Actinopterygii
- Order: Cypriniformes
- Family: Danionidae
- Subfamily: Chedrinae
- Genus: Leptocypris
- Species: L. niloticus

Binomial name
- Leptocypris niloticus de Joannis, 1835

Synonyms
- Alburnus alexandrinus Steindachner, 1893; Alburnus niloticus (de Joannis, 1835); Barilius niloticus (de Joannis, 1835); Barilius thebensis (de Joannis, 1835); Leuciscus niloticus de Joannis, 1835; Leuciscus thebensis de Joannis, 1835; Opsarius thebensis (de Joannis, 1835)

= Nile minnow =

Species of fish

The Nile minnow (Leptocypris niloticus) is a species of freshwater ray-finned fish belonging to the family Danionidae. This fish is found in the Nile, Omo, Niger, Bénoué, Volta, and Senegal Rivers, and the Lake Chad basin. It was described by Léon-Daniel de Joannis in 1835.
