= Opsaridium leleupi =

Conservation status
- Data Deficient (IUCN 3.1)

Scientific classification
- Kingdom: Animalia
- Phylum: Chordata
- Class: Actinopterygii
- Order: Cypriniformes
- Family: Danionidae
- Subfamily: Chedrinae
- Genus: Opsaridium
- Species: O. leleupi

Binomial name
- Opsaridium leleupi (Matthes, 1965)

Synonyms
- Barilius leleupi Matthes, 1965

Species of fish

Opsaridium leleupi is a species of ray-finned fish in the family Danionidae. It is found in the upper Lualaba River in Democratic Republic of the Congo.

== Etymology ==
The fish is named in honor of entomologist Narcisse Leleup (1912–2001), of the Institut pour la Recherche Scientifique en Afrique Centrale, who collected the holotype specimen .
