= Chelaethiops congicus =

Conservation status
- Least Concern (IUCN 3.1)

Scientific classification
- Kingdom: Animalia
- Phylum: Chordata
- Class: Actinopterygii
- Order: Cypriniformes
- Family: Danionidae
- Subfamily: Chedrinae
- Genus: Chelaethiops
- Species: C. congicus

Binomial name
- Chelaethiops congicus (Nichols & Griscom, 1917)

Synonyms
- Chelaethiops katangae Poll, 1948; Engraulicypris congicus Nichols & Griscom, 1917; Engraulicypris congicus congicus (Nichols & Griscom, 1917); Engraulicypris luluae Fowler, 1930; Engraulicypris moeruensis (Boulenger, 1915)

Species of fish

Chelaethiops congicus is an African species of freshwater fish in the family Danionidae. It is found in the Congo River basin and in the Lake Tanganyika basin.
