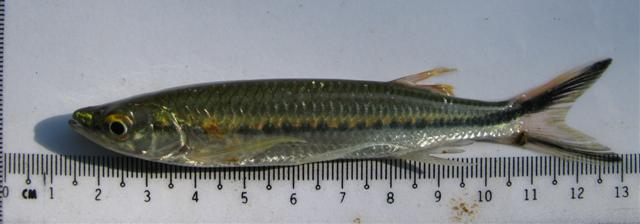

Conservation status
- Least Concern (IUCN 3.1)

Scientific classification
- Kingdom: Animalia
- Phylum: Chordata
- Class: Actinopterygii
- Order: Cypriniformes
- Family: Danionidae
- Subfamily: Chedrinae
- Genus: Luciosoma
- Species: L. setigerum

Binomial name
- Luciosoma setigerum Valenciennes, 1842

= Luciosoma setigerum =

Species of fish

Luciosoma setigerum species of freshwater ray-finned fish belonging to the family Danionidae, the danios or danionins. This fish is found on the Malay Peninsula.
