= Raiamas longirostris =

Conservation status
- Data Deficient (IUCN 3.1)

Scientific classification
- Kingdom: Animalia
- Phylum: Chordata
- Class: Actinopterygii
- Order: Cypriniformes
- Family: Danionidae
- Subfamily: Chedrinae
- Genus: Raiamas
- Species: R. longirostris

Binomial name
- Raiamas longirostris (Boulenger, 1902)

Synonyms
- Barilius longirostris Boulenger, 1902

Species of fish

Raiamas longirostris is a species of ray-finned fish in the genus Raiamas. It is a freshwater fish and is only known from the type locality Ubangui at Brazzaville, Central Congo River basin, although the species may be more widespread.
