= Raiamas buchholzi =

Conservation status
- Least Concern (IUCN 3.1)

Scientific classification
- Kingdom: Animalia
- Phylum: Chordata
- Class: Actinopterygii
- Order: Cypriniformes
- Family: Danionidae
- Subfamily: Chedrinae
- Genus: Raiamas
- Species: R. buchholzi

Binomial name
- Raiamas buchholzi (W. K. H. Peters, 1876)

Synonyms
- Opsaridium buchholzi Peters, 1876; Barilius buchholzi (Peters, 1876); Opsaridium fasciatum Vaillant, 1886; Barilius kingsleyae Boulenger, 1899

Species of fish

Raiamas buchholzi is a species of ray-finned fish in the genus Raiamas.

== Etymology ==
The fish is named in honor of the German physician, zoologist and explorer Reinhold Buchholz (1837–1876), who discovered this species in his travels.
