= Leptocypris weynsii =

Conservation status
- Least Concern (IUCN 3.1)

Scientific classification
- Kingdom: Animalia
- Phylum: Chordata
- Class: Actinopterygii
- Order: Cypriniformes
- Family: Danionidae
- Subfamily: Chedrinae
- Genus: Leptocypris
- Species: L. weynsii

Binomial name
- Leptocypris weynsii (Boulenger, 1899)

Synonyms
- Barilius weynsii Boulenger, 1899

Species of fish

Leptocypris weynsii s a species of freshwater ray-finned fish belonging to the family Danionidae. This fish is found in the lower, central and upper Congo River basin and Pool Malebo in the Democratic Republic of Congo and the Central African Republic.

== Etymology ==
The fish is named in honor of Belgian explorer Auguste F. G. Weyns (1854–1944), who was the one who collected the holotype specimen.
