= Opsaridium boweni =

Conservation status
- Data Deficient (IUCN 3.1)

Scientific classification
- Kingdom: Animalia
- Phylum: Chordata
- Class: Actinopterygii
- Order: Cypriniformes
- Family: Danionidae
- Subfamily: Chedrinae
- Genus: Opsaridium
- Species: O. boweni

Binomial name
- Opsaridium boweni Fowler, 1930

Species of fish

Opsaridium boweni is a species of ray-finned fish in the family Danionidae. It is found in the Lulua River in Democratic Republic of the Congo.

== Etymology ==
The fish is named in honor of ornithologist Wilfrid Wedgwood Bowen (1899–1987), who collected the holotype specimen and several others which he obtained while a member of the Gray African Expedition.
