= Lake salmon =

Conservation status
- Vulnerable (IUCN 3.1)

Scientific classification
- Kingdom: Animalia
- Phylum: Chordata
- Class: Actinopterygii
- Order: Cypriniformes
- Family: Danionidae
- Subfamily: Chedrinae
- Genus: Opsaridium
- Species: O. microlepis

Binomial name
- Opsaridium microlepis (Günther, 1864)

Synonyms
- Pelotrophus microlepis Günther, 1864; Barilius microlepis (Günther, 1864); Barilius tanganicae Boulenger, 1900

Species of fish

The lake salmon or mpasa (Opsaridium microlepis) is an African species of freshwater fish, endemic to Lake Malawi, in the family Danionidae found in Malawi, Mozambique, and Tanzania. Its natural habitats are rivers and freshwater lakes.

== Description ==
It is a silvery fish which resembles trout of the family Salmonidae and lacks the pink or orange coloured fins of many of its congeners. They can grow to up to 4 kg (8.8 lb) in weight and 47 cm (19 in) in total length The larger adults are plain coloured while the juveniles have vertical dark bars along the body which they lose as they grow.

== Habitat and ecology ==
The lake salmon occurs in the pelagic zone of Lake Malawi, over sandy substrates. The juvenile fish stay close inshore near the mouths of the tributary rivers. The adults feed on small pelagic fishes, especially Engraulicypris sardella, while the juveniles feed on plankton, insects and other small organic matter. During the rainy season the adult fish migrate up the tributary rivers from the lake to spawn, this mainly takes place at night in shallow, well-oxygenated, flowing waters over gravel substrates with no silt. there is an extended spawning period which starts with the onset of the rains and continues after the rains, from May to October. The young remain in the rivers until they have grown somewhat and are able to return to the lake.

== Conservation ==
The lake salmon is threatened by overfishing and there are very high mortality rates in adult fish during the spawning season as the rivers are often totally blocked with weirs and with gill nets which prevent the fish from running upstream, especially during years of low rainfall. Other threats include deliberate poisoning and the deterioration of the spawning grounds due to siltation from soil erosion caused by deforestation and agriculture, which also causes habitat deterioration as water is abstracted from the breeding streams for irrigation and this makes it difficult for the juveniles to return to the lake from the spawning areas. It is caught using ring nets and by angling.

The Bua River runs through the Nkhotakota Wildlife Reserve in central Malawi and this is the only river where the spawning grounds are protected because the surrounding woodlands are protected from clearing. The headwaters of another spawning river, the North Rukuru, are protected within the Nyika National Park but there is increasing deforestation between the park and the spawning grounds. The Linthipe River is a major spawning river and it is unprotected being polluted with untreated sewage from the city of Lilongwe. The condition of the spawning rivers in Tanzania and Mozambique is not known.
