= Raiamas intermedius =

Conservation status
- Least Concern (IUCN 3.1)

Scientific classification
- Kingdom: Animalia
- Phylum: Chordata
- Class: Actinopterygii
- Order: Cypriniformes
- Family: Danionidae
- Subfamily: Chedrinae
- Genus: Raiamas
- Species: R. intermedius

Binomial name
- Raiamas intermedius Boulenger, 1915

Synonyms
- Barbus luapulae Fowler, 1958; Barbus intermedius (Boulenger, 1915); Barilius intermedius Boulenger, 1915

Species of fish

Raiamas intermedius is a species of ray-finned fish in the genus Raiamas which is found in the Democratic Republic of the Congo and Zambia.
