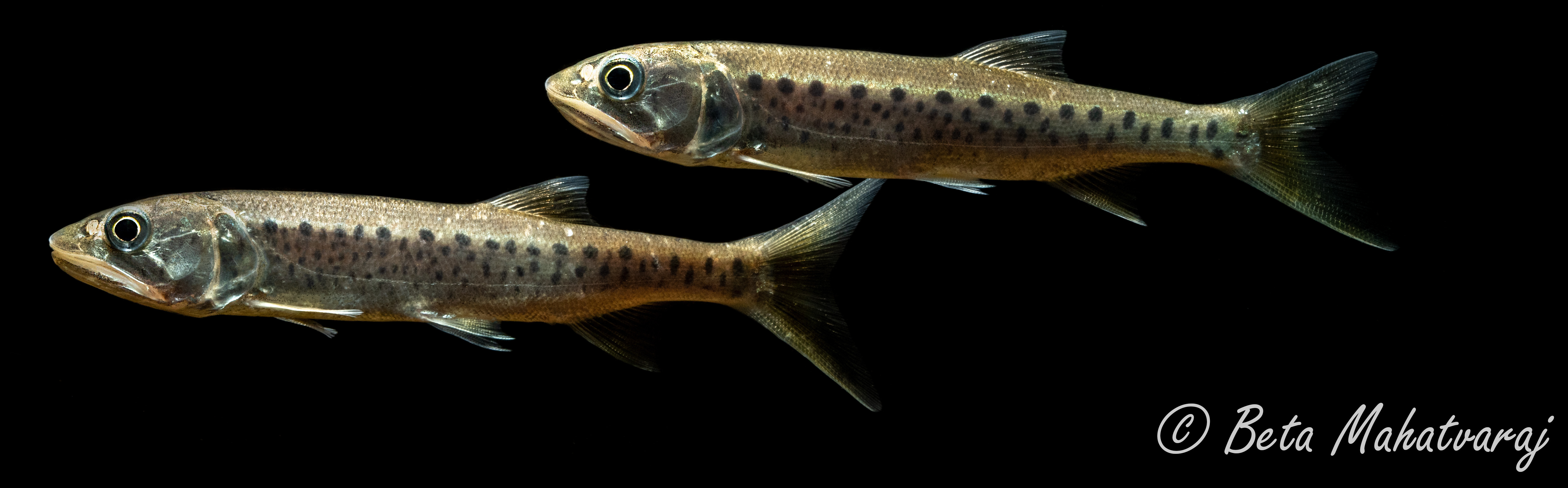

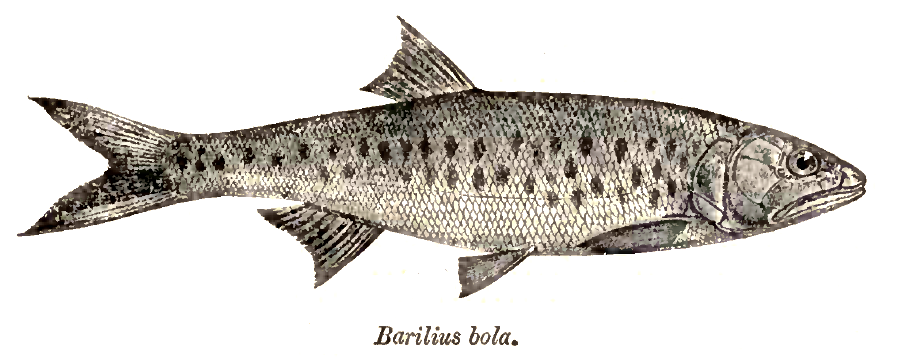

Conservation status
- Least Concern (IUCN 3.1)

Scientific classification
- Kingdom: Animalia
- Phylum: Chordata
- Class: Actinopterygii
- Order: Cypriniformes
- Family: Danionidae
- Subfamily: Chedrinae
- Genus: Raiamas
- Species: R. bola

Binomial name
- Raiamas bola (F. Hamilton, 1822)

Synonyms
- Cyprinus bola Hamilton, 1822; Barilius bola (Hamilton, 1822); Bola bola (Hamilton, 1822); Cyprinus goha Hamilton, 1822; Barilius goha (Hamilton, 1822); Bola goha (Hamilton, 1822); Opsarius goha (Hamilton, 1822); Opsarius gracilis McClelland, 1839; Opsarius megastomus McClelland, 1839; Leuciscus salmoides Blyth, 1858; Barilius jalkapoorei Shrestha, 1980; Barilius corbetti Tilak & Husain, 1980

= Trout barb =

Species of fish

The trout barb, or Indian trout (Raiamas bola) is a carp of the family Cyprinidae, which occurs in freshwaters around the Bay of Bengal.

== Description ==
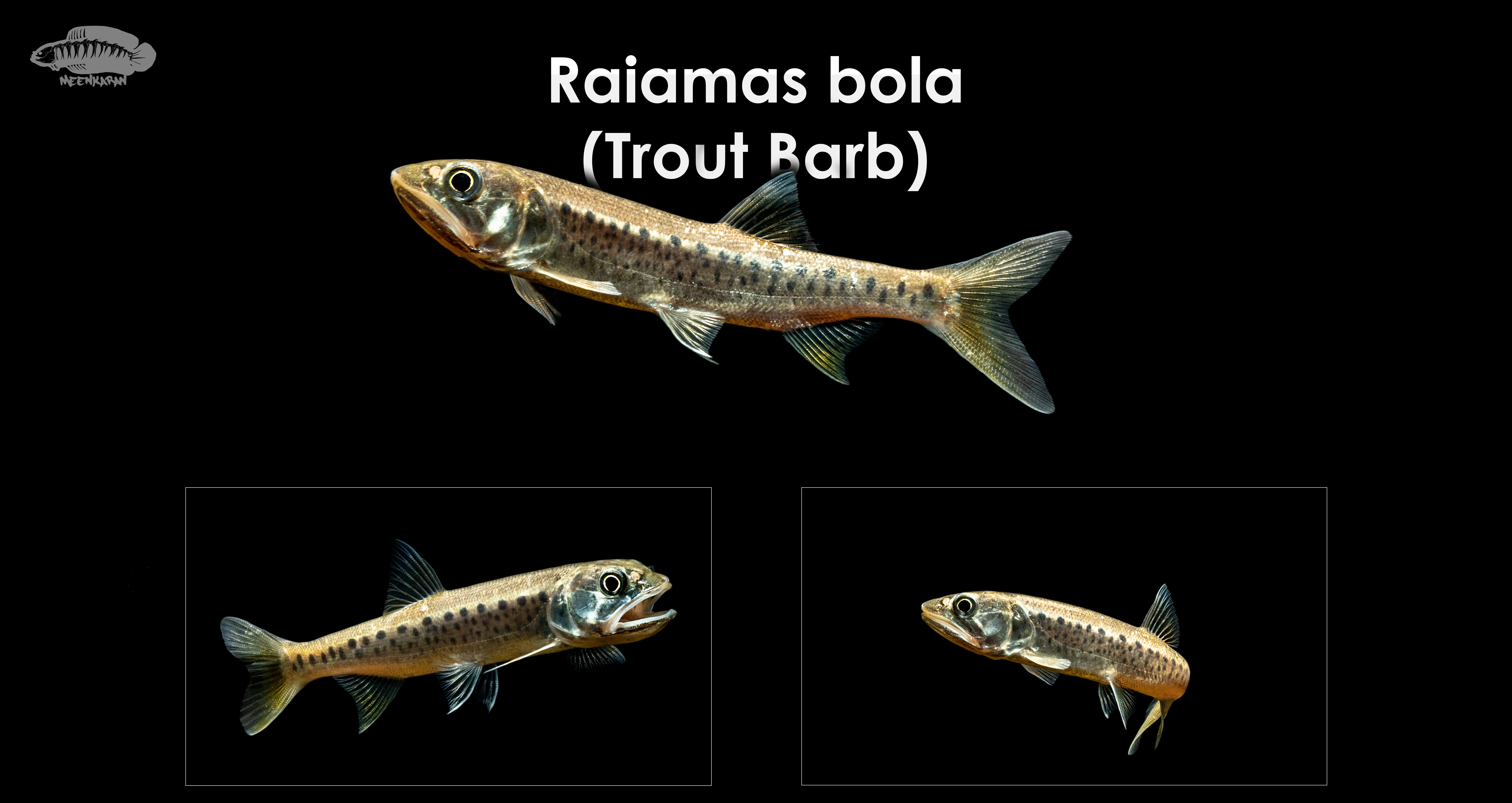
Trout barb

The trout barb has an elongated, slender body which is laterally compressed with a sharp snout. The juvenile fish possess a pair of rudimentary maxillary barbels but these are absent in the adults. It has very small scales and has 85-95 scales along its lateral line. It has a forked tail. The dorsal part of the body is greenish black, separated from the silvery flanks by a golden stripe running along the length of the body. The fins are yellowish in colour and there are a number of greenish blue spots on the body.

The maximum length is 35 cm and they grow up to 2.3 kg in weight.

== Distribution ==
The trout barb is found in the Indian states of Haryana, Himachal Pradesh, Uttar Pradesh, Bihar, Assam, Arunachal Pradesh, West Bengal and Orissa. It also occurs in Bangladesh, Nepal and Myanmar. Trout barbs were introduced into two lakes near Pune in 1926, where they subsequently successfully bred.

== Habitat and ecology ==
The trout barb is found in rivers and streams and also in ditches and canals. In India it prefers clear streams with rocky riverbeds. It breeds during early monsoon season, in June, spawning in heavily flooded areas. It is sexually mature at around three years old, during the spawning seasons the males become brighter and the skin on their flanks becomes rougher. The wide mouth and stream-lined body are adaptations for an actively predatory lifestyle.

== Conservation ==
The trout barb is listed as Least Concern by the IUCN but the population is thought to be declining due to illegal and destructive fishing methods.

== Fishing ==
The trout barb is said to have a delicate flavoured flesh and to make good sport for fly fishermen.
