= Apollo sharkminnow =

Conservation status
- Least Concern (IUCN 3.1)

Scientific classification
- Kingdom: Animalia
- Phylum: Chordata
- Class: Actinopterygii
- Order: Cypriniformes
- Family: Danionidae
- Subfamily: Chedrinae
- Genus: Luciosoma
- Species: L. spilopleura

Binomial name
- Luciosoma spilopleura Bleeker, 1855

Species of fish

The Apollo sharkminnow (Luciosoma spilopleura) species of freshwater ray-finned fish belonging to the family Danionidae, the danios or danionins. This fish is found in Thailand, Sumatra and Borneo.
