= Leptocypris guineensis =

Conservation status
- Least Concern (IUCN 3.1)

Scientific classification
- Kingdom: Animalia
- Phylum: Chordata
- Class: Actinopterygii
- Order: Cypriniformes
- Family: Danionidae
- Subfamily: Chedrinae
- Genus: Leptocypris
- Species: L. guineensis

Binomial name
- Leptocypris guineensis (Daget, 1962)

Synonyms
- Barilius guineensis Daget, 1962

Species of fish

Leptocypris guineensis species of freshwater ray-finned fish belonging to the family Danionidae. This fish is found in Atlantic slope drainages of the Guinean mountain ranges.
