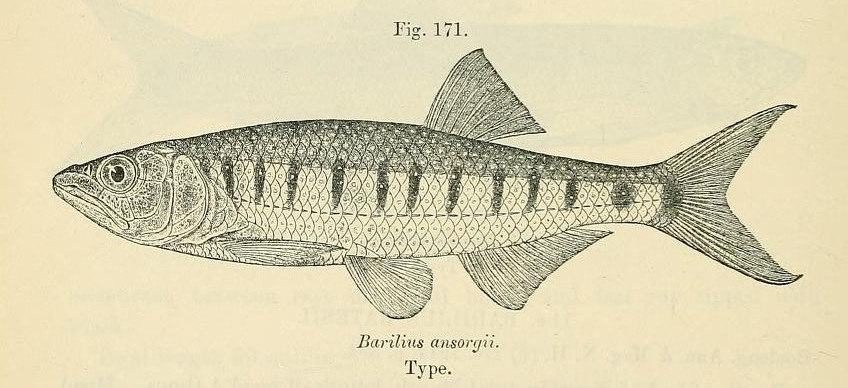
- Barilius ansorgii

Conservation status
- Data Deficient (IUCN 3.1)

Scientific classification
- Kingdom: Animalia
- Phylum: Chordata
- Class: Actinopterygii
- Order: Cypriniformes
- Family: Danionidae
- Subfamily: Chedrinae
- Genus: Raiamas
- Species: R. ansorgii

Binomial name
- Raiamas ansorgii (Boulenger, 1910)

Synonyms
- Barilius ansorgii Boulenger, 1910

= Raiamas ansorgii =

Species of fish

Raiamas ansorgii is a species of ray-finned fish in the genus Raiamas. It is endemic to the Cuanza River in Angola.

== Etymology ==
The fish is named in honor of English explorer and collector William John Ansorge (1850–1913), who collected the holotype specimen.
