= Luciosoma pellegrinii =

Conservation status
- Least Concern (IUCN 3.1)

Scientific classification
- Kingdom: Animalia
- Phylum: Chordata
- Class: Actinopterygii
- Order: Cypriniformes
- Family: Danionidae
- Subfamily: Chedrinae
- Genus: Luciosoma
- Species: L. pellegrini

Binomial name
- Luciosoma pellegrini Popta, 1905

Species of fish

Luciosoma pellegrinii is a species of freshwater ray-finned fish belonging to the family Danionidae, the danios or danionins. This fish is endemic to northeastern and eastern Borneo.

== Etymology ==
The fish is named in honor of French zoologist Jacques Pellegrin (1873–1944).
