= Leptocypris crossensis =

Conservation status
- Least Concern (IUCN 3.1)

Scientific classification
- Kingdom: Animalia
- Phylum: Chordata
- Class: Actinopterygii
- Order: Cypriniformes
- Family: Danionidae
- Subfamily: Chedrinae
- Genus: Leptocypris
- Species: L. crossensis

Binomial name
- Leptocypris crossensis Howes & Teugels, 1989

Species of fish

Leptocypris crossensis is a species of freshwater ray-finned fish belonging to the family Danionidae. This fish is found in the Cross, Wouri and Sanaga River basins in Cameroon and Nigeria.
