= Leptocypris modestus =

Conservation status
- Least Concern (IUCN 3.1)

Scientific classification
- Kingdom: Animalia
- Phylum: Chordata
- Class: Actinopterygii
- Order: Cypriniformes
- Family: Danionidae
- Subfamily: Chedrinae
- Genus: Leptocypris
- Species: L. modestus

Binomial name
- Leptocypris modestus Boulenger, 1900

Synonyms
- Leptocypris brevirostris Boulenger, 1920; Leptocypris clupeoides Pellegrin, 1922

Species of fish

Leptocypris modestus is a species of freshwater ray-finned fish belonging to the family Danionidae. This fish is found in Congo River in the Democratic Republic of Congo and the Central African Republic. It is the type species of the genus Leptocypris.
