= Opsaridium engrauloides =

Conservation status
- Data Deficient (IUCN 3.1)

Scientific classification
- Kingdom: Animalia
- Phylum: Chordata
- Class: Actinopterygii
- Order: Cypriniformes
- Family: Danionidae
- Subfamily: Chedrinae
- Genus: Opsaridium
- Species: O. engrauloides

Binomial name
- Opsaridium engrauloides (Nichols, 1923)

Synonyms
- Barilius engrauloides Nichols, 1923

Species of fish

Opsaridium engrauloides is a species of ray-finned fish in the family Danionidae. It is found the Ubangi in the Central African Republic.
