= Coppernose barb =

Conservation status
- Least Concern (IUCN 3.1)

Scientific classification
- Kingdom: Animalia
- Phylum: Chordata
- Class: Actinopterygii
- Order: Cypriniformes
- Family: Danionidae
- Subfamily: Chedrinae
- Genus: Raiamas
- Species: R. christyi

Binomial name
- Raiamas christyi (Boulenger, 1920)

Synonyms
- Barilius christyi Boulenger, 1920; Opsaridium christyi (Boulenger, 1920)

Species of fish

The coppernose barb (Raiamas christyi) is a species of freshwater ray-finned fish belonging to the family Danionidae. This fish is found in the Congo River system in Africa.

== Etymology ==
The fish is named in honor of Cuthbert Christy (1863– 1932), an English physician who specialized in learning about sleeping sickness, he was also a zoologist, an explorer, and the Director of the Congo Museum (Tervuren, Belgium), who was the one who collected the holotype specimen.
