= Opsaridium maculicauda =

Conservation status
- Data Deficient (IUCN 3.1)

Scientific classification
- Kingdom: Animalia
- Phylum: Chordata
- Class: Actinopterygii
- Order: Cypriniformes
- Family: Danionidae
- Subfamily: Chedrinae
- Genus: Opsaridium
- Species: O. maculicauda

Binomial name
- Opsaridium maculicauda (Pellegrin, 1926)

Synonyms
- Barilius maculicauda Pellegrin, 1926

Species of fish

Opsaridium maculicauda is a species of ray-finned fish in the family Danionidae. It is found in the Kasai River in Democratic Republic of the Congo.
