= Theodore W. Kheel =

American lawyer

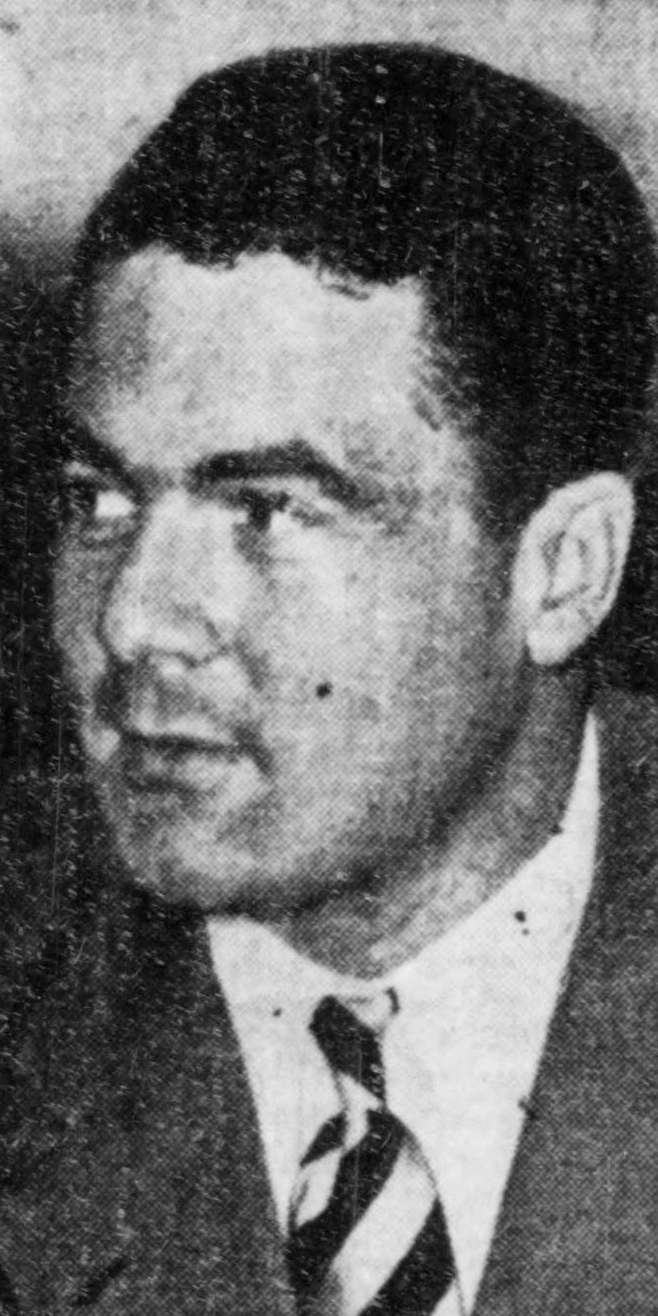
- Kheel c. 1949
- Born: May 9, 1914; Brooklyn, New York, U.S.
- Died: November 12, 2010 (aged 96); Manhattan, New York, U.S.
- Education: Cornell University (B.A., 1935); Cornell University (LL.B., 1937)
- Occupations: Attorney, labor mediator
- Known for: Key role in resolving the 1962–63 New York City newspaper strike
- Notable work: The Keys to Conflict Resolution: Proven Methods of Resolving Disputes Voluntarily
- Spouse: Ann Sunstein (m. 1937; died 2003)
- Children: 6

Theodore Woodrow Kheel (May 9, 1914 – November 12, 2010) was an American attorney and labor mediator who played a key role in reaching resolutions of long-simmering labor disputes between managements and unions and resulting strikes in New York City and elsewhere in the United States, including the 114-day-long 1962–63 New York City newspaper strike that crippled the city's traditional media.

== Early life and career ==
Kheel was born on May 9, 1914, in Brooklyn and was named for U.S. Presidents Roosevelt and Wilson. He attended DeWitt Clinton High School. Kheel received a B.A. degree from Cornell University in 1935 and was awarded his law degree from Cornell Law School in 1937. At Cornell, Kheel was elected to the Sphinx Head Society. He took a position with the National Labor Relations Board in 1938 and worked for the National War Labor Board during World War II, mediating labor disputes as part of an effort to maintain productivity of material needed for the ongoing war. Kheel was hired by New York City after the war and became the director of the city's department of labor relations in 1947.

== Labor mediation ==
Leaving public service in 1948, Kheel went into private practice, but remained involved in the public sphere as a labor negotiator, including being named as independent arbitrator for New York City's independent transit companies. Mayor of New York City Robert F. Wagner, Jr. named Kheel as the city's transit arbitrator in 1956, a position he held for almost thirty years while resolving tens of thousands of labor issues.

Mayor Wagner called on Kheel in 1963 to help mediate the ongoing New York City newspaper strike, in which ten different unions and the publishers of the city's various newspapers had already been deadlocked for nearly three months. Kheel was asked to step in and was so confident of a quick resolution of the dispute that he brought a pair of champagne bottles with him to the negotiations planning to celebrate. However, he ended up spending several hundred hours engaging in "shuttle negotiations", eventually reaching a pact in which the typographer's union received a larger increase then other union workers. An analysis performed by The New York Times showed that the newspapers involved in the strike had lost a total of more than $100 million in advertising and circulation revenues and that the industry's more than 19 thousand employees lost $50 million in wages and benefits. Kheel would later play a role in coordinating negotiations that led to a resolution of the New York City teachers' strike of 1968, in which the New York City Public Schools were closed for 36 days over a period of months after actions started by the United Federation of Teachers.

New York City Mayor Ed Koch was among those who said that contracts that Kheel negotiated between the city and its employees were overly generous and helped cause the fiscal crisis that the city faced in the 1970s. Koch replaced Kheel in 1982 as the City's chief labor negotiator.

In explaining his approach on reaching a settlement, Kheel said that "It is like sculpting an elephant: you chip away everything that doesn't look like an elephant and what's left is an elephant. When you are trying to get a labor contract, you do the same thing. You chip away everything that doesn't belong in the agreement, and what's left is the agreement".

== Personal ==
In addition to his mediation roles, Kheel wrote a multi-volume text on labor law and the popular book The Keys to Conflict Resolution: Proven Methods of Resolving Disputes Voluntarily. He was also widely involved with such philanthropic organizations as the Gandhi Society for Human Rights, and in the civil rights movement in the 50s and 60s where he served as Executive Director of the National Urban League during the term of NUL President Lester Granger. Kheel was one of the principals in Tom Mboya's efforts of the late 50s and early 60s to organize the "Airlift Africa" project that ultimately brought some 230 African students to the U.S. over the period 1960–63 to study on scholarship at Class I accredited colleges. Among these students was President Barack Obama's father, Barack Obama, Sr. who later settled in Hawaii where President Obama was born.

Kheel was one of the lead developers of the Puntacana Resort and Club in the Dominican Republic. Kheel founded the Nurture Nature Foundation, parent organization of the Nurture Nature Center, to help resolve the continuing conflict between environmental protection and economic development.

Kheel's commitment to sustainable development was wide and consistent. He created the Earth Times during the process leading to the 1992 Earth Summit in Rio de Janeiro, which preceded the 1997 Kyoto summit whereby more than 100 countries signed the Kyoto protocol and committed to reduce the emissions of carbon dioxide. To promote the Rio summit Kheel enrolled the help of his friends and client artist Robert Rauschenberg to create a poster named the Earth Pledge, which was signed by hundreds of Heads of state, ambassadors, delegates, and prominent dignitaries. The Earth Pledge was widely promoted during the summit, and applauded by Secretary General Maurice Strong. The proceeds of the sale of Rauchenberg's artwork were used to start the Earth Pledge Foundation, which went on to become an incubator of early stage sustainability solutions in the waste, architecture, fashion, and food systems, with projects that significantly accelerated the adoption of sustainability solutions in New York city. The Earth Pledge Foundation was managed by Kheel's protégée and environmental activist Leslie Hoffman from 1994 until 2011.

There are two centers endowed and named after Kheel: The Kheel Center for Labor-Management Documentation and Archives is the archival arm of Cornell's Martin P. Catherwood Library serving the New York State School of Industrial and Labor Relations and the Theodore W. Kheel Center on the Resolution of Environmental Interest Disputes at the Pace University School of Law.

A resident of Manhattan, Kheel died of natural causes at the age of 96 on November 12, 2010. He was survived by five daughters and one son, 11 grandchildren; and six great-grandchildren. His wife, Ann Sunstein, died in 2003 and had been an active member of the New York chapter of the National Urban League. Kheel had met Sunstein at Cornell while the two were studying there. A. J. Jacobs, author of The Year of Living Biblically is Kheel's grandson.

== Taxon named in his honor ==
Raiamas kheeli Stiassny, Schelly & Schliewen, 2006 is a species of cyprinid fish in the genus Raiamas from the Democratic Republic of the Congo.
