= Opsaridium loveridgii =

Conservation status
- Least Concern (IUCN 3.1)

Scientific classification
- Kingdom: Animalia
- Phylum: Chordata
- Class: Actinopterygii
- Order: Cypriniformes
- Family: Danionidae
- Subfamily: Chedrinae
- Genus: Opsaridium
- Species: O. loveridgii

Binomial name
- Opsaridium loveridgii (Norman, 1922)

Synonyms
- Barilius loveridgii Norman, 1922

Species of fish

Opsaridium loveridgii is a species of ray-finned fish in the family Danionidae. It is found only in Tanzania. Its natural habitats are rivers and freshwater lakes.

== Etymology ==
The fish is named in honor of British herpetologist-ornithologist Arthur Loveridge (1891–1980), who presented the holotype specimen to the British Museum of Natural History.
