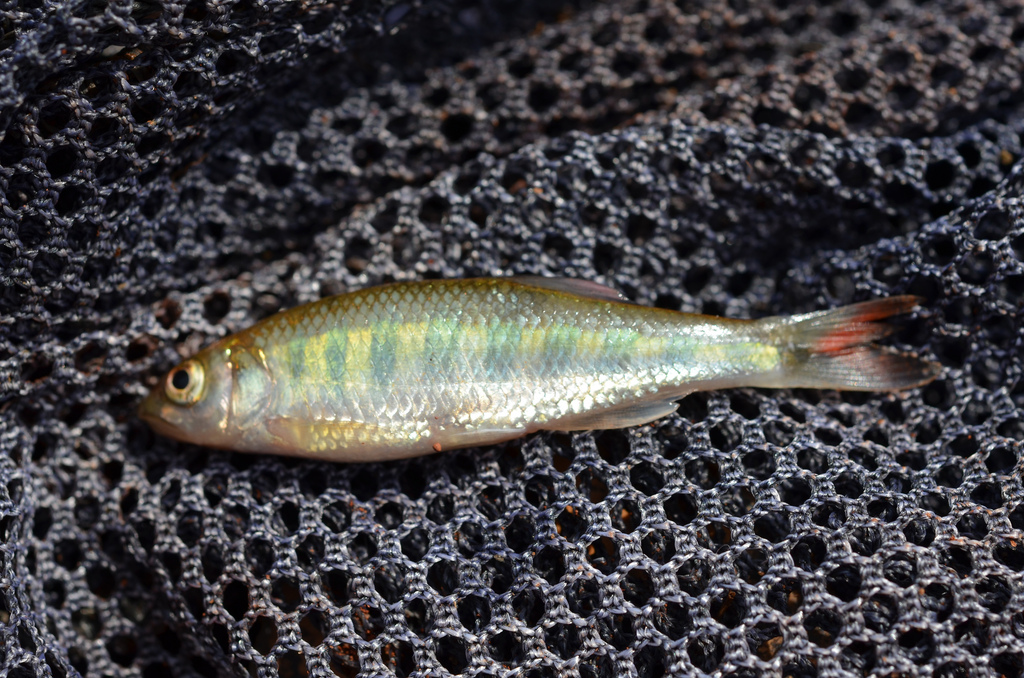

Conservation status
- Least Concern (IUCN 3.1)

Scientific classification
- Kingdom: Animalia
- Phylum: Chordata
- Class: Actinopterygii
- Order: Cypriniformes
- Family: Danionidae
- Subfamily: Chedrinae
- Genus: Raiamas
- Species: R. senegalensis

Binomial name
- Raiamas senegalensis (Steindachner, 1870)

Synonyms
- Barilius senegalensis Steindachner, 1870; Barilius loati Boulenger, 1901; Raiamas loati (Boulenger, 1901); Barilius macrostoma Boulenger, 1913; Raiamas macrostoma (Boulenger, 1913)

= Raiamas senegalensis =

Species of fish

Raiamas senegalensis (silver fish, Senegal trout barb or Senegal minnow) is a species of freshwater ray-finned fish belonging to the family Danionidae, the danios or danionins. This species is from western Africa east to the River Nile. It sometimes is found in the aquarium trade.

== Description ==
Raiamas senegalensis has eleven dorsal soft rays and 16 anal soft rays. It is usually marked with less than 15 vertical bars on its sides and a round spot on caudal peduncle. The background colour is silvery with a greyish green dorsum, the vertical bars decrease in size towards the head. The maximum total length is 245 mm (9.6 in). It is not sexually dimorphic.

== Distribution ==
Raiamas senegalensis is found in western Africa as far east at the Nile basin. It is found in the basins of the Nile, Lake Chad, Niger, Gambia, Senegal, Volta and the coastal basins of Sassandra, Bandama, Comoé, Tano, Pra, Ouémé, Ogun and Sanaga, which seems to represent its southern distributional limit; it is also known from the Cross River in Cameroon. This means that the countries this species has been recorded in are Benin, Burkina Faso, Cameroon, Central African Republic, Chad, Egypt, Ethiopia, Gambia, Ghana, Guinea, Ivory Coast Mali, Niger, Nigeria, Senegal, Sudan and Togo.

== Habitat and ecology ==
Raiamas senegalensis is a freshwater demersal fish. It is predatory planktophage of non insect plankton during the day but switches to insect plankton at night

== Human use ==
Raiamas senegalensis is traded within the aquarium trade.

== Conservation status ==
Raiamas senegalensis has a wide distribution, there are no known major widespread threats so it is therefore listed as Least Concern.
