= Raiamas marqueti =

Scientific classification
- Kingdom: Animalia
- Phylum: Chordata
- Class: Actinopterygii
- Order: Cypriniformes
- Family: Danionidae
- Subfamily: Chedrinae
- Genus: Raiamas
- Species: R. marqueti

Binomial name
- Raiamas marqueti Manda, Snoeks, Manda & Vreven, 2018

Species of fish

Raiamas marqueti i is a species of freshwater ray-finned fish belonging to the family Danionidae, the danios or danionins. It is found on the right bank tributaries of Upper Congo River and the affluents of Lake Tanganyika in the Democratic Republic of the Congo, Burundi and Tanzania.

== Size ==
This species reaches a length of 19.7 cm (7.8 in).

== Etymology ==
The fish is named in honor of Jean-Pierre Marquet, a technical assistant of the BTC (Belgian Technical Cooperation) project PRODEPAAK (Projet de Développement de la Pêche Artisanale et de l’Aquaculture au Katanga, 2008–2013), for his efforts in fish collecting, and who provided logistical support for the Katanga Expedition 2012, during which the holotype specimen was collected.
