= Leptocypris taiaensis =

Conservation status
- Endangered (IUCN 3.1)

Scientific classification
- Kingdom: Animalia
- Phylum: Chordata
- Class: Actinopterygii
- Order: Cypriniformes
- Family: Danionidae
- Subfamily: Chedrinae
- Genus: Leptocypris
- Species: L. taiaensis

Binomial name
- Leptocypris taiaensis Howes & Teugels, 1989

Species of fish

Leptocypris taiaensis is a species of freshwater ray-finned fish belonging to the family Danionidae. This fish is endemic to Taia River, Little Scarcies River and Waanje River in Sierre Leone.
