= Leptocypris lujae =

Conservation status
- Least Concern (IUCN 3.1)

Scientific classification
- Kingdom: Animalia
- Phylum: Chordata
- Class: Actinopterygii
- Order: Cypriniformes
- Family: Danionidae
- Subfamily: Chedrinae
- Genus: Leptocypris
- Species: L. lujae

Binomial name
- Leptocypris lujae Boulenger, 1909

Synonyms
- Barilius lujae Boulenger, 1909; Raiamas lujae (Boulenger, 1909)

Species of fish

Leptocypris lujae is a species of freshwater ray-finned fish belonging to the family Danionidae. This fish is found in the Congo River up to the Lualaba River in the Democratic Republic of Congo and the Central African Republic.

== Etymology ==
The fish is named in honor of Luxembourgian botanist-entomologist Édouard-Pierre Luja (1875–1953), who as a resident of Kasai, Zaire collected the holotype specimen.
