= Bathanalia howesi =

Conservation status
- Endangered (IUCN 3.1)

Scientific classification
- Kingdom: Animalia
- Phylum: Mollusca
- Class: Gastropoda
- Subclass: Caenogastropoda
- Family: Paludomidae
- Genus: Bathanalia
- Species: B. howesi

Binomial name
- Bathanalia howesi (Moore, 1898)

Species of gastropod

Bathanalia howesi is a species of tropical freshwater snail with an operculum, aquatic gastropod mollusk in the family Paludomidae.

Bathanalia howesi is the type species of the genus Bathanalia.

== Distribution ==
This species is found in Lake Tanganyika in the Democratic Republic of the Congo, Tanzania and Zambia.

Type locality is southern shore near Mleroes, Lake Tanganyika in depth of 243 m (800 feet).

== Description ==
The shell of Bathanalia howesi is recognizable with spines.

The width of the shell is 17 mm. The height of the shell is 25 mm.

== Ecology ==
It was found in depths from 45 m. John Edmund Sharrock Moore have thought that this species can live up to depth 300 m, but Leloup (1953) mentioned maximum depth of 150–200 m.
