= Leptocypris weeksii =

Conservation status
- Least Concern (IUCN 3.1)

Scientific classification
- Kingdom: Animalia
- Phylum: Chordata
- Class: Actinopterygii
- Order: Cypriniformes
- Family: Danionidae
- Subfamily: Chedrinae
- Genus: Leptocypris
- Species: L. weeksii

Binomial name
- Leptocypris weeksii (Boulenger, 1899)

Synonyms
- Barilius weeksii Boulenger, 1899; Raiamas weeksii (Boulenger, 1899)

Species of fish

Leptocypris weeksii is a species of freshwater ray-finned fish belonging to the family Danionidae. This fish is found in the lower Congo River, the central and upper Congo River basin, and Pool Malebo in the Democratic Republic of Congo.

== Etymology ==
The fish is named in honor of John Henry Weeks (1861–1924), a Baptist missionary, an ethnographer, an explorer and diarist, who collected the holotype specimen at his mission station in Monsembe, upper Congo River, Zaire.
