= Raiamas steindachneri =

Conservation status
- Least Concern (IUCN 3.1)

Scientific classification
- Kingdom: Animalia
- Phylum: Chordata
- Class: Actinopterygii
- Order: Cypriniformes
- Family: Danionidae
- Subfamily: Chedrinae
- Genus: Raiamas
- Species: R. steindachneri

Binomial name
- Raiamas steindachneri (Pellegrin, 1908)

Synonyms
- Barilius steindachneri Pellegrin, 1908; Barilius silex Schultz, 1942

Species of fish

Raiamas steindachneri is a species of ray-finned fish in the genus Raiamas.

== Etymology ==
The fish is named in honor of Austrian ichthyologist-herpetologist Franz Steindachner (1834–1919), the director of the Imperial Natural History Museum of Vienna.
