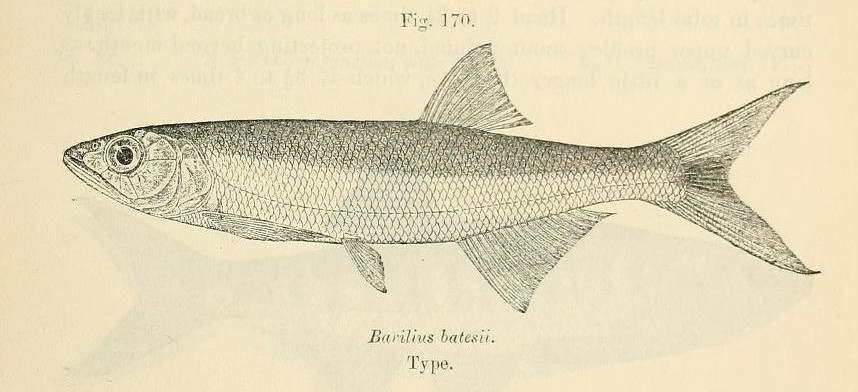
- Barilius batesii

Conservation status
- Least Concern (IUCN 3.1)

Scientific classification
- Kingdom: Animalia
- Phylum: Chordata
- Class: Actinopterygii
- Order: Cypriniformes
- Family: Danionidae
- Subfamily: Chedrinae
- Genus: Raiamas
- Species: R. batesii

Binomial name
- Raiamas batesii (Boulenger, 1914)

Synonyms
- Barilius batesii Boulenger, 1914

= Raiamas batesii =

Species of fish

Raiamas batesii is a species of cyprinid fish in the genus Raiamas. It occurs in the Dja River, Sanaga River and Nyong River in Cameroon where it forms part of a fishery.

== Etymology ==
The fish is named in honor of an American farmer and amateur ornithologist, George Latimer Bates (1863–1940), who collected specimens for the Natural History Museum in the Cameroons, including the holotype specimen of this species.
