= Luciosoma trinema =

Conservation status
- Least Concern (IUCN 3.1)

Scientific classification
- Kingdom: Animalia
- Phylum: Chordata
- Class: Actinopterygii
- Order: Cypriniformes
- Family: Danionidae
- Subfamily: Chedrinae
- Genus: Luciosoma
- Species: L. trinema

Binomial name
- Luciosoma trinema (Bleeker, 1852)

Synonyms
- Leuciscus trinema Bleeker, 1852

Species of fish

Luciosoma trinema is a species of freshwater ray-finned fish belonging to the family Danionidae, the danios or danionins. This fish is found on the Malay Peninsula, Sumatra and Borneo.
