= George Bond Howes =

English zoologist (1853–1905)

Thomas George Bond Howes FRS
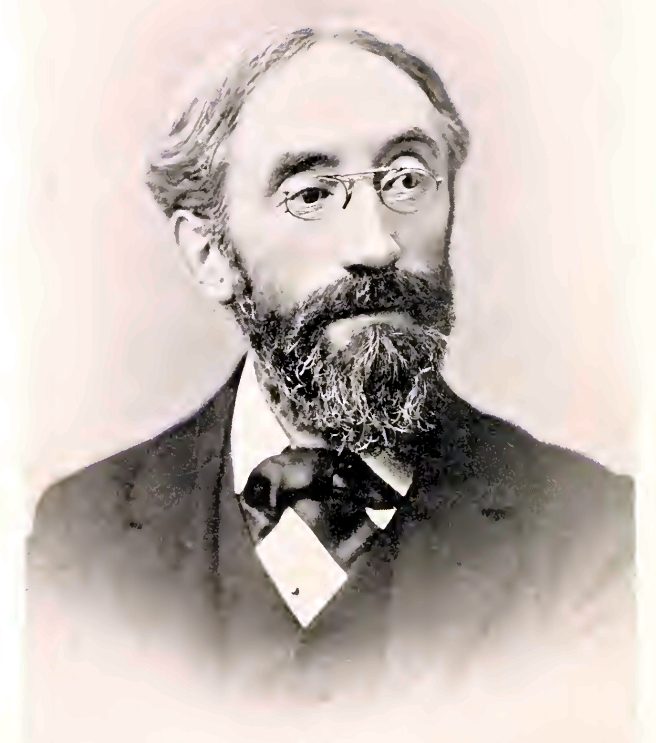
- George Bond Howes
- Born: 7 September 1853; Newington, London
- Died: 4 February 1905 (aged 51); Chiswick, London
- Spouse: Annie Watkins
- Children: 1
- Scientific career
- Fields: Zoology
- Institutions: Royal College of Science

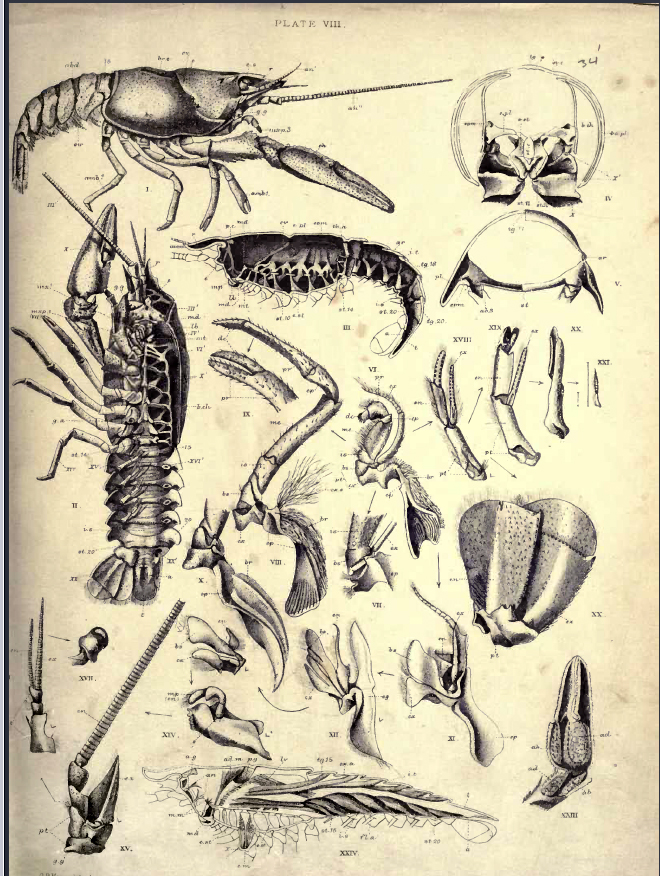
Plate from "Atlas of Practical Elementary Biology" (1885)

Thomas George Bond Howes, FRS (7 September 1853 Newington, London - 4 February 1905 Chiswick) was an English zoologist.

== Life ==
He was born, probably in Kennington, London, the eldest son of hosier Thomas Johnson Howes and Augusta Mary Bond, daughter of George Augustus Bond, a captain in the East India Company's service.

Howes was assistant professor of zoology at the Normal School of Science from 1885. From 1895, Howes was first professor of zoology at the Royal College of Science in South Kensington.

After being introduced to Thomas Huxley in 1874, his skill as a draughtsman and enthusiasm as a naturalist led to his being employed as assistant to Huxley. He was tasked with developing a system of practical instruction in biology at the Normal School of Science and the Royal School of Mines at Kensington, where he was appointed demonstrator of biology in 1880.

Howes was an eminently gifted teacher. The comprehensiveness of the biology courses at the Royal College of Science attested to his knowledge and thoroughness. He invested much of his energy in founding and supporting societies concerned with the natural sciences, serving as office bearer in many of these. His drawing skills were well above average: the Atlas of Elementary Biology (1885) was illustrated entirely with his drawings.

Howes's main interest lay with the comparative anatomy of the Vertebrata, a field to which he made significant contributions. An important account, which Howes co-authored with H. H. Swinnerton, dealt with the development of the skeleton of the Norfolk Island reptile, the Tuatara or Sphenodon and appeared in Transactions of the Zoological Society, 1901. John Edmund Sharrock Moore worked within Howes's laboratory from 1892 - 1905.

He was elected Fellow of the Royal Society in 1897, Legum Doctor at St Andrews in 1898, and Doctor of Science at Manchester in 1899.

He was President of the Malacological Society of London (1895-1896), Treasurer of the Anatomical Society, Zoological Secretary of the Linnean Society and a Member of the Council of the Zoological Society of London.

Bathanalia howsei, the type species of the genus Bathanalia, is named after him.

== Personal life ==
In 1881 Howes married Annie, daughter of James Watkins. They had one daughter.

== Publications ==
- Zoology and Food Fishes (1883)
- Atlas of practical elementary biology (1885)
- Atlas of practical elementary zootomy (1902)
