= Lake Rukwa minnow =

Conservation status
- Least Concern (IUCN 3.1)

Scientific classification
- Kingdom: Animalia
- Phylum: Chordata
- Class: Actinopterygii
- Order: Cypriniformes
- Family: Danionidae
- Subfamily: Chedrinae
- Genus: Raiamas
- Species: R. moorii

Binomial name
- Raiamas moorii (Boulenger, 1900)

Synonyms
- Barilius moorii Boulenger, 1900

Species of fish

The Lake Rukwa minnow (Raiamas moorii) is a species of ray-finned fish in the family Cyprinidae. It is found in Lake Tanganyika, Lake Kivu and Lake Rukwa in Tanzania, the Democratic Republic of the Congo, Rwanda, Tanzania and Zambia. Its natural habitats are rivers, freshwater lakes, freshwater marshes, and inland deltas.

== Etymology ==
The fish is named in honor of John Edmund Sharrock Moore (1870–1947), a British biologist and a Tanganyika expedition leader, who discovered this species.
