= Leptocypris konkoureensis =

Conservation status
- Vulnerable (IUCN 3.1)

Scientific classification
- Kingdom: Animalia
- Phylum: Chordata
- Class: Actinopterygii
- Order: Cypriniformes
- Family: Danionidae
- Subfamily: Chedrinae
- Genus: Leptocypris
- Species: L. konkoureensis

Binomial name
- Leptocypris konkoureensis Howes & Teugels, 1989

Species of fish

Leptocypris konkoureensis is a species of freshwater ray-finned fish belonging to the family Danionidae. This fish is endemic to the Kakrima River in Guinea.
