= Raiamas kheeli =

Conservation status
- Data Deficient (IUCN 3.1)

Scientific classification
- Kingdom: Animalia
- Phylum: Chordata
- Class: Actinopterygii
- Order: Cypriniformes
- Family: Danionidae
- Subfamily: Chedrinae
- Genus: Raiamas
- Species: R. kheeli

Binomial name
- Raiamas kheeli Stiassny, Schelly & Schliewen, 2006

Species of fish

Raiamas kheeli is a species of cyprinid fish in the genus Raiamas from the Democratic Republic of the Congo.

== Etymology ==
The fish is named in honor of American attorney and labor mediator Theodore W. Kheel (1914–2010), because of his "enduring support for nature conservation and sustainable development around the globe". In 1991, Kheel founded the Nurture Nature Foundation to help resolve the conflict between environmental protection groups and economic development.
