= Lake Rukwa sardine =

Conservation status
- Vulnerable (IUCN 3.1)

Scientific classification
- Kingdom: Animalia
- Phylum: Chordata
- Class: Actinopterygii
- Order: Cypriniformes
- Family: Danionidae
- Subfamily: Chedrinae
- Genus: Chelaethiops
- Species: C. rukwaensis

Binomial name
- Chelaethiops rukwaensis (Ricardo, 1939)

Synonyms
- Engraulicypris congicus rukwaensis Ricardo, 1939

Species of fish

The Lake Rukwa sardine (Chelaethiops rukwaensis) is an African species of freshwater fish in the family Danionidae. It is found only in Tanzania. Its natural habitat is freshwater lakes. It is threatened by habitat loss.
