= Lettice Digby (scientist) =

British cytologist, botanist

- Born: 31 July 1877; London
- Died: 27 November 1972 (aged 95); Colchester
- Scientific career
- Fields: Cytology; Botany; Malacology

Lettice Digby (31 July 1877 – 27 November 1972) was a British cytologist, botanist and malacologist. Her work provided the first demonstration that a fertile polyploid hybrid had formed between two cultivated plant species.

== Education and personal life ==
Digby was born on 31 July 1877 in Chelsea, London, UK. She was the second of the four children of Sir Kenelm Edward Digby and Hon. Caroline Strutt who had married on 30 August 1870. She studied at the Royal College of Science. By 1907 she was living in Kingsford, Colchester, and she died in Colchester, Essex, UK on 27 November 1972.

== Scientific career ==
Digby was active in research within both botany and malacology, where she applied the technologies of cytology.

Her application of cytology to the Kew primrose (Primula kewensis) provided the first example of a polyploid hybrid to be recorded. This fertile polyploid species arose through chromosome doubling in an otherwise infertile hybrid. The fertile polyploid with 36 chromosomes was formed at Royal Botanic Gardens, Kew among infertile hybrids between P. verticillata, originating from Africa and Asia, and P. floribunda, from the Himalayas. The hybrids had been noticed in 1899 by staff at Kew, particularly Frank Garett, and were awarded a First Class certificate at a Royal Horticultural Society meeting in 1900. They were large plants with attractive flowers. The lack of fertile seeds despite repeated efforts at crossing the parents was a problem until some were obtained in 1905. Digby was thus able to compare both fertile and infertile hybrids. P. kewensis continued to be cited into the 21st century as an example of a new species originating from human activities.

Digby made measurements of chromosome length, width and number during meiosis in both plants (such as smooth hawk's-beard (Crepis virens) and Primula) and animals such as Helix pomatia and Homarus gammarus.

She collaborated with John B Farmer and John E S Moore, early investigators of the units of heredity. She worked with Farmer on chromosome counts of the intergeneric hybrid fern Schneider’s Polypody, Polypodium schneideri. This was not known to have parents from different genera at the time, and the technology of the time made precise chromosome visualisation in ferns difficult. She analysed the structure and taxonomy of some gastropods Moore had collected in Lake Tanganyika. This was at a time when the relationship of chromosome structures to inheritance was under active investigation. In addition, after the success of genetic studies in Drosophila, the selection of additional model organisms was needed to ascertain whether these findings could be generalised to all plants and animals. Smooth hawk's-beard was proposed as another model organism. Digby had studied its cytology, determining that it had 3 pairs of chromosomes. Her work on the structure of chromosomes, their changes during mitosis and meiosis and their relationship to the units of heredity was early support for the chromosome theory of inheritance.

Digby spent some of her career at the Biological Laboratory, Royal College of Science and at the Jodrell Laboratory, Royal Botanic Gardens, Kew. In 1903 she exhibited her work at the Royal Society's ladies' soireé.

During the First World War she spent time working as a laboratory assistant at the South African Military Hospital in Richmond Park, London. In 1919-1920 she was working with E.E. Glynn of University of Liverpool to study pneumococcal infections using serological and bacteriological methods, financed by the Medical Research Council.

== Awards ==
- She was elected a member of the Malacological Society of London in 1903.
- She was elected an ordinary fellow of the Royal Microscopical Society in 1918.

== Publications ==
Digby was author or co-author of at least 8 scientific papers:

- J. B. Farmer, J. E. S. Moore and Digby L. (1902) On the cytology of apogamy and apospory - 1 preliminary note on apogamy. Proceedings of the Royal Society of London 71 (475) 453-457
- Digby, L. (1902) On the structure and affinities of some gastropods from Lake Tanganyika belonging to the genera Chytra and Limnotrochus (communicated by Prof G. B. Howes, Sec L.S. and read on her behalf by Mr J. E. S. Moore). Linnean Journal of Zoology 28 434 - 442
- Digby, L. (1902) On the Nyassa vivipara and its relationship to Neothauma. Read at the Linnean Society 20 February 1902.
- Digby, L. (1903) Preliminary note on the anatomy of the genus Cataulus. Proceedings of the Malacological Society of London 5 261
- Digby, L. (1905) On the cytology of apogamy and apospory. II. Preliminary note on apospory. Proceedings of the Royal Society of London Series B 76 (512) 463-467
- J. Bretland Farmer and L Digby (1907) Studies in apospory and apogamy in Ferns. Annals of Botany 21 (81-84) 161-199
- Digby, L. (1909) Observations on 'chromatin bodies' and their relation to the nucleolus in Galtonia candicans, Decsne. Annals of Botany 23 (89-92) 491-499
- Digby, L. (1910) The somatic, premeiotic, and meiotic nuclear divisions of Galtonia candicans. Annals of Botany 24 (93 - 96) 727-757
- Digby, L. (1912) The cytology of Primula kewensis and of other related primula hybrids. Annals of Botany 26 (101-4) 357-U111
- Digby, L. (1914) A Critical Study of the Cytology of Crepis virens Arch. Zellf. 12 97-146
- J. B. Farmer and Digby L. (1914) On dimensions of chromosomes considered in relation to phylogeny Proceedings of the Royal Society of London Series B 205
- Digby, L. (1919) On the archesporial and meiotic mitoses of Osmunda Annals of Botany 33 (130) 135-172
