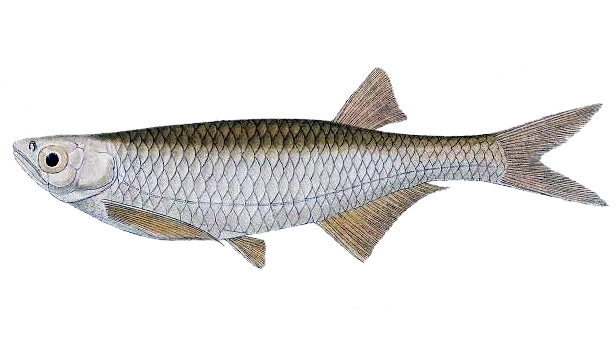
- Chelaethiops bibie

Scientific classification
- Kingdom: Animalia
- Phylum: Chordata
- Class: Actinopterygii
- Order: Cypriniformes
- Family: Danionidae
- Subfamily: Chedrinae
- Genus: Chelaethiops; Boulenger, 1899

Type species
- Chelaethiops elongatus Boulenger, 1899

Synonyms
- Anchovicypris Fowler, 1936

= Chelaethiops =

Genus of fishes

Chelaethiops is a genus of freshwater ray-finned fishes belonging to the family Danionidae, the danionins or danios. The fishes in this genus are found in lakes and rivers of Africa. While commonly called "sardines", they are not related to the true sardines of the family Clupeidae.

== Species ==
Chelaethiops contains the following species:

- Chelaethiops bibie (Joannis, 1835) (Lake Turkana sardine)
- Chelaethiops congicus (Nichols & Griscom, 1917)
- Chelaethiops elongatus Boulenger, 1899
- Chelaethiops minutus (Boulenger, 1906)
- Chelaethiops rukwaensis (Ricardo, 1939) (Lake Rukwa Sardine)
