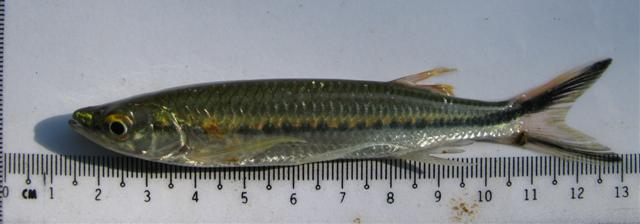
- Luciosoma setigerum

Scientific classification
- Kingdom: Animalia
- Phylum: Chordata
- Class: Actinopterygii
- Order: Cypriniformes
- Family: Danionidae
- Subfamily: Chedrinae
- Genus: Luciosoma; Bleeker, 1855

Type species
- Barbus setigerus Valenciennes, 1842

Synonyms
- Trinematichthys Bleeker, 1860

= Luciosoma =

Genus of fishes

Luciosoma is a genus of freshwater ray-finned fish belonging to the family Danionidae, the danionins or danios. The fishes in this genus are found in Southeast Asia

== Species ==
Luciosoma contains the following species:

- Luciosoma bleekeri Steindachner, 1878 (Shark minnow)
- Luciosoma pellegrinii Popta, 1905
- Luciosoma setigerum (Valenciennes, 1842)
- Luciosoma spilopleura Bleeker, 1855 (Apollo sharkminnow)
- Luciosoma trinema (Bleeker, 1852)

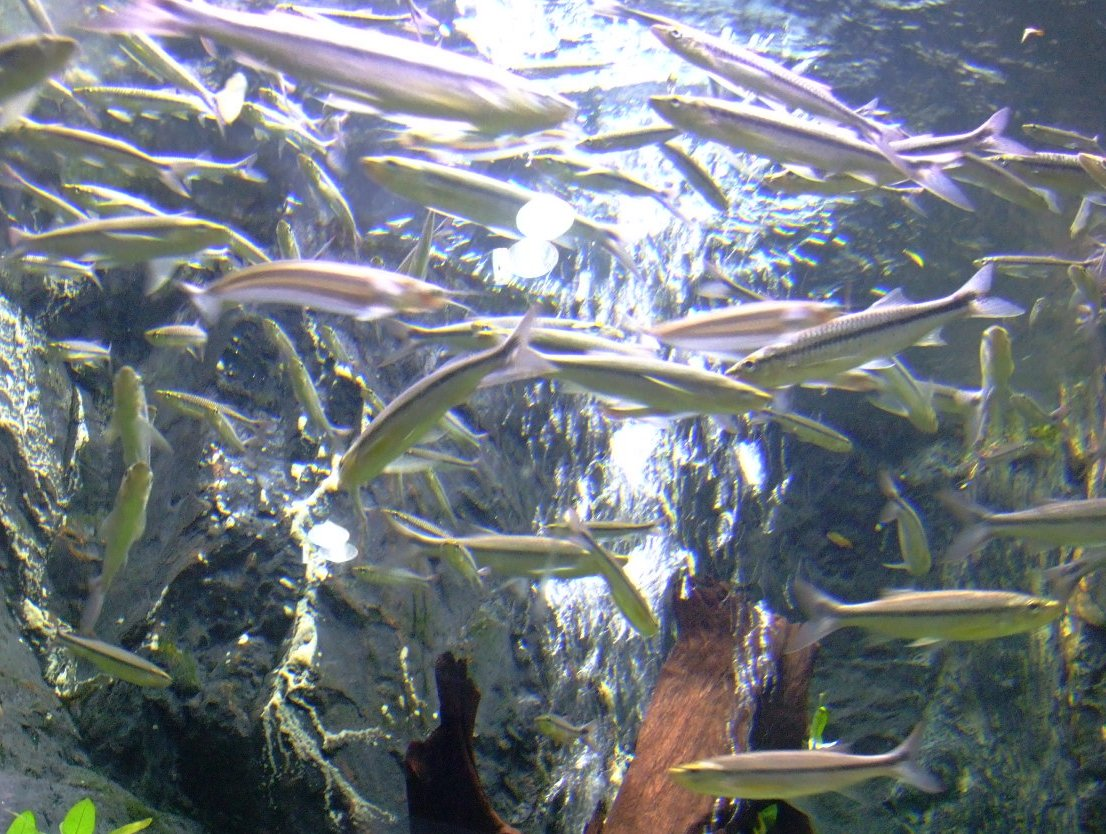
School of Luciosoma bleekeri at Bueng Chawak Aquarium in Suphanburi, Thailand
