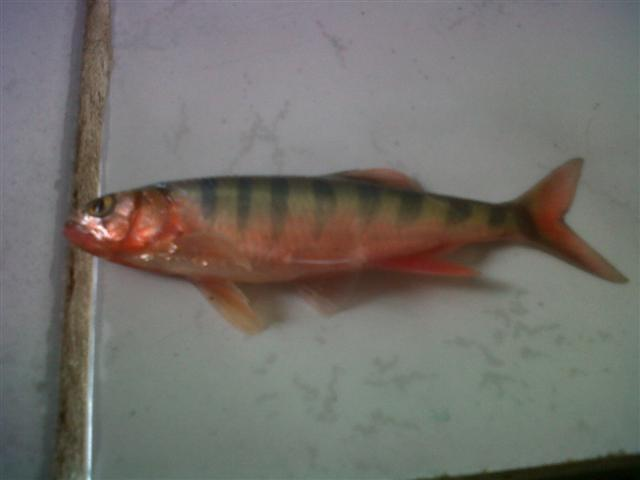
- Opsaridium peringueyi

Scientific classification
- Kingdom: Animalia
- Phylum: Chordata
- Class: Actinopterygii
- Order: Cypriniformes
- Family: Danionidae
- Subfamily: Chedrinae
- Genus: Opsaridium; W. K. H. Peters, 1854

Type species
- Leuciscus zambezensis Peters, 1852

Synonyms
- Pelotrophus Günther, 1864; Sagittabarilius Fowler, 1936

= Opsaridium =

Genus of fishes

Opsaridium is a genus of freshwater ray-finned fishes belonging to the family Danionidae, the danios or danionins. The fishes in this genus are found in Africa.

== Species ==
Opsaridium contains the following species:

- Opsaridium boweni (Fowler, 1930)
- Opsaridium engrauloides (Nichols, 1923)
- Opsaridium leleupi (Matthes, 1965)
- Opsaridium loveridgii (Norman, 1922)
- Opsaridium maculicauda (Pellegrin, 1926)
- Opsaridium microcephalum (Günther, 1864)
- Opsaridium microlepis (Günther, 1864) (lake salmon)
- Opsaridium peringueyi (Gilchrist & W. W. Thompson, 1913) (southern barred minnow)
- Opsaridium splendens Taverne & De Vos, 1997
- Opsaridium tweddleorum P. H. Skelton, 1996 (dwarf sanjika)
- Opsaridium ubangiense (Pellegrin, 1901)
- Opsaridium zambezense (W. K. H. Peters, 1852) (barred minnow)

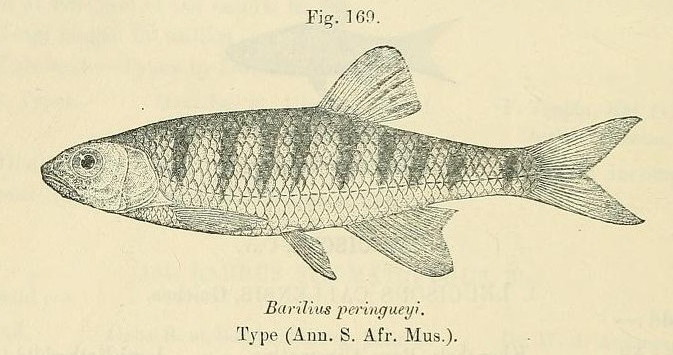
Opsaridium peringueyi
