= Gamia =

Scientific classification
- Kingdom: Animalia
- Phylum: Arthropoda
- Class: Insecta
- Order: Lepidoptera
- Family: Hesperiidae
- Tribe: Astictopterini
- Genus: Gamia; Holland, 1896

Genus of butterflies

Gamia is a genus of skippers in the family Hesperiidae.

== Species ==
- Gamia abri Miller & Collins, 1997
- Gamia buchholzi (Plötz, 1879)
- Gamia shelleyi (Sharpe, 1890)
