= Bathanalia straeleni =

Conservation status
- Least Concern (IUCN 3.1)

Scientific classification
- Kingdom: Animalia
- Phylum: Mollusca
- Class: Gastropoda
- Subclass: Caenogastropoda
- Family: Paludomidae
- Genus: Bathanalia
- Species: B. straeleni

Binomial name
- Bathanalia straeleni Leloup, 1953

Species of gastropod

Bathanalia straeleni is a species of tropical freshwater snail with operculum, aquatic gastropod mollusk in the family Paludomidae.

This species is found in Burundi, the Democratic Republic of the Congo, Tanzania, and Zambia. Its natural habitat is intermittent freshwater lakes.
