= Reinhold Wilhelm Buchholz =

German zoologist (1837–1876)

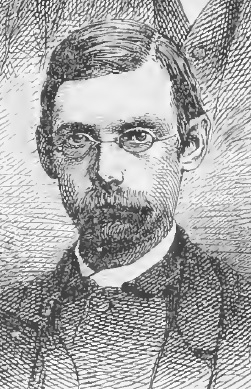
Reinhold Wilhelm Buchholz

Reinhold Wilhelm Buchholz (2 October 1837, Frankfurt an der Oder – 17 April 1876) was a German zoologist who made contributions in the fields of herpetology, carcinology and ichthyology.

He studied medicine at the University of Königsberg, and in 1872 became an associate professor of zoology at the University of Greifswald. In 1876 he was appointed a full professor and director of the zoological museum at Greifswald, but died soon afterwards.

In 1869–70 he participated as a scientist on the Second German North Polar Expedition, aboard the schooner Hansa. From 1872, with Anton Reichenow, he was stationed in western equatorial Africa, where he conducted zoological research in Kamerun, Gabon and Fernando Pó.

He was the taxonomic authority or co-authority of numerous zoological taxa. With naturalist Wilhelm Peters, he described the African toad genus Nectophryne as well as several other herpetological species. He also has a number of species named after him; two examples being Raiamas buchholzi and Pantodon buchholzi. While in West Africa, he also collected botanical specimens, and in 1886, Adolf Engler named the plant genus Buchholzia (family Capparaceae) after him.

== Taxon described by him ==
- See Category:Taxa named by Reinhold Wilhelm Buchholz

== Taxon named in his honor ==
- Raiamas buchholzi is a species of ray-finned fish.
- Gamia buchholzi, commonly known as the grand skipper, is a species of butterfly in the family Hesperiidae. It is found in Sierra Leone, Ivory Coast, Ghana, Nigeria, Cameroon, Gabon, the Republic of the Congo, the Central African Republic, the Democratic Republic of the Congo, Uganda, western Kenya and north-western Tanzania.
- The freshwater butterflyfish or African butterflyfish Pantodon buchholzi is a species of osteoglossiform fish native to freshwater habitats in the Niger and Congo basins of western and central Africa.
- Poliana buchholzi is a moth of the family Sphingidae. It is known from forests from western Africa to Uganda and western Kenya.
- Anthene buchholzi is a butterfly in the family Lycaenidae. It is found in Cameroon.
- Agrotis buchholzi, or Buchholz's dart moth, is a species of cutworm or dart moth in the family Noctuidae.
- Enchytraeus buchholzi, Grindal worms, are enchytraeid oligochaete worms.
- Zale buchholzi, or Buchholz's zale, is a moth of the family Erebidae.
- Danuria buchholzi is a species of praying mantis in the family Deroplatyidae.
- Clonaria buchholzi (Gerstaecker, 1883)
- Azuragrion buchholzi Dragonfly
- Chrysobasis buchholzi Dragonfly
- The insect Buchholz' cordulegaster (Cordulegaster helladica buchholzi)
- Buchholz's holomelina moth, Holomelina buchholzi
- Camponotus buchholzi Mayr, 1902
- Tipula buchholzi Mannheims & Theowald, 1959
- Strymon buchholzi
- The Damselfly Leptobasis buchholzi (Rácenis, 1959)
- Streptostele buchholzi E. von Martens, 1876
- Rhabdogulella buchholzi (E. von Martens, 1876)

== Honoria ==
Buchholzbukta, a bight on the eastern coast of Spitzbergen is named in his honor.

== Associated writings ==
- "Anatomische Untersuchungen über den Bau der Araneiden". In: Archiv für Anatomie, Physiologie und wissenschaftliche Medizin, Jg. 1868, S. 240–255; with Leonard Landois – Anatomical studies on the construction of orb-weaver spiders.
- Bemerkungen über die Arten der Gattung "Dermaleichus" Koch., 1869 – Remarks on species within the genus Dermaleichus (a genus of crustaceans).
- "Beiträge zur Kenntniss der innerhalb der Ascidien lebenden parasitischen Crustaceen des Mittelmeeres". In: Zeitschrift für wissenschaftliche Zoologie, Band. 19. W. Engelmann, Leipzig 1869.
- He was the author of the section on Crustacea in Die zweite deutsche Nordpolarfahrt in den Jahren 1869 und 1870; (1874).
- Land und Leute in Westafrika. Vortrag, 1876 – The land and people of West Africa.
- Über die von Professor Dr. Reinhold Buchholz in Westafrica gesammelten Fische, 1876 MB S. 244-252 mit 1 Tafel. 217. by Wilhelm Peters – On Buchholz' fish collection from West Africa.
- Reinhold Buchholz' Reisen in West-Afrika nach seinen hinterlassenen Tagebüchern und Briefen, 1880 (published by Karl Heinersdorff) – Reinhold Buchholz' journey in West Africa according to his posthumous diaries and letters.
