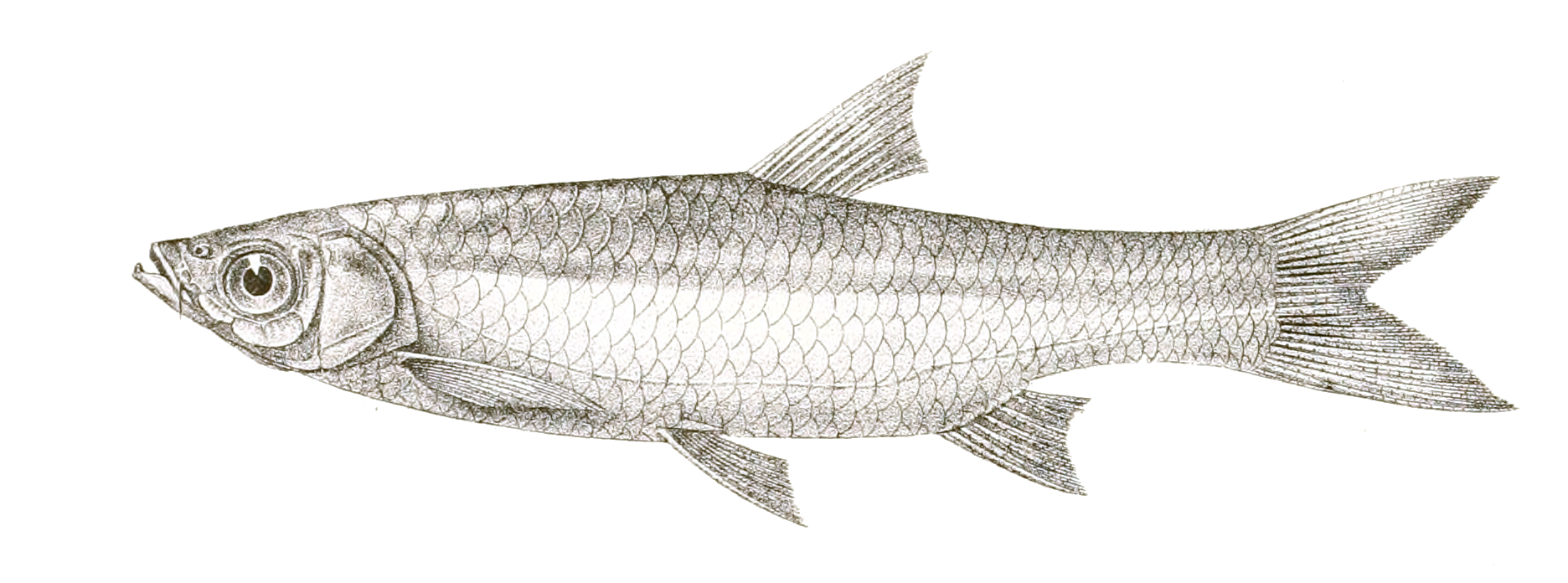

Conservation status
- Least Concern (IUCN 3.1)

Scientific classification
- Kingdom: Animalia
- Phylum: Chordata
- Class: Actinopterygii
- Order: Cypriniformes
- Family: Danionidae
- Subfamily: Chedrinae
- Genus: Bengala; Gray, 1868
- Species: B. elanga

Binomial name
- Bengala elanga (F. Hamilton, 1822)

Synonyms
- Genus: Megarasbora Günther, 1834; Species: Cyprinus elanga Hamilton, 1822; Megarasbora elanga (Hamilton, 1822); Leuciscus elanga (Hamilton, 1822); Rasbora elanga (Hamilton, 1822)

= Bengala barb =

Species of fish

The Bengala barb (Bengala elanga) is a freshwater ray-finned fish belonging to the family Danionidae. This species is the only species in the genus Bengala. It is found in lakes and rivers in eastern India, Bangladesh and western Myanmar. It reaches a maximum length of 21 centimetres (8.3 in). It is a valued food fish and is a species of commercial importance and the population is believed to be declining due to overfishing and habitat destruction.
