= Catherwood Library =

Cornell University library

Coordinates: 42.447252°N 76.480998°W

The Martin P. Catherwood Library, commonly known as the Catherwood Library or simply the ILR Library, serves the New York State School of Industrial and Labor Relations at Cornell University. One of over a dozen libraries within the Cornell University Library system, the Catherwood Library is considered the most comprehensive resource of its kind in North America. The Catherwood Library's stated mission is to serve as a comprehensive information center in support of the research, instruction, and service commitments of the Industrial and Labor Relations School and Cornell community. The Catherwood Library is an official Depository Library of the International Labour Organization (ILO), one of only two in the country to be so designated; the other is the Library of Congress.

== History ==
By acts of the New York State Legislature in 1944, Cornell was authorized to establish the New York State School of Industrial and Labor Relations. The Temporary Board of Trustees mandated that the School should render three types of service, one being the provision of information "... both in response to specific inquiries from interested individuals and groups and through publications which it may initiate itself." The Board further declared, "It will be essential to develop at the earliest possible moment a comprehensive library, both of standard works and periodicals and of documentary materials."

To fulfill this mandate, Dean Irving Ives delegated the task of creating a library for the new school to J. Gormly Miller, shortly after the latter's return from the armed services. The library was established in November 1946, with its various departments spread across campus: the first reading room was housed in Warren Hall, while a sizable number of the librarians were stationed in Myron Taylor Hall. By early 1948, fewer than half of the library's 10,000-volume collection could be fit in the space available.

Construction of a dedicated library building began in September 1959 on the site that previously housed a portion of Cornell's School of Veterinary Medicine. Part of a complex which also included new classrooms for ILR students, the library opened doors to its new quarters in 1962.

In 1970, the school renamed the library in honor of Martin P. Catherwood, who served as Dean of the ILR school from 1947 to 1958, in recognition of a "lifetime of public service" which also included appointments as state commerce commissioner, the industrial commissioner of New York State, and chair of the New York State Planning Board. Catherwood was also a professor of public administration at Cornell's College of Agriculture. The building was built in 1962 and renovated in 2007 by New York State, which continues to own it.

== Current Operations and Collection ==
The Catherwood Library employs a staff of 23, including nine professional librarians. The collection includes over 250,000 volumes, including over 1,500 journals, newsletters, and annuals. The Kheel Center's archive includes over 400,000 historical photographs and over 20,000 feet (6,100 m) of manuscript materials. The library's $1.8 million annual operating budget is funded 59% from New York State appropriations, and 36% from the ILR School, with the remainder from grants and income.

The library boasts strong holdings in the subject areas of collective bargaining, industrial relations, labor dispute resolution, labor economics and the employment relationship, labor history, contemporary trade union issues, human resource studies, organizational behavior, and international and comparative industrial relations.

== Kheel Center ==
The Kheel Center for Labor-Management Documentation & Archives was founded in 1949 as the Labor-Management Documentation Center. Its continuing purpose is the preservation of original source materials relevant to the history of American labor unions, management theory as it applies to labor and industrial relations, and the history of employees at the workplace.

With over 20,000 feet (6,100 m) of manuscript materials, the Kheel Center ranks as one of three major centers of its type in the country. It also houses an exceptional photograph collection of over 400,000 images, 350 oral history interviews, over 40,000 collective bargaining agreements, over 250,000 pamphlets and union constitutions, and other labor related material. The center is the designated repository for papers of key individuals and organizations prominent in the history of labor-management relations.

In May 1996, the center was renamed to honor Theodore W. Kheel, distinguished lawyer, arbitrator, mediator, and public figure and his wife, Ann Sunstein Kheel. Throughout its history, the Kheel Center has been a unit of the Catherwood Library of the School of Industrial and Labor Relations.

One of the most celebrated aspects of the Kheel Center's collection is the Triangle Fire Exhibit, detailing the Triangle Shirtwaist Factory Fire of 1911.

== DigitalCollections@ILR ==
Offered as a service of the Catherwood Library, DigitalCollections@ILR is a digital repository project that offers electronic access to unique material that encompasses every aspect of the workplace. Research and scholarly output included within the DigitalCollections@ILR has been selected and deposited by the Catherwood Library in conjunction with individual departments, centers, institutes, and programs within the School of Industrial and Labor Relations.

This repository was known as DigitalCommons@ILR until 2020.
