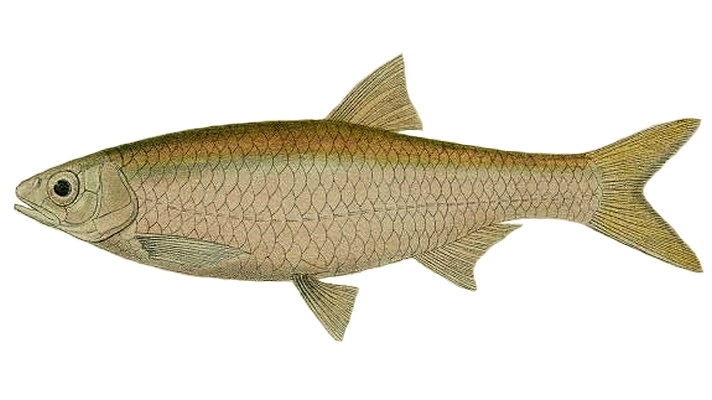
- Nile minnow, (Leptocypris niloticus)

Scientific classification
- Kingdom: Animalia
- Phylum: Chordata
- Class: Actinopterygii
- Order: Cypriniformes
- Family: Danionidae
- Subfamily: Chedrinae
- Genus: Leptocypris; Boulenger, 1900

Type species
- Leptocypris modestus Boulenger, 1900

= Leptocypris =

Genus of fishes

Leptocypris is a genus of freshwater ray-finned fishes belonging to the family Danionidae, the danios or danionins. The fishes in this genus are found in Africa

== Species ==
Leptocypris contains the following species:

- Leptocypris crossensis Howes & Teugels, 1989
- Leptocypris guineensis (Daget, 1962)
- Leptocypris konkoureensis Howes & Teugels, 1989
- Leptocypris lujae (Boulenger, 1909)
- Leptocypris modestus Boulenger, 1900
- Leptocypris niloticus (Joannis, 1835) (Nile minnow)
- Leptocypris taiaensis Howes & Teugels, 1989
- Leptocypris weeksii (Boulenger, 1899)
- Leptocypris weynsii (Boulenger, 1899)
