= Gamia abri =

Scientific classification
- Kingdom: Animalia
- Phylum: Arthropoda
- Class: Insecta
- Order: Lepidoptera
- Family: Hesperiidae
- Genus: Gamia
- Species: G. abri

Binomial name
- Gamia abri Miller & Collins, 1997

Species of butterfly

Gamia abri is a species of butterfly in the family Hesperiidae. It is found in the Central African Republic.

Adults have been recorded on wing in June, July, August and September.
