= Bathanalia =

Scientific classification
- Domain: Eukaryota
- Kingdom: Animalia
- Phylum: Mollusca
- Class: Gastropoda
- Subclass: Caenogastropoda
- Family: Paludomidae
- Genus: Bathanalia; Moore, 1898

Diversity
- 2 species

Genus of gastropods

Bathanalia is a genus of tropical freshwater snails with an operculum, aquatic gastropod mollusks in the family Paludomidae.

This genus is endemic to the Lake Tanganyika.

== Species ==
Species within the genus Bathanalia include:

- Bathanalia howesi (Moore, 1898) - type species
- Bathanalia straeleni Leloup, 1953
