= John Bretland Farmer =

British botanist (1865–1944)

Sir John Farmer FRS
- Education: University of Oxford
- Spouse: Edith May Gertrude Pritchard
- Awards: FRSE; FRS; Knighthood
- Scientific career
- Fields: botanist; cytologist

Sir John Bretland Farmer FRS FRSE (5 April 1865 – 26 January 1944) was a British botanist. He believed that chromomeres not chromosomes were the unit of heredity. Farmer and J. E. S. Moore introduced the term meiosis in 1905.

== Life ==
John Bretland Farmer was born at Atherstone in Warwickshire, the son of John Henry Farmer and his wife Elizabeth Corbett Bretland. He attended the Queen Elizabeth Grammar School in Atherstone.

He won a place at Magdalen College, Oxford, graduating MA in 1887. During this period he was greatly influenced by Isaac Bayley Balfour. He was made a Fellow of Magdalen College 1889–1897, demonstrator of botany in 1887–1892, and assistant professor of biology in 1892–1895 at Oxford, and then became professor of botany at Imperial College London. He received the Doctor of Science (D.Sc.) from the University of Oxford in March 1902. He was appointed Governor of The John Roan School and member of the council of Hartley University College by the Senate of the University of London in January 1903.

In 1892, he married Edith May Gertrude Pritchard, the daughter of Charles Pritchard, Savilian professor of astronomy at the University of Oxford. They had a daughter.

He was elected a Fellow of the Royal Society in 1900, was awarded its Royal Medal in 1919 and was its vice-president from 1919 to 1921. He was also President of the Alpine Climbers Club 1910–12. He was knighted in 1926 for services to botany and scientific education.

He died in Exmouth on the southern English coast on 26 January 1944.

== Research and publications ==
Farmer published particularly on cytology, with his earliest paper on the topic appearing in 1893. He coined the term "meiosis" in a 1904 paper with J. E. S. Moore. His other collaborators included C. E. Walker. In addition to his botanical work, he published several papers on cytology in human cells, especially malignant cancer cells. With Lettice Digby, he published a study of the dimensions of chromosomes in 1914.

His other botanical research interests included liverworts. He also published on water movement in trees, measuring the rate of conduction and showing that this was lower in evergreens than in deciduous trees.

Farmer was an editor of the Annals of Botany (1906–1922). He was also editor of the John Murray–published journal, Science Progress in the Twentieth Century (1909–1912), and Gardeners' Chronicle (1904–1906). His books include:

- Flowering Plants (1899)
- Elementary Botany (1904)
- The Book of Nature Study (6 vols) (1908 onwards)
- Translation of Die Mutationstheorie (1911) co-written with Arthur Dukinfield Darbishire
- Plant Life (1913)
- Nature and Development of Plants (1918)
