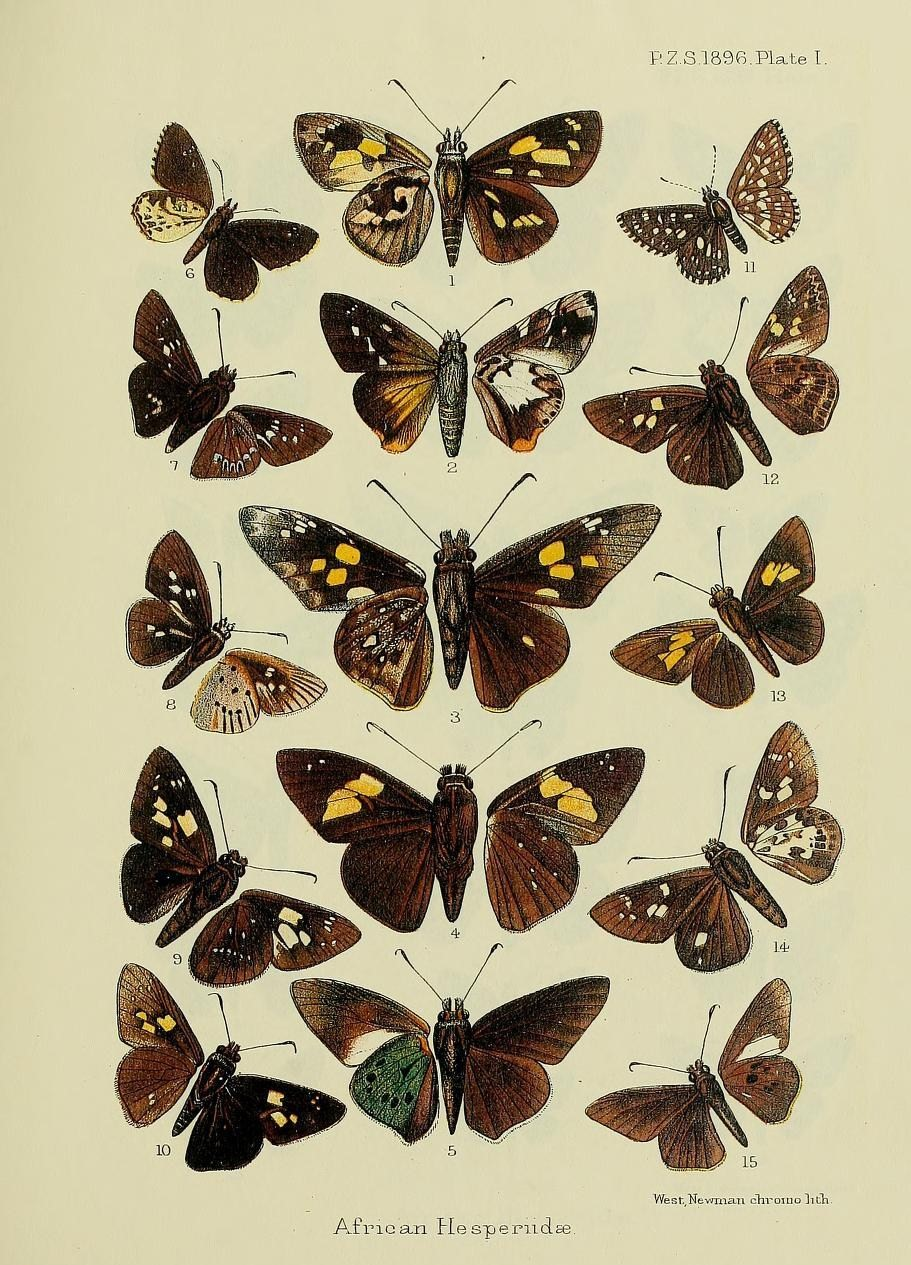
- Figure 1

Scientific classification
- Kingdom: Animalia
- Phylum: Arthropoda
- Class: Insecta
- Order: Lepidoptera
- Family: Hesperiidae
- Genus: Gamia
- Species: G. shelleyi

Binomial name
- Gamia shelleyi (Sharpe, 1890)

Synonyms
- List: Proteides shelleyi Sharpe, 1890; Proteides galua Holland, 1891; Hesperia zintgraffi Karsch, 1892

= Gamia shelleyi =

Species of butterfly

Gamia shelleyi, commonly known as the lesser grand skipper, is a species of butterfly in the family Hesperiidae. It is found in Guinea, Ivory Coast, Ghana, Nigeria, Cameroon, Gabon, the Republic of the Congo, the Central African Republic, the Democratic Republic of the Congo, Uganda, western Kenya, Tanzania and Zambia. The habitat consists of forests.

The larvae feed on Borassus, Phoenix, Raphia and Dracena species.
