= Malayochela =

Conservation status
- Least Concern (IUCN 3.1)

Scientific classification
- Kingdom: Animalia
- Phylum: Chordata
- Class: Actinopterygii
- Order: Cypriniformes
- Family: Danionidae
- Subfamily: Chedrinae
- Genus: Malayochela; Bănărescu (ro), 1968
- Species: M. maassi

Binomial name
- Malayochela maassi (M. C. W. Weber & de Beaufort, 1912)

Synonyms
- Chela maassi (Weber & de Beaufort, 1912); Eustira maassi Weber & de Beaufort, 1912

Species of fish

Malayochela is a monospecific genus of freshwater ray-finned fish belonging to the family Danionidae, the danios or danionins. The only species in the genus is Malayochela maassi, a fish found in Peninsular Malaysia, Sumatra and Kalimantan

== Etymology ==
The fish is named in honor of German anthropologist Alfred Maass (1889–1936), who led an expedition to Sumatra, during which the holotype specimen was collected.
