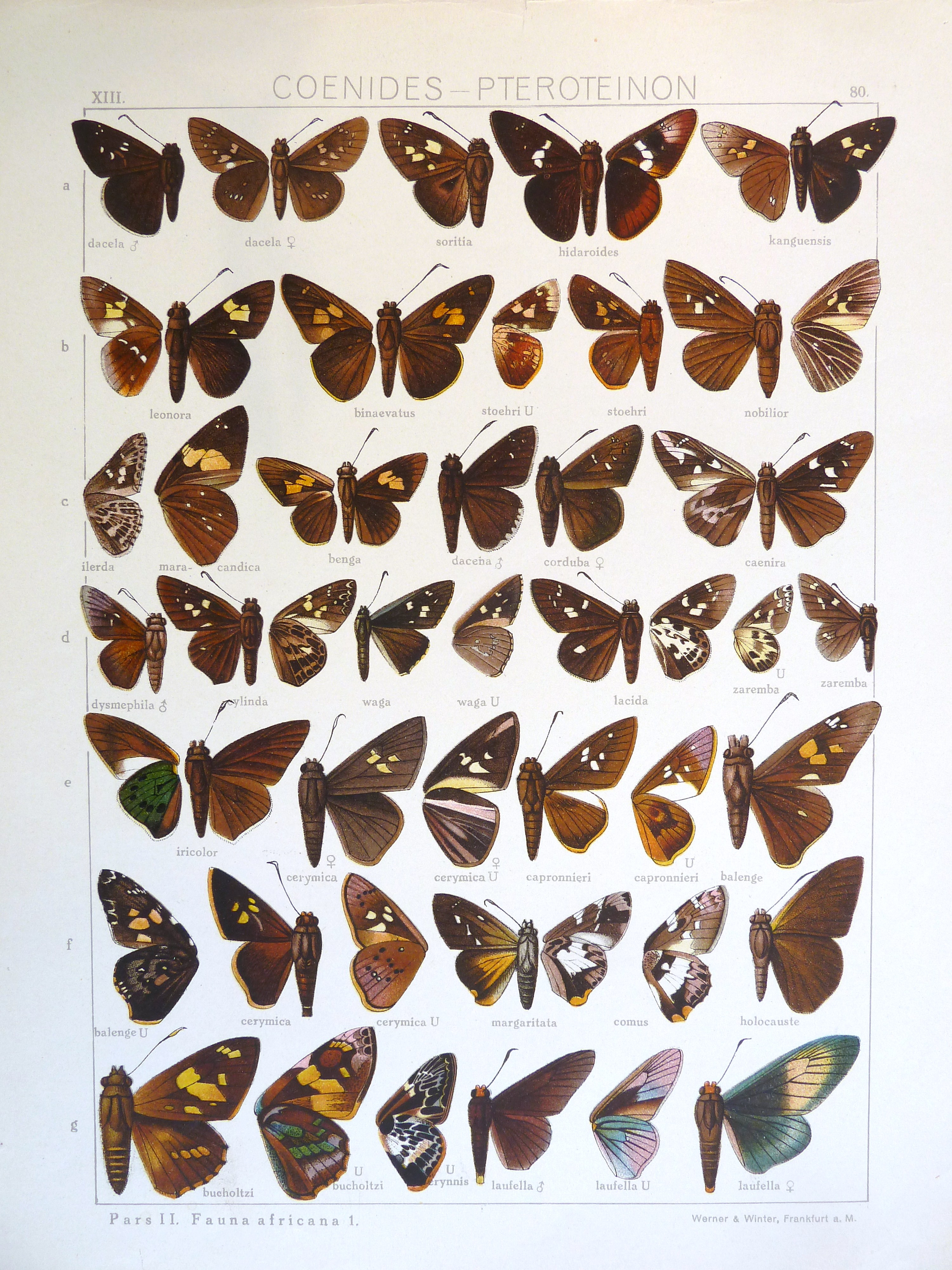

Scientific classification
- Kingdom: Animalia
- Phylum: Arthropoda
- Clade: Pancrustacea
- Class: Insecta
- Order: Lepidoptera
- Family: Hesperiidae
- Genus: Gamia
- Species: G. buchholzi

Binomial name
- Gamia buchholzi (Plötz, 1879)

Synonyms
- List: Hesperia buchholzi Plötz, 1879; Proteides ditissimus Mabille, 1891; Gangara basistriga Holland, 1893; Gamia robustus Mabille; Holland, 1896

= Gamia buchholzi =

Species of butterfly

Gamia buchholzi, commonly known as the grand skipper, is a species of butterfly in the family Hesperiidae. It is found in Sierra Leone, Ivory Coast, Ghana, Nigeria, Cameroon, Gabon, the Republic of the Congo, the Central African Republic, the Democratic Republic of the Congo, Uganda, western Kenya and north-western Tanzania. The habitat consists of forests.

Adults are attracted to flowers.

The larvae feed on Borassus aethiopum, Phoenix reclinata, Raphia monbuttorum, Raphia farinifera and Dracaena species (including Dracaena arborea).

Torben Larsen developed a species numbering system for his 2005 publication Butterflies of West Africa. This species is #1377. The 'Larsen' numbers have since been used with permission in A Sharp Eye on Butterflies of Ghana.

== Etymology ==
The name honours Reinhold Wilhelm Buchholz who collected the specimens first described by Plötz.
