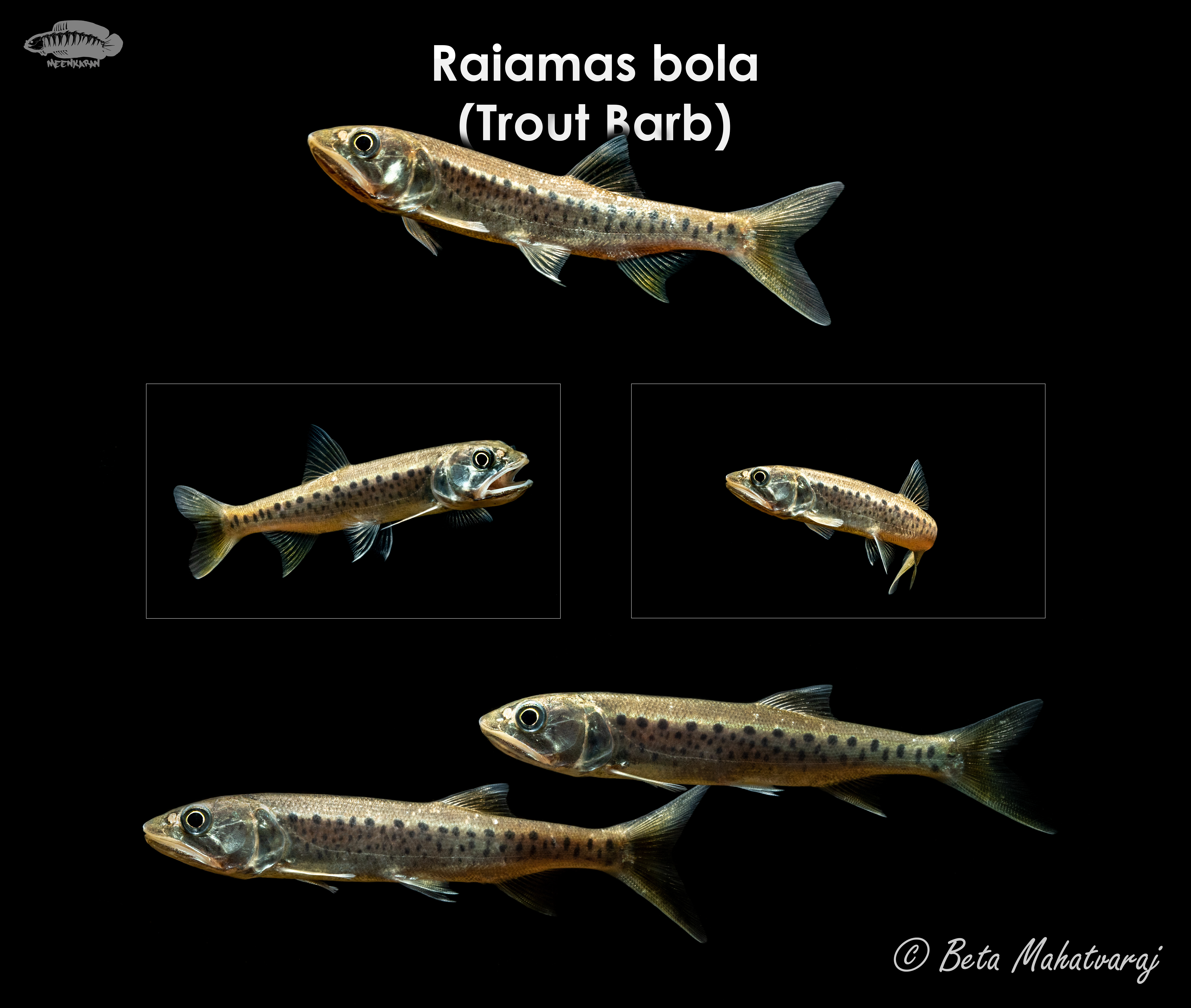
- Trout barb (Raiamas bola)

Scientific classification
- Kingdom: Animalia
- Phylum: Chordata
- Class: Actinopterygii
- Order: Cypriniformes
- Family: Danionidae
- Subfamily: Chedrinae
- Genus: Raiamas; D. S. Jordan, 1919

Type species
- Cyprinus bola F. Hamilton, 1822

Species
- 17, see text.

Synonyms
- Bola Günther, 1868

= Raiamas =

Genus of fishes

Raiamas is a genus of freshwater ray-finned fishes belonging to the family Danionidae, the danios or danionins. The majority of the species are from Africa, but R. bola and R. guttatus are from South and Southeast Asia.

== Species ==
Raiamas contains the following species:

- Raiamas ansorgii (Boulenger, 1910)
- Raiamas batesii (Boulenger, 1914)
- Raiamas bola (Hamilton, 1822) (Trout barb)
- Raiamas brachyrhabdotos Manda, Snoeks, Manda & Vreven, 2018
- Raiamas buchholzi (Peters, 1876)
- Raiamas christyi (Boulenger, 1920) (Coppernose barb)
- Raiamas guttatus (Day, 1870) (Burmese trout)
- Raiamas intermedius (Boulenger, 1915)
- Raiamas kheeli Stiassny, Schelly & Schliewen, 2006
- Raiamas levequei Howes & Teugels, 1989
- Raiamas longirostris (Boulenger, 1902)
- Raiamas marqueti Manda, Snoeks, Manda & Vreven, 2018
- Raiamas moorii (Boulenger, 1900) (Lake Rukwa minnow)
- Raiamas nigeriensis (Daget, 1959) (Aeroplane fish)
- Raiamas salmolucius (Nichols & Griscom, 1917)
- Raiamas scarciensis Howes & Teugels, 1989
- Raiamas senegalensis (Steindachner, 1870) (Silverfish)
- Raiamas steindachneri (Pellegrin, 1908)
