= John Edmund Sharrock Moore =

English biologist (1870–1947)

- Born: John Edmund Shorec Moore; 10 May 1870
- Died: 15 January 1947 (aged 76); Cornwall
- Known for: Introduced the terms synapsis and meiosis
- Spouse: Heloise Salvin
- Children: 1
- Scientific career
- Fields: Cytology; Zoology
- Workplaces: Royal College of Science; University of Liverpool
- Author abbrev. (zoology): Moore

John Edmund Sharrock Moore ARCS (10 May 1870 – 15 January 1947) was an English biologist, best known for being co-publisher of the term meiosis and leading two expeditions to Tanganyika.

== Personal life ==
Born at Swinshaw near Loveclough, Rossendale, Lancashire, he was the son of Henry (1821–1907) and Mary Elizabeth Moore (née Margerison, 1832–1878). Henry's father, John (1794–1869) was a cotton manufacturer and the first Mayor of Burnley (elected 1862). Following the Cotton Famine Spencer and Moore went bankrupt in 1872. Henry Moore became a colliery agent, moving the family to Southampton and later to Chiswick (before 1891). His father became a sculptor, as did his sister Esther Mary Moore who exhibited at the Royal Academy of Arts.

Moore studied at Tonbridge School, Kent for a year and then the Royal College of Science in South Kensington.

In 1904 he married Heloise Salvin, second daughter of the naturalist Osbert Salvin. Moore frequently used the name Salvin-Moore after his marriage. They had one child, Osbert John Salvin Moore (1905–1960) who is better known by his monastic name, Ñāṇamoli Bhikkhu, a British Theravada Buddhist monk and translator of Pali literature.

Moore retired in 1908 after the death of his father. In 1911 he was living with his wife and son in Chiswick along with four of his sisters. During the 1920s he moved to Tresco, Isles of Scilly where his wife died on 4 November 1927. He lived there at least between 1929 and 1941. After a long retirement he died of heart failure and arteriosclerosis in West Cornwall Hospital, Penzance on 15 January 1947.

Although he is often cited as John Edward Sharrock Moore, he used several versions of his name. For example, he is listed as John Edmund Shorrock Moore-Salvin in Who Was Who, a name he adopted after the death of his wife.

== Scientific career ==
In 1892 he created the biological term ‘synapsis’. Later in 1905 he would co-publisher the term ‘meiosis’ in collaboration with John Bretland Farmer. His scientific interests lay in the new and rapidly developing field of cytology. Between 1892 and 1905 he worked in the Huxley Laboratory at the Royal College of Science on several projects within this field. He was supervised and generally mentored by George Bond Howes. He frequently worked alone, but collaborated with Farmer on meiosis and with both Farmer and Charles Edward Walker on cancer cytology.

During this time he made three extended visits overseas to further his research. The first was between 16 October 1893 and 9 June 1894 to the Marine Biological Station in Naples, using facilities hired by the British Association and in part supported by a Marshall scholarship.

The other two were when he led the First and Second Tanganyika Expeditions (1895–1897 and 1899–1900). The objective was to survey the fauna of lakes, especially Lake Tanganyika and he recorded the outcome of the two expeditions in many publications. During the second expedition he was the first to reach the snowline of the Rwenzori Mountains, 'the Snows of the Mountains of the Moon', attaining 14,900 feet and proved the existence of permanent glaciers.

In 1900 he was appointed as a Demonstrator in Zoology at the Royal College of Science. He became an acting Professor of Zoology there from 1903 to 1905 while Howe was in poor health. In 1906 he was appointed the Professor of Experimental and Pathological Cytology and Director of the Cancer Research Laboratories at the University of Liverpool, retiring in 1908. Walker moved with him to Liverpool as assistant director. The Mrs Sutton Timmis Memorial Fund initially supported their work on cancer. In 1908 Moore ceased all scientific activity.

== Awards and memberships ==
He was the first to be awarded the Huxley Gold Medal for Research, in 1900 by Royal College of Science. He was a Fellow of the Royal Geographic Society from 1901, the Linnean Society (1903–1909) and the Zoological Society of London. He was a member of the Alpine Club, and became a member of the Authors' Club from 1944.

== Publications ==
He was the author or co-author of 71 communications and publications including:

- Moore, J.E.S., 1897a. The physiographical features of the Nyasa and Tanganyika districts of central Africa. Geogr. J. 10: 289–300.
- Moore, J.E.S., 1897b. The freshwater fauna of Lake Tanganyika. Nature, Lond. 56: 198–200.
- Moore, J.E.S., 1897c. On the general zoological results of the Tanganyika expedition. Proc. zool. Soc., 1897: 436–439.
- Moore, J.E.S., 1897d. The fauna of the great African lakes. Sc. Progr. 4: 627–641.
- Moore, J.E.S., 1898a. The marine fauna in Lake Tanganyika and the desirability of further exploration in the great African lakes. Nature, Lond. 58: 404–408.
- Moore, J.E.S., 1898b (March). On the zoological evidence for the connection of Lake Tanganyika with the sea. Proc. R. Soc. 62: 451–458.
- Moore, J.E.S., 1898c (March). The molluscs of the great African lakes. I. Distribution. Q. Jl. microsc. Sci. (n.s.) 41: 159–180.
- Moore, J.E.S., 1898d (March). The molluscs of the great African lakes. II. The anatomy of the Typhobyas with a description of the new genus (Batanalia) (sic) Q. Jl. microsc. Sci. (n.s.) 41: 181–204, plates 11–14.
- Moore, J.E.S., 1898e (July). Descriptions of the genera Bathanalia and Bythoceras, from Lake Tanganyika. Proc. malac. Soc. Lond. 3: 108–109.
- Moore, J.E.S., 1898f. Discussion on the Mollusca of Lake Tanganyika, with special reference to their affinities Proc. malac. Soc. Lond. 3: 108–109.
- Moore, J.E.S., 1898g. On the hypothesis that Lake Tanganyika represents an old Jurassic sea. Q. Jl. microsc. Sci. (n.s.) 41: 303–321, plate 23.
- Moore, J.E.S., 1898h. Appendix to G.A. Boulenger, Report on the collection of fishes made by Mr. J.E.S. Moore in Lake Tanganyika during his expedition 1895–96. Trans. zool. Soc. Lond. 15: 26–29.
- Moore, J.E.S., 1899a. The molluscs of the great African lakes. III. Tanganyikia rufofilosa, and the genus Spekia. Q. Jl. microsc. Sci. (n.s.) 42: 155–185, plates 14–19.
- Moore, J.E.S., 1899b. The molluscs of the great African lakes. IV. Nassopsis, and Bythoceras. Q. Jl. microsc. Sci. (n.s.) 42: 187–201, plates 20, 21.
- Moore, J.E.S., 1899c. On the divergent forms at present incorporated in the family Melaniidae. Proc. malac. Soc. Lond. 32: 230–234.
- Moore, J.E.S., 1899d. Exhibition of, and remarks upon, some specimens of the jellyfish (Limnocnida tanganjicae) of Lake Tanganyika. Proc. zool. Soc. Lond. 1899: 291–292.
- Moore, J.E.S., 1900. On the character and origin of the ‘parklands’ in central Africa. Linnean Society of London, November 1. Nature Lond. 63: 98; also J. Bot., Lond. 38: 499–500. Published as chapter 23 (pp. 316–327) of To the Mountains of the Moon, 1901.
- Moore, J.E.S., 1901a. Tanganyika and the countries north of it. Geogr. J. 17: 1–33.
- Moore, J.E.S., 1901b. Further researches concerning the molluscs of the great African lakes. Proc. zool. Soc. Lond. 1901(2): 461–470, 2 plates.
- Moore, J.E.S., 1901c. To the Mountains of the Moon; being an account of the modern aspect of central Africa, and of some little known regions transversed by the Tanganyika Expedition in 1899 and 1900.. London, pp. 350.
- Moore, J.E.S., 1901d. Exhibition of a specimen and microscopic preparation of a new polyzoon encrusting the shell of Paramelania.. Proc. Linn. Soc. Lond. 1901–19025
- Moore, J.E.S., 1902. First ascent of one of the snow ridges in the Mountains of the Moon. Alpine J. 21: 77–90.
- J. B. Farmer, J. E. S. Moore and Digby L., 1902 On the cytology of apogamy and apospory - 1 preliminary note on apogamy Proceedings of the Royal Society of London 71: 475 453-457
- Moore, J.E.S., 1903a. The Tanganyika problem. Geogr. J. 21: 682–685.
- Moore, J.E.S., 1903b. The Tanganyika problem; an account of the researches undertaken concerning the existence of marine animals in central Africa. London, pp. 371.
- Moore, J.E.S., 1906. Halolimnic faunas and the Tanganyika problem. Rep. Br. Ass. Advmt. Sci. 1906: 601–602.
- Moore, J.E.S. and Randles, W.B., 1902. A new interpretation of the gastric organs of Spirula, Nautilus, and the gastropods. Proc. R. Soc. 70: 231–237.
- Preston, H.B., 1910. Additions to the non-marine molluscan fauna of British and German East Africa and Lake Albert Edward.Ann. Mag. nat. Hist. ser. 8, 6: 526–536. [Addendum: see Conchol. Newsl. 162: 237]
- Moore, J.E.S., 1935 Five Foolish Virgins

== Taxon named in his honor ==
- The Lake Rukwa minnow Raiamas moorii is a species of ray-finned fish in the family Cyprinidae. It is found in Lake Tanganyika, Lake Kivu and Lake Rukwa in Tanzania, the Democratic Republic of the Congo, Rwanda, Tanzania and Zambia.
