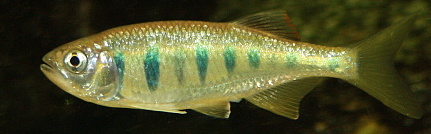
- Opsarius pulchellus

Scientific classification
- Kingdom: Animalia
- Phylum: Chordata
- Class: Actinopterygii
- Order: Cypriniformes
- Family: Danionidae
- Subfamily: Chedrinae; Bleeker, 1863

= Chedrinae =

Chedrinae Temporal range: Middle Miocene–present

Subfamily of fishes

Chedrinae, the troutbarbs, is a subfamily of freshwater ray-finned fishes belonging to the family Danionidae, the danionins or danios. The fishes in this subfamily are found in Asia and Africa.

== Genera ==
Chedrinae contains the following genera:

- Barilius Hamilton, 1822
- Bengala Gray, 1834
- Cabdio Hamilton, 1822
- Chelaethiops Boulenger, 1899
- Engraulicypris Günther, 1894
- Leptocypris Boulenger, 1900
- Luciosoma Bleeker, 1855
- Malayochela Bănărescu, 1968
- Nematabramis Boulenger, 1894
- Neobola Vinciguerra, 1895
- Opsaridium Peters, 1854
- Opsarius McClelland, 1838
- Raiamas D. S. Jordan, 1919
- Rastrineobola Fowler, 1936
- Salmostoma Swainson, 1839
- Securicula Günther, 1868
- Thryssocypris Roberts & Kottelat, 1984

The following fossil genus is also known:

- †Proluciosoma Roberts & Jumnongthai, 1999 (mid-late Miocene of Thailand)
